= List of contributors to Rees's Cyclopædia =

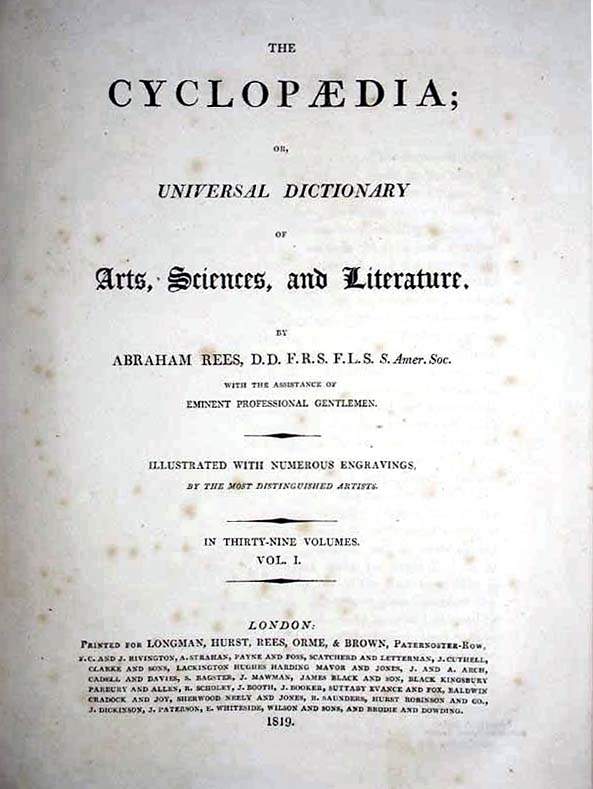
1819 title page from the Cyclopædia

There were about 100 contributors to Rees's Cyclopædia, most of whom were Nonconformists. They were specialists in their fields, covering science, technology, medicine, manufacturing, agriculture, banking and transportation, as well as the arts and humanities. A number were members of the teaching staffs of the Royal Military Academy, and the Addiscombe Military Seminary of the East India Company. Other contributors were working journalists who wrote for scientific, medical and technical periodicals of the time. Several of the contributors were active in radical politics; one was gaoled for sedition and another indicted for treason.

Amongst the eminent writers engaged by Rees were Dr Charles Burney (1726–1814) who wrote on music and musical biography; Dr Lant Carpenter (1780–1870) on education, mental and moral philosophy; Tiberius Cavallo (1799–1809) on electricity and magnetism; John Farey, sr. (1766–1826), on canals, geology, music and surveying; John Farey, jr. (1791–1851) on machinery, manufactures, steam engine, and water. He also contributed a great number of the illustrations; John Flaxman (1755–1826) on sculpture; Luke Howard (1772–1867) on meteorology; John Landseer (1769–1852) on engraving; Sir William Lawrence, (1783–1867) on human and comparative anatomy; Sir James Edward Smith (1759–1828) on botany; David Mushet on metallurgy and chemistry; Rev. William Pearson (1767–1847) on astronomy; Sir Thomas Phillips (1770–1875) on painting.

Among the artists and engravers employed were Aaron Arrowsmith (1750–1823) who engraved the maps; William Blake (1757–1827) who made engravings to illustrate some of the sculpture articles; Thomas Milton (1743–1827) who engraved most of the natural history plates; Wilson Lowry (1762–1824) who engraved numerous of the plates especially those relating to architecture, machinery and scientific instruments.

With the exception of the botanical articles by Sir James Edward Smith, none of the articles are signed. Names were recorded in the Prospectus of 1802, the introduction at the start of the first volume, the paper covers of the unbound parts which have survived, and in a paper in the Philosophical Magazine, published in 1820. The following alphabetical list has been compiled from the foregoing sources. The majority appear in the Dictionary of National Biography, and in sources listed in the British Biographical Index, but these accounts rarely record an involvement with the Cyclopædia.

== List of contributors ==
Name	Topics
John Abernethy (1764–1831)	Anatomy, Physiology
Arthur Aikin (1773–1854)	Chemistry, Geology, Mineralogy
Charles Rochmont Aikin (1775–1847)	Topics not Stated
Edmund Aikin (1780–1820)	Architecture
William Anderson (1757–1837)	Made drawings (perhaps of marine topics)
Aaron Arrowsmith (1750–1823)	Directed Maps
John Bacon (1777–1859)	Sculpture
Robert Bakewell (1768–1843)	Geology, Mineralogy, Rock, Strata, Wool, Worsted
Peter Barlow (1776–1862)	Algebra, Analysis, Geometry, Strength of Materials
Thomas Bateman (1778–1821)	Medicine
Delabere Pritchett Blaine (1768–1845)	Veterinary art; Sporting life
William Blair (1766–1822)	Cipher, Stenography, Surgery
Robert Bland (1730–1816)	Midwifery
John Bonnycastle (1780?–1821)	Algebra, Analysis, Astronomy
Thomas Bradley (1751–1813)	Medicine (Not listed in Phil. Mag. but on Prospectus)
William Thomas Brande (1788–1866)	Chemistry
John Britton (1771–1857)	Topography
Charles Burney (1726–1814)	Musical biography, Music
Lant Carpenter (1780–1840)	Education, Language, Mental & Moral Philosophy
Tiberius Cavallo (1749–1809)	Electricity, Machinery, Mechanics
Bracy Clark (1771–1860)	Comparative Anatomy (Not listed in Phil. Mag. but on a cover)
Thomas Clarkson (1760–1846)	Various articles (?Slavery etc)
John Clennell (1772–1822)	Topics not stated
Edward Coleman(1766–1839)	Topics not stated (?Farriery)
Sir Astley Cooper (1768–1871)	Topics not stated (?Medicine/Surgery)
Samuel Cooper (1780–1848)	Surgery
William Crowe (1745–1829)	Topics not stated (?Poetry)
John Cuthbertson (1743–1816)	Electricity?
John Dalton (1766–1844)	Chemistry, Meteorology
Thomas Daniell (1749–1840)	Made drawings
William Daniell (1769–1837)	Made drawings
Humphry Davy (1778–1829)	Chemistry
John Davy (1790–1868)	Chemistry
Richard Watson Dickson (1759–1824)	Agriculture, Meteorology
Edward Donovan (1768–1837)	Conchology, Entomology etc Made drawings and arranged natural history plates
John Duncan fl. 1800	Manufactures, Weaving
Sydenham Edwards (1769?–1819)	Made Natural History drawings
Henry Ellis (1777–1869)	Antiquities and various articles
John Farey, sr. (1766–1826)	Canals, Geology, Measures, Music, Trig. Survey
John Farey, jr. (1791–1851)	Machinery, Manufactures, Mechanics Mill, Steam Engine, Water etc. Made numerous mechanical drawings.
Joseph Farey (1796–1829)	Made many mechanical and miscellaneous drawings
John Flaxman (1855–1826)	Sculpture
John Fletcher Not identified	Chemistry
Henry Fuseli (1741–1825)	(Painting/Art?) In American prospectus only
James Glenie (1750–1817)	Artillery carriages, Cannon, Fortification
George Glover (fl 1800)	Naval Architecture. The writer is probably pseudonymous.
Agnes C. Hall (1777–1846)	French School of Engraving
John Haslam (1764–1844)	Mental derangement
Alexander Henderson (1780–1863)	Medicine
Thomas Dix Hincks (1767–1857)	Geography
Prince Hoare (1755–1834)	Sculpture
Henry Howard (1769–1847)	Drawing, and various articles
Luke Howard (1772–1864)	Meteorology
James Ivory (1765–1842)	Conic Sections, Curves, Geometry
John Jones (1766? – 1827)	Grammar, Language
Jeremiah Joyce (1763–1816)	Various articles
Patrick Kelly (1756–1842)	Coinage, Exchanges, Standard, Weight
Kirkman (Dates not known)	Made drawings
Charles Konig (1774–1851)	Gem, Gem engraving, Geognosy, Mineralogy
John Landseer (1769–1852)	Schools of engraving
William Lawrence (1783–1867)	Anatomy, Human and Comparative Physiology
John Leslie (1766–1832)	(? Mathematics)
Wilson Lowry (1762–1824)	Made drawings for some and engraved very numerous plates.
James Macartney (1770–1843)	Comparative Anatomy, Physiology
Andrew Mackay (1760–1809)	Navigation
Benjamin Heath Malkin (1769–1842)	Biographies
Alexander Marcet (1770–1822)	Chemistry
John Milner (1752–1826)	Gothic Architecture
Thomas Milton (1743–1827)	Engraved Natural History Plates
Edward Moor (1771–1848)	Indian Mythology
William Morgan (1750–1833)	Annuities, Insurance
David Mushet (1772–1847)	Blast and Blowing Furnaces, Iron manufacture
George Nayler (1764?–1831)	Heraldry
Peter Nicholson (1765–1844)	Architecture, Carpentry, Joinery, Panorama, Perspective, Projection, Proportional Compasses, Shadows, Stereography, Stereometry.
John Opie (1761–1807)	Painting
William Young Ottley (1771–1836)	Painting
H. Parker	Prosody, Versification
Samuel Parkes (1761–1825)	Manufactures
Richard Pearson (1756–1836)	Topics not stated (?Medicine)
William Pearson (1767–1847)	Astronomical, Chronometrical, Optical etc. Instruments, Horology, Planetary Machines, Watch etc
Thomas Phillips (1770–1845)	Painting
John Pond (1767–1836)	Algebra, Analysis, Astronomy, Degree, Diophantine, Force etc
William Porden (1755–1822)	Architecture
William Owen Pughe (1759–1835)	English History
Abraham Rees (1743–1825)	Gen. Editor; Atmosphere, Hydrostatics and various articles
Thomas Rees (1777–1864)	Biography, various articles, examined and described the plates
Peter Mark Roget	Sweating sickness, symptom, synocha, synochus, tabes, tetanus.
John Russell (1745–1806)	Painting
George Sanderson	Arch
John Scott (1774–1827)	Engraved Natural History Plates
James Edward Smith (1759–1828)	Botanical Biography, Botany D to the end
James Sowerby (1757–1822)	Made Natural History drawings
Jonathan Stokes (1755–1831)	Botany [sic] (Printed in the Prospectus in error)
Joseph Strutt (1749–1802)	Antiquities
George Stubbs (1724–1806)	Made Drawings
Charles Sylvester (? – 1828)	Chemistry, Definite Proportions, File Cutting, Galvanism, Pottery, Voltaism etc.
W. Symonds	Topics not stated
Charles Taylor( – 1816)	Bleaching
John Taylor (1779–1863)	Mining
William Thomas (Dates not known)	Topics not stated
James Thomson (1779–1850)	Cotton spinning and manufacture
William Tooke (1744–1820)	Geography (?of Russia)
Sharon Turner (1768–1847)	English History
Edmund Turrell (d. 1835)	Enamelling
Thomas Webster (1773–1844)	Architecture, Aquatinta
William Wood (1745–1808)	Botany B to end of C
William Woodville (1752–1805)	Botany A

== List of contributors by topic ==
The previous list has been sorted into subject areas. It allows contributors of many single articles, usually of monograph length, to be identified. However a number of subjects, such as architecture and chemistry, have multiple contributors, so individual attributions are not possible.

SUBJECT AREA	CONTRIBUTOR
Agriculture	Richard Watson Dickson
Algebra	Peter Barlow, John Bonnycastle, John Pond
Analysis	John Bonnycastle, John Pond
Anatomy	William Lawrence
Annuities	William Morgan
Antiquities	Henry Ellis, Joseph Strutt
Aquatinta	Thomas Webster
Arch	George Sanderson
Architecture	Edmund Aikin, Peter Nicholson, William Porden, Thomas Webster
Artillery carriages	James Glenie
Astronomy	John Bonnycastle, John Pond
Astronomical instruments	William Pearson
Atmosphere	Abraham Rees
Biographies	Benjamin Heath Malkin, Thomas Rees
Botanical Biography	James Edward Smith
Musical Biography	Charles Burney
Blast Furnaces	David Mushet
Bleaching	Charles Taylor
Blowing Furnaces	David Mushet
Botany	James Edward Smith, William Wood, William Woodville
Canals	John Farey, sr
Cannon	James Glenie
Carpentry	Peter Nicholson
Chemistry	Arthur Aikin, William Thomas Brande, John Dalton, Alexander Marcet, Charles Sylvester, Humphry Davy, John Davy, John Fletcher
Chronometrical instruments	William Pearson
Cipher	William Blair
Coinage	Patrick Kelly
Comparative Anatomy	Bracy Clark, James Macartney
Comparative Physiology	William Lawrence
Conchology	Edward Donovan
Conic Section	James Ivory
Cotton spinning	James Thomson
Curves	James Ivory
Definite Proportions	Charles Sylvester
Degree	John Pond
Diophantine	John Pond
Drawing	Henry Howard
Dynamics	Tiberius Cavallo
Education	Lant Carpenter
Electricity	Tiberius Cavallo, John Cuthbertson
Enamelling	Edmund Turrell
English History	William Owen Pughe, Sharon Turner
Entomology	Edward Donovan
Exchanges	Patrick Kelly
File Cutting	Charles Sylvester
Force	John Pond
Fortification	James Glenie
French school of engraving	John Landseer
Galvanism	Charles Sylvester
Gem	Charles Konig
Gem engraving	Charles Konig
Geognosy	Charles Konig
Geography	Thomas Dix Hincks
Geography (?of Russia)	William Tooke
Geology	Arthur Aikin, Robert Bakewell, John Farey, sr
Geometry	Peter Barlow, James Ivory
Gothic Architecture	John Milner
Grammar	John Jones
Heraldry	George Nayler
Horology	William Pearson
Human physiology	William Lawrence
Hydrostatics	Abraham Rees
Indian Mythology	Edward Moor
Iron manufacture	David Mushet
Italian school of engraving	John Landseer
Joinery	Peter Nicholson
Language	Lant Carpenter, John Jones
Machinery	Tiberius Cavallo, John Farey, jr
Manufacture of Cotton	James Thompson
Manufactures	John Duncan, John Farey, jr, Samuel Parkes
Mathematics	John Leslie
Measures	John Farey, sr
Mechanics	Tiberius Cavallo, John Farey, Jr
Medicine	Alexander Henderson
Medicine	Thomas Bateman
Mental & Moral Philosophy	Lant Carpenter
Mental derangement	John Haslam
Meteorology	John Dalton, Richard Watson Dickson, Luke Howard
Midwifery	Robert Bland
Mill	John Farey, jr
Mineralogy	Arthur Aikin, Robert Bakewell, Charles Konig
Mining	John Taylor
Music	Charles Burney, John Farey, sr
Naval Architecture	George Glover
Navigation	Andrew Mackay
Optical Instruments	William Pearson
Other schools of engraving	John Landseer
Painting	John Opie, William Young Ottley, Thomas Phillips, John Russell
Panorama	Peter Nicholson
Perspective	Peter Nicholson
Physiology	John Abernethy, James Macartney
Planetary Machines	William Pearson
Pottery	Charles Sylvester
Projection	Peter Nicholson
Proportional Compasses	Peter Nicholson
Prosody	H. Parker
Rock	Robert Bakewell
Sculpture	John Bacon, John Flaxman, Prince Hoare
Shadows	Peter Nicholson
Standard	Patrick Kelly
Steam Engine	John Farey, jr
Stenography	William Blair
Stereography	Peter Nicholson
Stereometry	Peter Nicholson
Strata	Robert Bakewell
Strength of Materials	Peter Barlow
Surgery	William Blair, Samuel Cooper
Topography	John Britton
Trigonometrical Survey	John Farey, sr
Versification	H. Parker
Voltaism	Charles Sylvester
Watch	William Pearson
Water	John Farey, jr
Weaving	John Duncan
Weight	Patrick Kelly
Wool	Robert Bakewell
Worsted	Robert Bakewell

The following are noted as contributors of unidentified topics: Abraham Rees, Charles Rochmont Aikin, Edward Coleman, Henry Ellis, Henry Howard, Jeremiah Joyce, John Clennel, Sir Astley Cooper, W. Crowe, (?Thomas) Clarkson, Richard Pearson, Thomas Rees, W. Symonds, and William Thomas.

== List of artists ==
Artists not listed as contributors:

Name	Plates
James Brown	Cotton Manufacture IV
Edward Burney	Instruments of Music
J. Burton	Cotton Manufacture II, III, VII
W. Duesbury	Chemistry XVI, XVII
Richard Duppa (1770–1831)	Natural History, V, IV (Mount Vesuvius sketched 1797)
Edward Kennyon [sic Kennion] (1744–1809)	Clouds I, II
John Laporte (1761–1839)	Drawing, Plate 8. Plate 9
I. Glover [some just Glover]	Naval Architecture II, VI, VIII, X, XI, XII, XIII, XIV; Rigging I, II, III, IV; Ships masts VII
L Hebert	Astronomy, I, II; Constellation I, II; Woollen manufacture I [NB W. Hebert, artist, fl at end of C18]
Alex. Macpherson	Geographiæ Antiquæ I, II, IV, V, VI, VII, VIII, IX, X, XI, XII, XIII, XIV, XVII, XVIII, XIX, XX, XXI, XXII
Strange (Dates not known)	Ancient Musical Instruments IV
William Thomson (c1702-1802)	Chemistry XX; Cotton Manufacture I
Cornelius Varley (1781–1873)	Bleaching
Benjamin Lewis Vulliamy (1780–1854)	Horology XLVI
T. Webster	Musical Instruments, XI, XII, XII XII, XIV, XV, [This is not likely to be the Thomas Webster of the previous list]

== List of engravers ==
Engravers not listed as contributors:

Name	Plates
William? Bond ft 1803	Basso Relievo 1, 11
William Blake (1757–1827)	Armour; Basso Releivo IV; Sculpture I, II, III, IV
J. Bye, 34 Duke Street, Smithfield	Spain and Portugal
John Cooke, Camden Town fl 1800	Switzerland, East Germany, West Germany, Cape of Good Hope
Cooper ?Richard;?. Robert	Geographiæ Antiquæ VI, VIII, IX, X, XI, XII, XIII, XIV, XX, XXI; British Isles, Scotland, Ireland, Sweden & Denmark, S. Part of Russia in Europe, The Seven United Provinces, Hungary, Arabia, Persia, China, East India Islands, Pacific Ocean
Robert Hartley Cromeck (1770–1812)	Sculpture I
Alex. Findlay (1790–1870)	Geographim Antique I, III; Canals [etc] of Great Britain
J. Greig	South Italy in Atlas
Hewitt, Queen Street, Bloomsbury	England & Wales
Edward Jones, West Square. fl 1770	France, Asia, United States
Charles Knight (1743–1827?)	Drawing IV
Jel- fecit [= John Landseer who wrote the articles]	Monograms etc of French engravers Monograms etc of German engravers 1, 2, 3 Monograms etc of Low Countries engravers 2 Monograms etc of Italian engravers 1, 2, 3
Jno Lee	Music I, II, III, IV, V, VI, VII, VIII, IX, X, XI, XII, XIII, XIV, XV, XVI, XVII, XVII; XIX, XX, XXI, XXII, XXIII; XXIV, XXV, XXVII, XXVIII; XXIX, XXX, XII, XXXIII; XLV, Plate Euclid, XLVIII; Ancient Musical Instruments III, IV, V; Instruments of Music VI,; Musical Instruments VII, VIII, IX; X, XI, XII, XIII, XIV, XV; Writing by cipher II
Lewis	Architecture XXVI
J Lodge	The world on Mercator's Projection
Henry Noses (1782?–1870)	Composition I, II
James Parker (1750–1805)	Basso Relievo III

== Pseudonymous and unknown contributors ==
Pseudonymous and unknown contributors are very few. Contributor Richard Watson Dickson published a book about gardening in 1807 under the name of Alexander MacDonald. At about this time there seems to have been a genre established of books on practical topics for craftsmen, containing information taken from the various encyclopædias being published then and written by journalists. One such was "Thomas Martin", The Circle of the Mechanical Arts. Another was "John Nicholson", The Operative Mechanic, 1825. Both the writers were described as civil engineers, yet are quite unknown in the profession and published nothing more.

A handful of contributors are just recorded by name, with no indication of what they contributed, nor whom they might be.

George Glover

George Glover (fl. 1804–18), naval architect, was the named author of the naval architecture articles. However, no person of that name has been traced writing anything else or to have a connection with shipbuilding matters. It seems probable that the name is pseudonymous.

The articles are:

- Blocks, vol 4, 1804/5
- Boat, vol 4, 1804/5
- Mast, vol 22, 1812
- Rope and Rope-making, vol 30, 1815
- Rigging, vol 30, 1815
- Sail and Sail-Making, vol 31, 1815
- Ship-Building, vol 32, 1816
- Yards, vol 39, 1818

These articles were reprinted (with the one by John Farey on the manufacture of Ship's Blocks, from Volume 22), by David & Charles in 1972 with the title Rees's Naval Architecture. All the Glover articles have elements from the 1794 edition of Steel's Rigging and Seamanship and the 1818 edition of The Art of Rigging.

John Fletcher

A number of the covers (1805–1809) note he was a lecturer at the Royal Institution; he also wrote about chemistry. So far, no biographical information has been found.

Kirkman

Noted as making drawings, but no candidate has been found.

H. Parker

Noted as writing about prosody and versification, but no candidate has been found.

George Sanderson

Noted as writing the "Arch" article, but no candidate has been found. He was a self-taught mathematician. A portrait had appeared in Philosophical Magazine, vol. 15, with an appeal for a biography to be written.

W. Symonds

No topics or candidate have been found.
