= Maund (unit) =

Traditional unit of mass

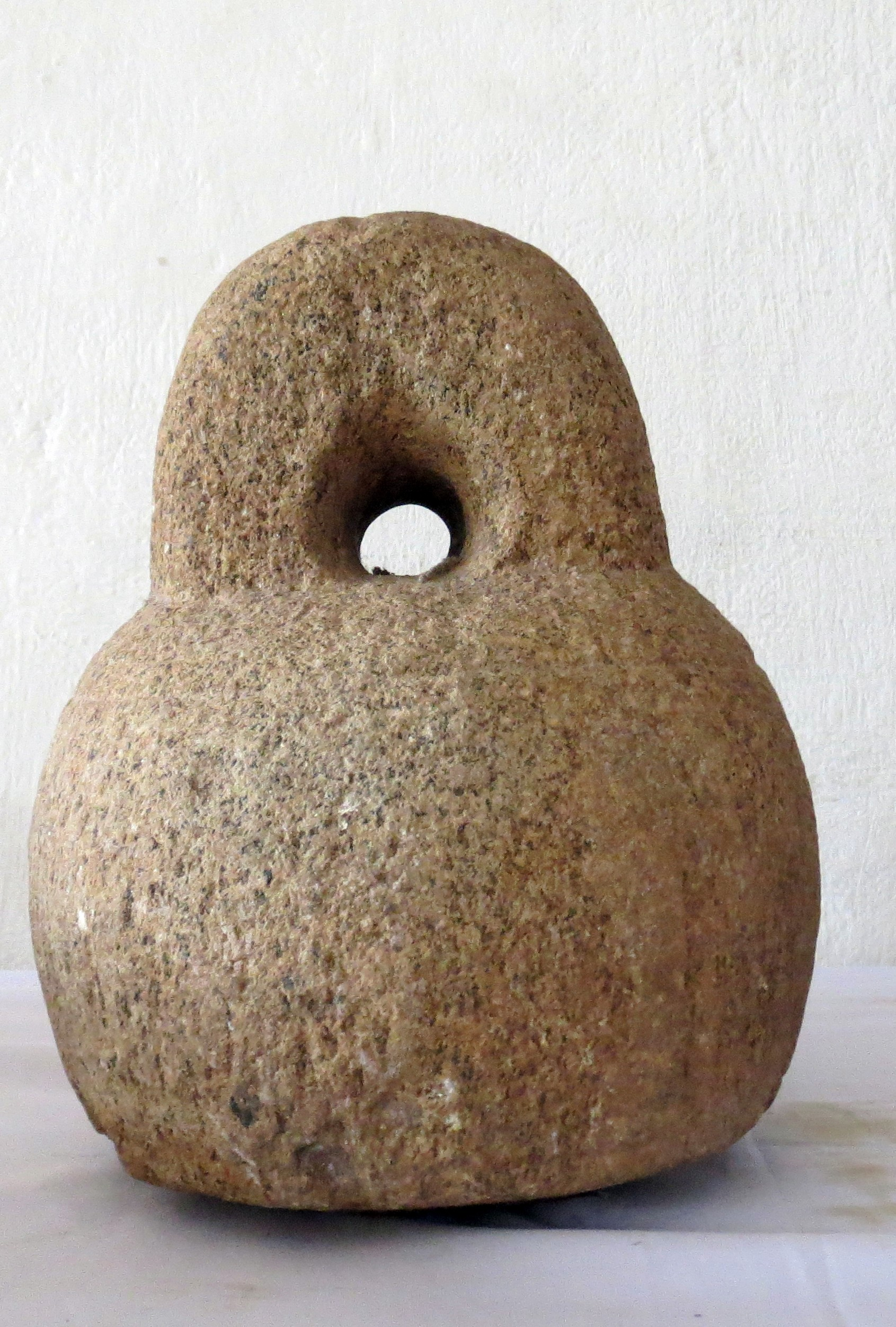
A one maund weighing stone of the Madras Presidency

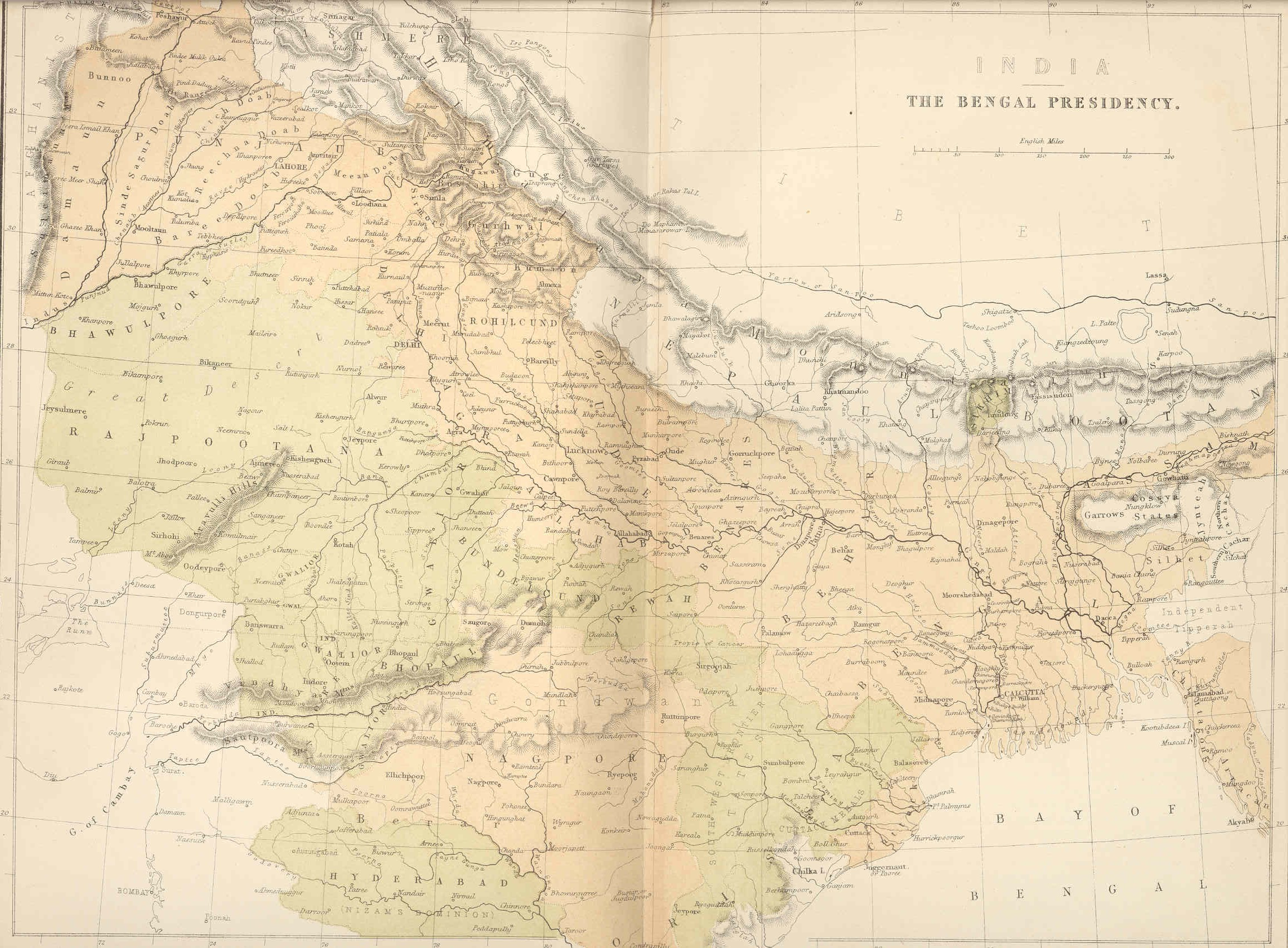
The vast extent of the Bengal Presidency (shown here in 1858) facilitated the adoption of the standard of 100 Troy pounds for the maund throughout British India.

The maund (/ˈmɔːnd/), mun or mann (Bengali: মণ; Urdu: من) is a traditional unit of mass used in British India, and also in Afghanistan, Persia, and Arabia: the same unit in the Mughal Empire was sometimes written as mann or mun in English, while the equivalent unit in the Ottoman Empire and Central Asia was called the batman. At different times, and in different South Asian localities, the mass of the maund has varied, from as low as 25 pounds (11 kg) to as high as 160 pounds (72 kg): even greater variation is seen in Persia and Arabia. One maund in Pakistan is measured as 40kg.

== History ==
In British India, the maund was first standardized in the Bengal Presidency in 1833, where it was set equal to 100 Troy pounds (82.28 lbs. av.). This standard spread throughout the British Raj. After the independence of India and Pakistan, the definition formed the basis for metrication, one maund becoming exactly 37.3242 kilograms. A similar metric definition is used in Bangladesh and Nepal. Throughout Bangladesh, one মণ/mun/mann is 40 kg. In Nepal's southern plains one Mann equals 40 kilograms and is generally used to measure agricultural output.

== South Asia ==
=== Delhi Sultanate ===
During the reign of Alauddin Khalji of the Delhi Sultanate, 1 mann was roughly equivalent to 15 kg.

=== Mughal Empire ===
Prinsep (1840) summarizes the evidence as to the weight of the mun (later "maund") during the reign (1556–1605) of Akbar the Great, which comes from the Ain-i-Akbari written by the vizier Abu'l-Fazl ibn Mubarak (anglicized as "Abul Fuzl"). The principal definition is that the mun is forty seers; and that each seer is thirty dams.

1 mun = 40 seers = 1200 dams

The problem arises in assigning the values of the smaller units.

The section of the Ain-i-Akbari that defines the mun also defines the dam as five tanks. A separate section defines the tank as twenty-four ruttees. However, by the 19th century, the tank was no longer a uniform unit across the former Mughal territories: Prinsep quotes values of 50 grains (3.24 g) in Darwar, 72 grains (4.67 g) in Bombay and 268 grains (17.37 g) in Ahmednugur.

The jilály, a square silver rupee coin issued by Akbar, was said by the Ain-i-Akbari to be 11 1/4 mashas in weight: surviving jilály and other Mughal rupee coins weigh 170–175 Troy grains (11.02–11.34 g), so the masha, defined as eight ruttees, would be about 15 1/2 grains (1 g). Masha weights sent back to London in 1819 agree with this value. This basis gives a mun of 34 3/4 lb. av. (15.75 kg). One Koni was 4 muns.

However, in yet another section of the Ain-i-Akbari, the dam is said to be "twenty mashas seven ruttees": using this definition would imply an Imperial mass of about 47 lb. av. (21.3 kg) for the mun. Between these two values, the maund in Central India was often found to be around 40 lb. av. (18 kg) in the East India Company survey of 1821.

A Maund was 55.5 British pounds mass under Akbar.

=== Nineteenth century ===
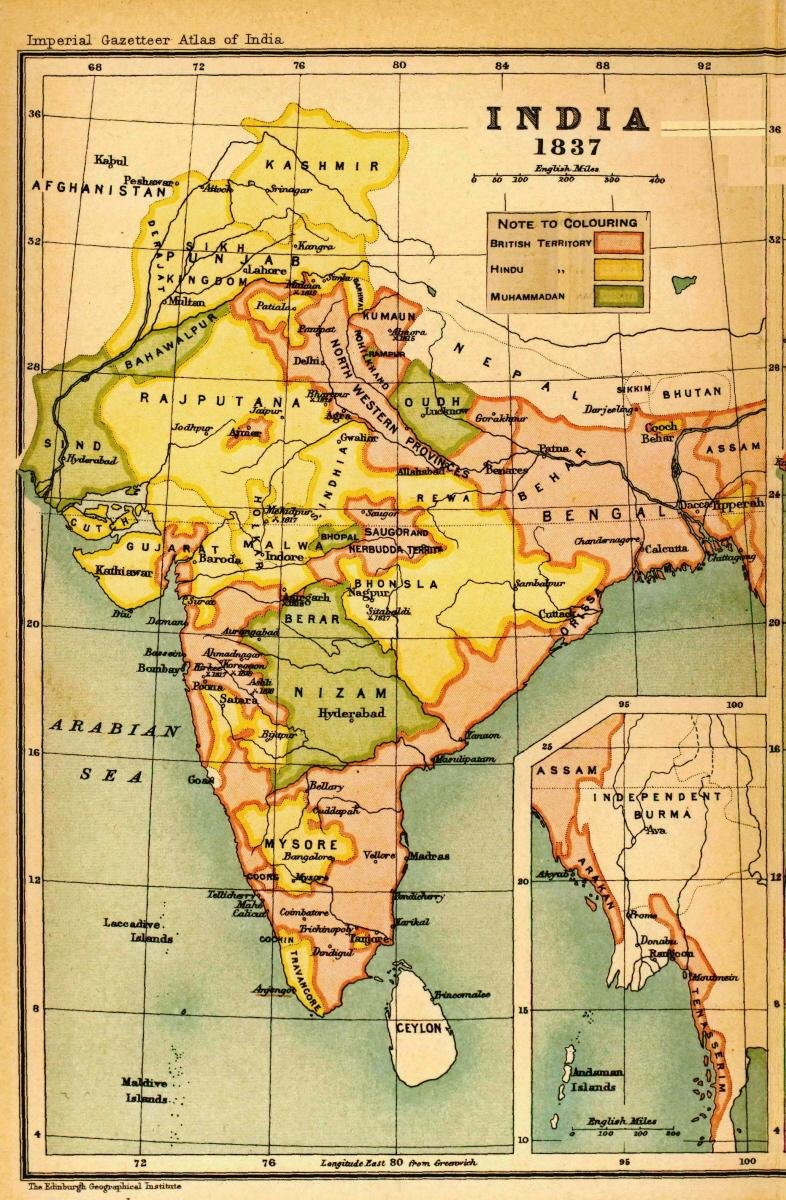
British India is shown in pink on this 1837 map. The Madras Presidency is in the southeast, the Bombay Presidency is in the west and the Bengal Presidency is in the northeast.

The maund of India may as a genus be divided into four different species:

1. That of Bengal, containing 40 seers, and averaging about 80 lbs. avoir.
2. That of Central India (Malwa, Ajmeer, &c.) generally equal to 40 lbs. avoir. and containing 20 seers (so that the seer of this large portion of the continent assimilates to that of Bengal.)
3. The maund of Guzerat and Bombay, equal to 1/4 cwt. or 28 pounds and divided into 40 seers of smaller grade.
4. The maund of Southern India, fixed by the Madras government at 25 lbs. avoir.

There are, however many other varieties of maund, from 15 to 64 seers in weight; which it is unnecessary to particularize.

— Prinsep (1840), p. 77

Prinsep's values for the maund come from a survey organized by the East India Company in 1821. The Company's agents were asked to send back examples of the standard weights and measures used in the places they were stationed, and these were compared with the English standards in London by Patrick Kelly, the leading British metrologist of the time. The results were published as an appendix to the second edition of Kelly's Universal Cambist (1831), and later as a separate book entitled Oriental Metrology (1832).

It will be seen from Kelly's results below that Prinsep's generalizations are only partially correct. The Gujarat maund is more closely related to the Central Indian maund than to the standardized Bombay maund, except in the town of Anjar, except that it is divided into 40 seers instead of 20 as was found in Malwa.

==== Central India and Gujarat ====
The towns where the maund was found to be approximately 40 lb. av. (18 kg) in the 1821 East India Company survey, superimposed onto a map of modern India.
The towns where the maund was found to be more than 130 lb. av. (59 kg) in the 1821 East India Company survey, superimposed onto a map of modern India.

Place (Note: Kelly's transliterations of place names have been retained, but the transliterations of names of districts have been updated where possible.)	Subdivision	Imperial			Metric kg
Place	Subdivision	lb.	oz.	dr.	Metric kg
Ahmadābād, in Gujarat	40 seers	42	4	13	19.817
Amod, in Broach	40 seers	40	8	12	
Anjar, in Cutch	40 seers	27	3	8	
Bairseah, in Malwa	40 seers	77	1	12	
Bārdoli, in Surat	39 3/4 seers, 2 pice	37	4	4 3/4	
Broach, in Gujarat	40 seers	40	8	12	
Baroda, in Gujarat	42 seers	44	9	10	
Cambay, in Gujarat	40 seers	37	8	0	
Chanadore, Central Provinces	64 seers	149	12	0	
Dewas, in Malwa	64 seers	137	8	2	
Doongurpoor, in Rajputana	40 seers	50	1	14	
Hānsot, in Broach	40 seers, "market"	38	9	9	
Hānsot, in Broach	42 seers, for oil	40	8	6	
Hānsot, in Broach	40 pergunna seers	39	3	10	
Indore, in Malwa	20 seers, for grain	40	8	6	
Indore, in Malwa	40 seers, for opium	81	0	12	
Jambusar, in Broach	40 seers, "market"	40	6	4	
Jambusar, in Broach	42 seers, for cotton	42	6	9	
Kota, in Rajputana	40 seers	30	0	0	
Kumbharia, in Surat	40 seers 8 pice	37	13	10	
Kurod, in Surat	40 seers 15 pice	37	15	8 1/2	
Malwa	20 seers	40	7	8	
Mundissor, in Malwa	15 seers	34	4	4 1/2	
Okalesur, in Broach	40 seers	38	8	13	
Okalesur, in Broach	40 seers, "pergunna"	40	6	13	
Omutwara, in Malwa	28 seers	54	10	8	
Oujein, in Malwa	16 7/8 seers	33	5	13	
Pertabgurh, in Ajmer	20 seers	38	8	14	
Rutlam, in Malwa	20 seers	40	7	8	
Surat, in Gujarat	40 seers	37	8	0	
Source: Kelly's Oriental Metrology (1832)

==== Bombay Presidency ====
The towns where the maund was found to be approximately 28 lb. av. (12 3/4 kg) in the 1821 East India Company survey, superimposed onto a map of modern India.

Place	Subdivision	Imperial			Metric kg
Place	Subdivision	lb.	oz.	dr.	Metric kg
Ahmadnagar	40 seers	78	15	12	
Aurangabad	40 seers	74	10	10	
Belgaum	44 seers	26	3	15	
Bombay	40 seers	28	0	0	
Carwar, in Kanara	42 seers	26	0	0	
Dindoor	64 seers	157	10	10	
Dukhun Poona	12 1/2 seers, for ghee, etc.	24	10	4 1/3	
Dukhun Poona	14 seers, for metals	27	9	9 2/3	
Dukhun Poona	48 seers, for grain	94	9	8	
Goa (Portuguese)	—	24	12	0	
Jamkhair, in Ahmednagar	64 seers	147	10	0	
Jaulnah, in Hyderabad	40 seers	80	2	8	
Onore, in Kanara	40–44 seers	25	0	0	
Poona	12 1/2 seers, for ghee, etc.	24	10	4 1/3	
Poona	14 seers, for metals	27	9	9 2/3	
Poona	48 seers, for grain	94	9	8	
Roombharee, in Ahmednagar	64 seers	160	13	8	
Source: Kelly's Oriental Metrology (1832)

==== Madras Presidency ====
The towns where the maund was found to be approximately 25 lb. av. (11 1/3 kg) in the 1821 East India Company survey, superimposed onto a map of modern India.

Place	Subdivision	Imperial			Metric kg
Place	Subdivision	lb.	oz.	dr.	Metric kg
Anjengo, in Travancore	—	28	0	0	
Bangalore, in Mysore	40 seers	25	0	0	
Bellary, in Madras	48 seers	25	6	0	
Calicut, in Malabar	68 seers	34	11	11	
Cochin, in Malabar	42 1/2 seers	27	2	11	
Coimbatoor, in Mysore	40 seers	24	1	0	
Colachy, in Travancore	125 pollums	18	12	13	
Hyderabad, in Madras	12 seers, "kucha"	23	13	0	
Hyderabad, in Madras	40 seers, "pucka"	79	6	0	
Madras	40 seers, or 8 vis	25	0	0	
Madura, in Carnatic	39.244 seers	25	0	0	
Mangalore	46 seers, "market"	28	2	4	
Mangalore	46 seers, "Company's"	28	8	13	
Mangalore	40 seers, for sugar	24	7	8	
Masulipatam, in Madras	"kucha"	35	10	0	
Masulipatam, in Madras	"pucka"	80	0	0	
Negapatam, in Carnatic	41.558 seers	25	0	0	
Pondicherry	8 vis	25	14	5 1/2	
Quilon, in Travancore	25 old Dutch pounds	27	5	8	
Sankeridroog, in Carnatic	41.256 seers	25	0	0	
Seringapatam	40 seers, "kucha"	24	4	8	
Tellicherry, in Malabar	64 seers	32	11	0	
Tranquebar, in Coromandel	68 Danish pounds	74	12	9.6	
Travancore, in Madras	—	25	0	6 1/2	
Trichinopoly, in Carnatic	13.114 seers	25	0	0	
Vizagapatam, in Madras	"kucha"	35	10	0	
Vizagapatam, in Madras	"pucka"	80	0	0	
Source: Kelly's Oriental Metrology (1832)

Maund was known as Mudi in Tulu language

==== Bengal ====
The towns where the maund was found to be approximately 80 lb. av. (36 kg) in the 1821 East India Company survey, superimposed onto a map of modern India.

Place	Subdivision	Imperial			Metric kg
Place	Subdivision	lb.	oz.	dr.	Metric kg
Calcutta	40 seers	82	4	9 1/7	
Luckipoor, in Bengal	40 seers	82	4	9 1/7	
Source: Kelly's Oriental Metrology (1832)
