= Batman (unit) =

Unit of mass used in the Ottoman Empire

The batman (Turkish pronunciation: [batˈman]) was a unit of mass used in the Ottoman Empire and among Turkic peoples of the Russian Empire. It has also been recorded as a unit of area in Uyghur-speaking regions of Central Asia. The name is Turkic (Ottoman Turkish: بطمان, romanized: baṭmān; Chagatay: bātmān), but was also sometimes used for the equivalent unit in Persia (من man). The equivalent unit in British India was anglicized as the maund (Bengali: মন and Hindustani: من). The value of the batman (or maund) varied considerably from place to place.

== Origins ==
The man as a unit of weight is thought to be of at least Chaldean origin, with Sir Henry Yule attributing Akkadian origins to the word. The Hebrew maneh (מנה) and the Ancient Greek mina (μνᾶ) are thought to be cognate. It was originally equal to one-ninth of the weight of an artaba of water, or approximately four kilograms in modern units. İnalcık believes the ancient Persian patimāna may have come from the late Assyrian word for 'mana of the king'. The man or batman spread throughout Arabia and Persia: it was adopted by the Ottoman Empire, and brought to India by the Mughal Empire. The first attestation which gives a comparison to European weights was by Pegolotti in his Pratica della mercatura, written about 1340. He reported the batman as the main unit of mass in Ayasluğ ("Altoluogo di Turchia" to Pegolotti; modern Selçuk, in western Turkey), equivalent to 32 Genoese pounds (libbre).

== Ottoman Empire ==
The batman (or bateman) was first recorded in English in 1599, in Babylon (probably modern Baghdad), where it was said to be equal to "7 pound and 5 ounces English weight". In the central Ottoman system of weights, the batman was equal to six okas, as is attested in 1811 in Aleppo, 1821 in Baghdad and in 1850 in Constantinople. At this point, the batman was equal to 16 lb 8 oz avoirdupois (7.484 kg).

=== Arabia ===
| Place (Note: Modern transliterations of place names have been used where possible.) | Local | Imperial | | | Metric kg |
| Place | Local | lb | oz | dr | Metric kg |
|---|---|---|---|---|---|
| Bayt al-Faqih | 1/10 frazil | 2 | 0 | 10 | 0.9249 |
| Jeddah | 30 uqiyyas | 2 | 3 | 9 3/5 | 1.0092 |
| Mokha | 40 uqiyyas | 3 | 5 | 0 | 1.5025 |
Source: Kelly's Oriental Metrology (1832)

The mann ( مَنّ ) had doubtless formed a part of the Arabian system of weights before the arrival of the Ottomans. It was divided into uqiyyas (the number varying with the location), while ten mann made one frazil. A still larger unit of mass was the bahar, of ten to forty frazils. The Arabic mann was smaller than the Ottoman batman at about 2–3 lb av. (1–1½ kg), except in Basra where there were two maunds in use, both much larger than either the Arabic mann or the Ottoman batman.

=== Turkey ===
The Turkish system of weights and measures was metricated in 1931. The oka was redefined as exactly one kilogram, while the batman became ten okas (10 kg).

== Central Asia ==
The batman was used in Central Asia up until at least the 18th century. In Khiva in 1740, there were said to be two batmans (as in Persia): the "great batman" of 18 Russian pounds (фунт, funt; approx. 7.4 kg) and the "lesser batman" of 9¼ Russian pounds (approx. 3.8 kg).

In Uyghur, the batman was also a measure of land area, the area that could be sown with one batman (in mass) of seed.

== Idel-Ural ==
The Tatar batman is an equivalent to 4 pood or 65.5 kg.

== Persia ==
| Place | Local | Imperial | | | Metric kg |
| Place | Local | lb | oz | dr | Metric kg |
|---|---|---|---|---|---|
| Bandar-Abbas ("Gamron") | tabrézy | 6 | 12 | 0 | 3.0617 |
| Bandar-Abbas ("Gamron") | sháhy | 13 | 8 | 0 | 6.1235 |
| Bushehr | 720 mithqals | 7 | 10 | 15 | 3.4852 |
| Shiraz | 600 mithqals | 12 | 10 | 14.4 | 5.7521 |
| Tabriz | 300 mithqals | 6 | 5 | 7.2 | 2.8761 |
Source: Kelly's Oriental Metrology (1832)

The two main commercial weights in Persia were the tabrézy man ( من تبریز ), literally the man of Tabriz, and the sháhy man ( من شاء ), literally the Shah's man, which was twice as large. The sháhy man was particularly used in Shiraz and Isfahan. Kelly also distinguishes a man used for copra and "provisions" at Gamron (modern Bandar-Abbas) of 7 lb 12 oz av. (3.5153 kg).

The United Nations Statistical Office found a wide range of values for the man in Iran in 1966, from 3 kg to 53 kg. The man was divided into mithqals (the number depending on the locality): larger subdivisions included the abbassi and the ratl. The term batman appears to be reserved for the tabrézy man, approximately 2.969 kg in 1966.

=== Afghanistan ===
The mann (Pashto: من) was and still is also used as a unit of mass in Afghanistan, but varied widely between different localities. In Kandahar it was about 8 lb av. (3½ kg), while in Peshawar it was 80 lb av. (35 kg).
