= Andrew Mackay =

Andrew Mackay, MacKay or McKay may refer to:

- Andrew Mackay (mathematician) (1760–1809), Scottish mathematician
- Andrew MacKay (Canadian politician) (fl. 1908–1911), member of the Legislative Assembly of Ontario
- Andy Mackay (born 1946), English musician, founder of Roxy Music
- Andrew MacKay (British politician) (born 1949), British Conservative politician
- Andrew Mackay (British Army officer) (fl. 1979–2009), British Army major general
- Andrew McKay (Australian footballer) (born 1970), Australian rules footballer
- Andrew Mackay (Australian politician), member of the Northern Territory Legislative Assembly from 2024
- Andrew McKay (soccer) (fl. 1983–2001), Scottish-born American soccer player
- Andy McKay (born 1980), New Zealand cricketer
- Andrew McKay (actor) (born 1981), English actor
- Andrew Mackay (swimmer) (born 1985), Olympic swimmer from the Cayman Islands

== See also ==
- William Andrew MacKay (1929–2013), Canadian lawyer
