= Kumbhariya =

Several places are named Kumbhariya or Kumbharia in Gujarat, India.

- Kumbhariya, Surat district, a village
- Kumbharia, Kutch District, Gujarat a village near Anjar
- Kumbhariya, Banaskantha district, a village near Ambaji

== See also ==
- Kumbhar, a caste in India
