= John Duncan (weaving writer) =

Scottish weaver

John Duncan (fl. 1800–1818) was a Scottish weaver who wrote an authoritative book about weaving in 1808.

== Biography ==
John Duncan came from Glasgow, but nothing has so far been found about his ancestry. He was the inventor of a patent tambouring machine (Patent No 2769, of 1804). This was an early sewing machine, for "raising flowers, figures and other ornaments on muslins, lawns, silks, woollens, or mixed cloths". Duncan may have used the chain stitch, which was employed for tambour lace, as was later done by Barthélemy Thimonnier. Sometimes Duncan's invention has been described as the first embroidering machine; as with other pioneering machines of the period, it was unsuccessful.

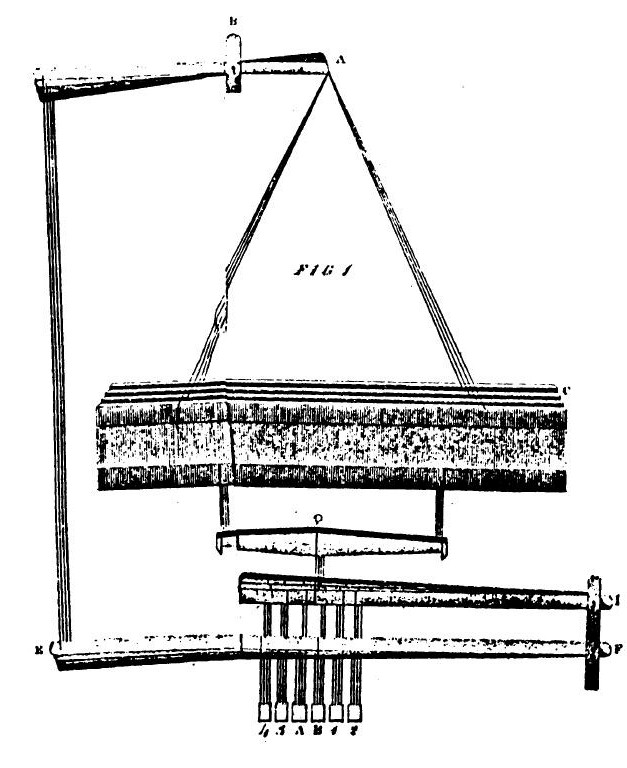
Plate from Practical and Descriptive Essays on the Art of Weaving (1808).

== Works ==
Duncan's major work was Practical and Descriptive Essays on the Art of Weaving (Glasgow, 1808). It was later said, by Clinton G. Gilroy, to be an unacknowledged source used in Andrew Ure's Philosophy of Manufactures.

Duncan wrote an account of his tambouring machine in the Edinburgh Encyclopædia, article "Chain Work," according to Harte. (p. 124)

Duncan was also the probable author of the "Cloth Manufacture" article in Volume 6 of the Edinburgh Encyclopedia, signed "(J.D.)" The entry contains "a description of a loom invented by the author of this article," which purports to improve upon the vertical loom of Mr. Johnson, also discussed in the entry. Figures 3 and 4 of Plate CXCV, entitled "Vibrating Loom," illustrate his invention.

Duncan also wrote articles for Rees's Cyclopædia on:

- Draught and Cording of Looms (Vol 12, 1809)
- Draw Loom (Vol 12, 1809)
- Hundreds (Vol 18, 1811)
- Weaving (Vol 38, 1818)

and is possibly the author of:

- Flax (Vol 14, 1810)
- Silk (Vol 32, 1815/16)
- Stocking Frame (Vol 34 1816)

and perhaps the short articles on:

- Diaper (Vol 11, 1808)
- Dimity (Vol 11, 1808)
- Dornock (Vol 12, 1809).
