= John Clennell =

John Clennell (1772–1822) was a journalist.

== Biography ==
Clennell's father was a hat-manufacturer in Newcastle on Tyne. Intended for the church, Clennell went into the family firm to support his widowed mother; and then manufactured pins. He was unsuccessful in business, and therefore became a teacher.

Clennell moved to Hackney, London in 1816. He was a contributor to the Commercial and Agricultural Magazine, and attracted many supporters while working on a new journal, assisted by the chemist John Sadler. He wrote for Nicholson's Journal, and was editor of the Tradesman.

He was a contributor to Rees's Cyclopædia, but it is not known on what topics he contributed.

== Writings ==
- Thoughts on the Expediency of disclosing the processes of Manufactories, 1807. This a pamphlet with the texts of two lectures the author gave to the Literary and Philosophical Society of Newcastle upon Tyne.
