= James Macartney (anatomist) =

Irish anatomist (1770–1843)

James Macartney FRS
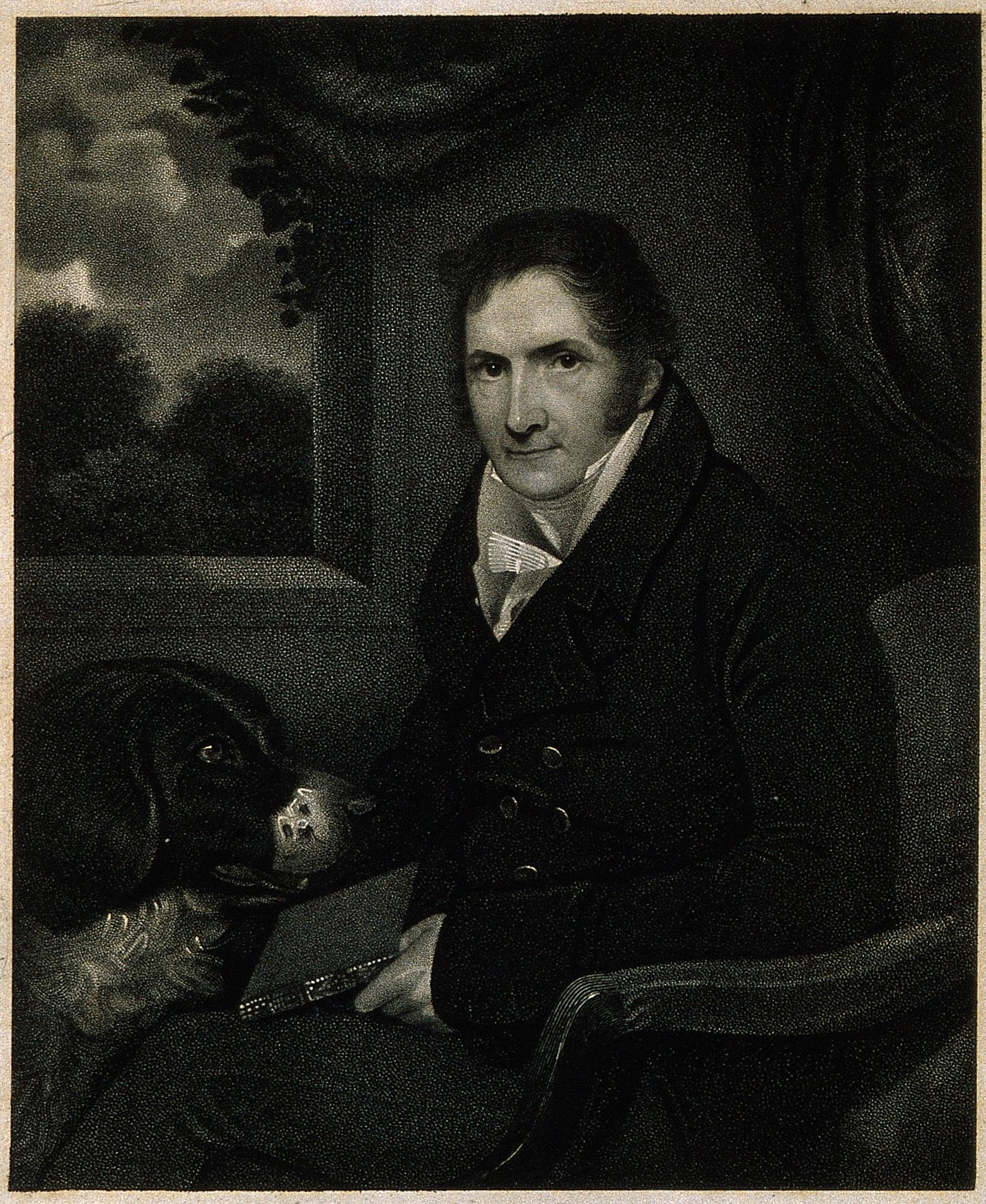
- Born: 8 March 1770; Armagh
- Died: 6 March 1843 (aged 72); Dublin
- Occupation: anatomist

James Macartney (born 8 March 1770 in Armagh, died 6 March 1843 in Dublin) was an Irish anatomist. He began life as an Irish volunteer in 1780, and was afterwards educated at the endowed classical school at Armagh, and then at a private school. He was associated for a time with the Sheares brothers and Lord Edward Fitzgerald, the United Irishmen but, being dissatisfied with their programme, he cut himself adrift and began to study medicine.

== Biography ==
He apprenticed himself to William Hartigan (1756?–1812) on 10 February 1793, his master being president of the Royal College of Surgeons of Ireland in 1797. Macartney also entered as a pupil in the college school, Mercer Street, Dublin, where he made some dissections for the museum, and he attended the Lock hospital and the Dublin dispensary. In 1796 he came to London to attend the Hunterian or Great Windmill Street school of medicine, and he became an occasional pupil at St. Thomas's and Guy's hospitals. He also attended the lectures of John Abernethy at St. Bartholomew's Hospital, and through his influence was appointed a demonstrator of anatomy in the medical school in 1798. He was admitted a member of the Royal College of Surgeons of England on 6 February 1800, began to practise in London as a surgeon, and was appointed lecturer on comparative anatomy and physiology at St. Bartholomew's Hospital, a post he held from March 1800 to 1811. On 21 Feb. 1811, he was elected F.R.S., and from 1803 to 1812 he served as surgeon to the Royal Radnor Militia.

In May 1813 he was admitted M.D. of St. Andrews University, and on 21 June 1813 he was elected professor of anatomy and surgery in the University of Dublin, and physician to Sir Patrick Dun's hospital. These offices he resigned in 1837, after he had raised the medical school to a much better position than it had ever before occupied. During almost the whole of his residence in Dublin Macartney was subjected to a very singular exhibition of petty persecution and open insult at the hands of some members of the board of Trinity College. He was denied the privilege of election to the fellowship of the Royal College of Surgeons, though he was made an honorary fellow of the Royal College of Physicians of Ireland in 1818. He also received an honorary M.D. from the University of Cambridge (31 August 1833), to which he sold his museum in 1836, the University of Dublin having refused to purchase it. He died at 31 Upper Merrion Street, Dublin, on 6 March 1843 (Gent. Mag. 1843, i. 554). He married on 10 August 1795 a Miss Ekenhead.

An ill-used and greatly misunderstood man, "he was," says Professor Alexander Macalister,

an expert anatomist and a philosophical biologist far in advance of his period. His description of the vascular system of birds has in many respects not been surpassed, and his account of the anatomy of mammals may be read with more profit than many modern works. In his account of the brain of the chimpanzee compared with that of an idiot, as well as in many others of his papers, there are glimpses of a morphology far beyond Cuvier, whose works he edited. His book on inflammation may be placed side by side with any pathological work of the period, while his researches on animal luminosity form the basis of many subsequent researches on the subject.

Macartney discovered the fibrous texture of the white substance in the brain, and the connection between the subcortical nerve fibres and the grey matter of the cerebral hemispheres. He gave, too, the first satisfactory account of rumination in the herbivora, and he discovered numerous glandular appendages in the digestive organs of mammals, especially of rodents. As one of Warburton's advisers and as a practical anatomist with great experience in teaching, he had much to do in shaping the Anatomy Act 1832.

== Writings ==
- Lectures on Comparative Anatomy (Cuvier's lectures translated by W. Ross under the inspection of J. Macartney), 1802, 2 vols.
- Observations on Curvature of the Spine, Dublin, 1817, 4to.
- A Treatise on Inflammation, London, 1838, 4to; reissued in America, Philadelphia, 1840.

He also wrote numerous papers in the Philosophical Transaction and his articles on comparative anatomy are published in Abraham Rees's Cyclopædia London, 1802–1819. These were:

- Anatomy, Comparative and Anatomy, Vegetable, (Vol 1), 1802
- Bezoar and Beast (Vol 2), 1802/3
- Birds, anatomy (Vol 3),1803/4
- Branch, Bud and Bulb, all vegetable anatomy (Vol 5), 1805
- Classification of animals for comparative anatomy (Vol 8), 1807
- Fish or Fishes, Anatomy of (Vol 14), 1810
- Incubation in comparative anatomy (Vol 19), 1811
- Mammals, anatomy of (Vol 22), 1812

Macartney noted in his diary that he was now engaged as a regular contributor at a higher rate than any other because at that time no other person understood the subject. William Lawrence, FRS, a fellow lecturer and surgeon at St. Bartholomew's and a former pupil of Macartney, wrote articles on Insects, Reptiles and Vermes that Macartney did not have time to do.

== Bibliography ==
- James Macartney, a memoir by Professor Alexander Macalister, F.R.S., of Cambridge, London, 1900;
- Sir Charles A. Cameron's History of the Royal College of Surgeons of Ireland, pp. 371, 372;
- ‘Erinensis's’ account of the appearance and methods of Macartney in the Lancet, 1825, viii. 248–52.
