= John Bonnycastle =

John Bonnycastle (baptized 29 December 1751 in Hardwick or Whitchurch, England – 15 May 1821 in Woolwich, England) was an English teacher of mathematics and author.

== Life ==
John Bonnycastle was born in Buckinghamshire, in about 1750. Nothing is known of his family or early life, but he went to London where he established an Academy. He became a tutor to the two sons of the Earl of Pontefract at Easton in Northumberland. Between 1782 and 1785, he was appointed Professor of Mathematics at the Royal Military Academy, Woolwich, where he remained until his death on 15 May 1821.

He was a prolific writer, and wrote for the early volumes of Rees's Cyclopædia, about algebra, analysis and astronomy.

== Family ==
At the age of 19, he married Miss Rolt, but she died young. On Oct.7th, 1786 he married Brigette Newell with whom he had six children Charlotte, William, Mary, Sir Richard (Royal Engineer/Author), Humphrey and Charles.

His son Richard Henry Bonnycastle settled in Canada, where the family became quite well known in Winnipeg and Calgary.

His son, Charles Bonnycastle (1796-1840) became a Professor of Mathematics at the University of Virginia.

== Writings ==
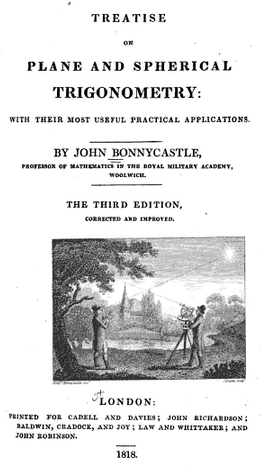

- The Scholar's guide to Arithmetic, 1780
- Introduction to Algebra, 1782
- Introduction to Astronomy, 1786 (7th edition 1816)
- Euclid's 'Elements' with notes, 1789
- A Treatise on Plane and Spherical Geometry, 1806
- A Treatise of Algebra, 1813
