= Richard Pearson (physician) =

English physician and medical writer

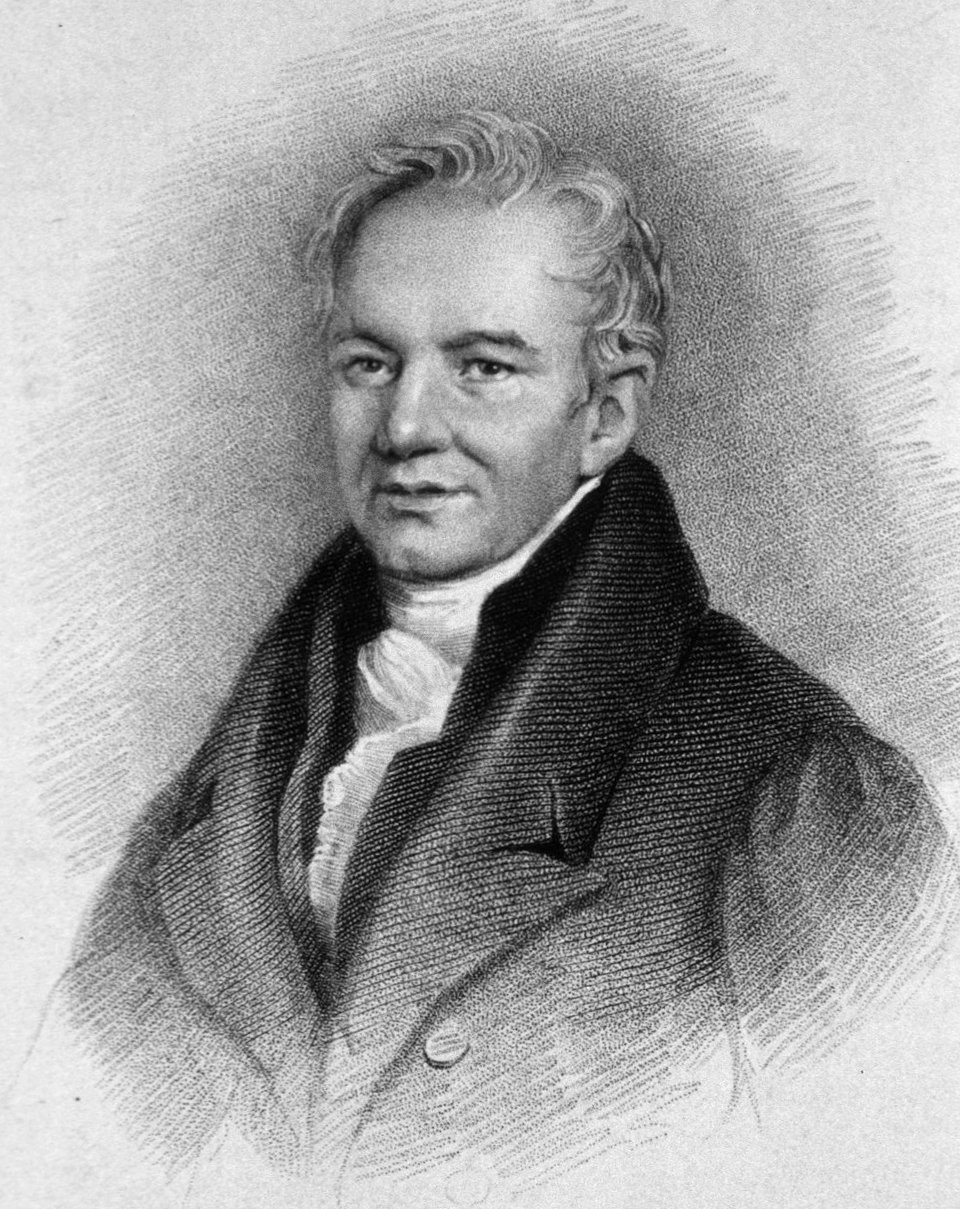
Richard Pearson

Richard Pearson (1765 – 11 January 1836) was an English physician and medical writer.

== Life ==
He was born in Birmingham. After education at Sutton Coldfield grammar school, he began medical study under Mr. Tomlinson in Birmingham. He went on to the University of Edinburgh, where he graduated M.D. on 24 June 1786. While a student he became president of the Royal Medical Society, as well as of the Natural History Society in the university.

After graduating Pearson travelled in France, Germany, and Italy for two years with Thomas Knox, Lord Northland. On 22 December 1788 he was admitted a licentiate of the College of Physicians of London, and began practice at Birmingham, where he became physician to the General Hospital in September 1792.

In 1801 Pearson resigned his hospital appointment and settled in London, where he lived in Bloomsbury Square. After 1812 he moved to Reading, Berkshire; then to Sutton Coldfield; and back to Birmingham, where he was one of the founders of the medical school.

Pearson died at Birmingham on 11 January 1836, and was buried at St. Paul's Chapel there.

== Works ==
While a student, Pearson was awarded a gold medal from the Royal Humane Society for an essay on the means of distinguishing death from suspended animation. His inaugural dissertation was on scrofula, and was published at Edinburgh in 1786. He recommended electrical treatment for the cure of enlarged lymphatic glands.

In 1795, Pearson published A Short Account of the Nature and Properties of different kinds of Airs so far as relates to their Medicinal Use, intended as an introduction to the Pneumatic Way of Treating Diseases, and in 1798 The Arguments in Favour of an Inflammatory Diathesis in Hydrophobia considered, in which he combats the then prevalent opinion of John Ferriar of Manchester that general inflammation and inflammation of the fauces were the chief pathological conditions in hydrophobia. Pearson expressed the opinion that the case of Dr. Christopher Nugent (died 1775) was one of hysteria, and recommended the omission of bleeding in such cases, the administration of wine, and the application of caustics in regions distant from the bite. In 1799 he published Observations on the Bilious Fever of 1797, 1798, and 1799.

He published in 1803 Observations on the Epidemic Catarrhal Fever or Influenza of 1803. An influenza epidemic had begun in London in February, and spread all over England; and this work, after a statement of the clinical features of the disease, discusses its treatment, and concludes with some letters from practitioners in country districts. Pearson described the severe depression observed as a frequent sequel of influenza. An epidemic of bubonic plague was seen in 1804, and he published Outlines of a Plan calculated to put a Stop to the Progress of the Malignant Contagion which rages on the Shores of the Mediterranean. Two treatises on materia medica in 1807 were his next publications: Thesaurus Medicaminum, which reached a fourth edition in 1810, and A Practical Synopsis of the materia Alimentaria and Materia Medica, of which a second edition appeared in 1808. In 1812 he published Account of a Particular Preparation of Salted Fish, and in 1813 A Brief Description of the Plague.

He contributed articles to Rees's Cyclopædia. The topics are not known, but probably medical.

In 1835, he published Observations on the Action of the Broom Seed in Dropsical Affections. He also wrote medical articles in Rees's Cyclopædia and in the British Critic and took part in the abridgment of the Philosophical Transactions.
