= Charles Taylor (calico printer and dyer) =

English calico printer and dyer

Charles Taylor (died 1816) was a Manchester calico printer and dyer, who later became Secretary of the Society of Arts.

== Biography ==
Little is known about his origins, but he was an M. D. He was a partner in the Manchester firm of Taylor and Maxwell, fustian manufacturers, dyers and printer, and was involved with the development of printing machinery for calico in about 1770. About 1785 Taylor set up a dye-house in Manchester for Turkey Red dyeing.

Taylor and Maxwell were early experimenters in the use of 'dephlogisticated marine acid' (chlorine) following the work of Berthollet and Scheele. The idea was suggested to Taylor by Dr Richard Kirwan F.R.S. and according to the article on 'Bleaching' in Rees's Cyclopædia, which Taylor wrote:

... a whole piece of calico, in the state received from the loom, was in the spring of 1788 actually bleached white, printed in permanent colours and produced in the Manchester market ready for sale, having undergone all these operations in less than 48 hours by the joint efforts of Mr. Cooper, Mr. Baker and Mr Taylor, which is perhaps the first time an entire piece, either in France or England, that fully ascertained the real merits of a new mode of bleaching, and certainty that it might be generally useful in commerce.

In 1788 they took as an apprentice James Watt Jr. (1769-1848)

Taylor retired from his Manchester business in 1800 and in February of that year was appointed Secretary to the Society of Arts, a post he held until his death in 1816.

== Works ==
For Rees's Cyclopædia he contributed articles on:

- Bleaching, vol 4, 1805
- Crimson, vol 10, 1808
- Dying, history of, vol 12, 1808
- Fustian. vol 15, 1810
