= Tatar units of measurement =

Traditional system of measurement used by Tatars

Traditional Tatar units of measurement were used by Tatars until 1924 but became obsolete when the Soviet Union adopted the metric system.

The Tatar system shares many units with the Russian system (e.g. sajın and disätinä), which is close to the English (the Russian system under Peter the Great was redefined relative to the English system), therefore a duym is relatively equal to an inch. This list includes their Tatar language names.

== Length ==
- Duym (дюйм), thumb = 30 mm
- Qarış (вершок) = 44.45 mm
- Fut (foot)
  - 1 Fut = 12 duym = 304.8 mm
- Çirek, qarış or söyäm (пядь)
  - 1 Çirek = 4 qarış = 177.8 mm
- Arşın (аршин)
  - 1 Arşın = 4 cirek = 16 qarış = 28 dúym = 711.2 mm
- Sajın, qolaç or tayaq (сажень)
  - 1 Sajın = 3 arşın = 7 fut = 2.133 m
- Çaqrım (верста)
  - 1 Çaqrım = 500 sajın = 1.0668 km
- Färsäx or parasang
  - 1 Färsäx = 6-7 çaqrım = 6.400-7.467 km
- Mil (миля), geographical mile
  - 1 Mil = 7 çaqrım = 7.467 km
- Atnı tuqtawsız yurıyu, the distance a horse travels without stops
  - 1 Atnı tuqtawsız yurıyu = 15–25 km
- Cäyäwleneñ könlek yulı, a day of riding
  - 1 Cäyäwleneñ könlek yulı = 35 çaqrım = 37.338 km
- Atnıñ könlek yulı, the distance a horse travels in one day, equal to 40–50 km
- Cäyäwleneñ aylıq yulı, a month of riding, equal to 1120.14 km
  - 1 Cäyäwleneñ aylıq yulı = 1050 çaqrım

== Area ==
- Quadrat sajın
  - 1 Quadrat sajın = 1 sajın^{2} = 4.552 m^{2}
- Cärib
  - 1 Cärib = 3600 arşın^{2} = 1820.9 m^{2}
- Disätinä (десятина)
  - 1 Disätinä = 2400 Quadrat sajın = 10,925.4 m^{2} = 1.09254 ha
- Çirek
  - 1 Çirek = 1/2 disätinä = 5462.7 m^{2}
- Quadrat çaqrım
  - 1 Quadrat çaqrım = 1 çaqrım^{2} = 1.138 km^{2}

== Volume ==
- Garnets (гарнец) = 3.279 L
- Çirektän sigez (четверик)
  - 1 Çirektän sigez = 8 garnets = 26.238 L
- Çirek (четверть)
  - 1 Çirek = 64 garnets = 8 Çirektän sigez = 209.91 L
- Çiläk (ведро) = 12,299 L
- Podawqa (пудовка)
  - 1 pot, the volume of 16 kg of water
- Poçıq
  - 1 Poçıq = 2 pot = the volume of 32 kg of water
- Batman
  - 1 batman = 4 pot

== Mass ==
- Öleş (допя) = 44.434 mg
- Mısqal (золотник)
  - 1 Mısqal = 96 öleş = 4.265 g
- Lot (лот)
  - 1 Lot = 3 mısqal = 12.797 g
- Qadaq or göränkä (фунт)
  - 1 Qadaq = 32 lot = 96 mısqal = 409.5 g
- Pot (пуд)
  - 1 pot = 40 qadaq = 16.380 kg
- Qantar
  - 1 Qantar = 2 1/2 pot = 40.951 kg
- *Berkovets (берковец)
  - 1 Berkovets = 10 pot = 163.805 kg
