= William Blair (surgeon) =

English surgeon

William Blair (28 January 1766 – 6 December 1822) was an English surgeon with an interest in ciphers and stenography. He was known also for contributing articles to Rees's Cyclopædia.

== Biography ==
William Blair was born in 1766 in Lavenham, Suffolk. He was the youngest son of William Blair, M.D., and his wife Ann Gideon. He qualified as a surgical practice in London under Mr. J. Pearson of Golden Square, who introduced him to the London Lock Hospital, and when a vacancy arose he was given a position as a surgeon to that charity. Blair was an M.A. but it is not known where he graduated. He became very eminent in his profession, and was surgeon to the Asylum, the Finsbury Dispensary, the Bloomsbury Dispensary for the Relief of the Sick Poor in Great Russell Street, the Female Penitentiary at Cumming House, Pentonville, and the New Rupture Society.

He was a member of the Royal College of Surgeons, London, and of the medical societies of London, Paris, Brussels, and Aberdeen. For some time he was editor of the London Medical Review and Magazine. Blair was a keen Methodist, and worked in the cause of the British and Foreign Bible Society, to which he presented his valuable collection of rare and curious editions of the Bible, and many scarce commentaries in different languages. What is presumably the remaining portion of his library was sold at auction by R. H. Evans on 7 February 1823 and three following days; a copy of the catalogue is at Cambridge University Library (shelfmark Munby.c.126(3)). He attempted lectures on anatomy and other subjects, but with little success. On his wife's death in March 1822 he resolved to give up professional practice, and to retire into the country. He took a house in the neighbourhood of Colchester, but before the preparations for removing were completed he was seized with illness, and died at his residence in Great Russell Street, Bloomsbury on 6 December 1822.

William Blair's portrait was painted by and presented to the Bloomsbury Dispensary by Henry Meyer.

== Ciphers and stenography ==
Blair was greatly interested in ciphers and stenography and wrote articles about the subject in Rees's Cyclopædia. David Kahn, in his work The Code breakers (1967), characterized Blair's "superb article" as "the finest treatise in English on cryptology" until Parker Hitt's military manual was published by the U.S. Army in 1916. Blair's article on ciphers from the American edition of the Cyclopedia has been digitized and can be linked from the website about the Beale ciphers.

== Works ==
- The Soldier's Friend, containing familiar instructions to the loyal volunteers, yeomanry corps, and military men in general, on the preservation and recovery of their health, 1798
- Essays on the Venereal Disease and its concomitant Effects, 1798,
- Anthropology, or the Natural History of Man, with a comparative view of the structure and functions of animated beings in general, 1805
- The Vaccine Contest, being an exact outline of the arguments adduced by the principal combatants on both sides respecting Cow-Pox inoculation, including a late official report by the medical council of the Royal Jennerian Society, 1806
- Hints for the consideration of Parliament in a letter to Dr. Jenner on the supposed failure of vaccination at Ringwood, including a report of the Royal Jennerian Society, also remarks on the prevalent abuse of variolous inoculation, and on the exposure of out-patients attending at the Small-pox Hospital, 1808
- Prostitutes Reclaimed and Penitents Protected, being an answer to some objections against the Female Penitentiary, 1809
- Strictures on Mr. Hale's reply to the pamphlets lately published in defence of the London Penitentiary, 1809
- The Pastor and Deacon examined, or remarks on the Rev. John Thomas's appeal in vindication of Mr. Hale's character, and in opposition to Female Penitentiaries, 1810
- The Correspondence on the Formation, Objects, and Plan of the Roman Catholic Bible Society, 1814
- The Revival of Popery, its intolerant character, political tendency, encroaching demands, and unceasing usurpations, in letters to William Wilberforce, 1819
- A New Alphabet of Fifteen Letters, including the vowels,’ in William Harding's ‘Universal Stenography 2nd edit. 1824.
- MS letters about his method of Secret Writing, containing original letters to him on the subject from the Right Hon. W. Windham, G. Canning, the Earl of Harrowby, J. Symmons of Paddington, and Michael Gage of Swaffham, with the whole of his system of ciphers, were sold at the dispersal of William Upcott's collection in 1846.

For Rees's Cyclopædia he contributed articles on Surgery as well as:

- Cipher, Vol 8, (1807)
- Stenography, Vol 34, (1816)
