= Andrew Mackay (mathematician) =

Scottish mathematician (1760–1809)

Andrew Mackay (1760–1809) was a Scottish mathematician and astronomer, known as a teacher of navigation.

== Life ==
He lived in Aberdeen, where he was in October 1781, appointed unsalaried keeper of the observatory on the Castle hill. There he made calculated the latitude and longitude of his native town (see infra). He was awarded an honorary doctorate (LLD) by Aberdeen University in 1786. In 1793, he was elected a Fellow of the Royal Society of Edinburgh (FRSE). His proposers were Dugald Stewart, James Gregory, and John Playfair.

He was also an honorary member of the Literary and Philosophical Society of Newcastle-on-Tyne, and mathematical examiner to the corporation of Trinity House (1805–9) and to the East India Company.

In his later years Mackay took pupils in London at his house in George Street, Trinity Square; he taught mathematics and natural philosophy, navigation, architecture, and engineering.

He died in London on 3 August 1809, leaving a widow and children, and was buried in Allhallows Churchyard in Barking. Mackay's library was sold in London by auction by Leigh & Sotheby on 9 February 1810 (and following day); a copy of the catalogue is held at Cambridge University Library (shelfmark Munby.c.167[1]).

== Works ==
Mackay contributed to the theory of navigation, and was a calculator of mathematical tables. His main works are:

- The Theory and Practice of finding the Longitude at Sea or on Land: to which are added various Methods of Determining the Latitude of a Place by Variation of the Compass: with new Tables, published by subscription, 1793, 2 vols.; 2nd edit., with author's portrait, 1801; 3rd edit. 1810. In this work is given an account of a new method of finding the longitude and latitude of a ship at sea, together with the apparent time, from the same set of observations; for which the author had received the thanks of the boards of longitude of England and France.
- A Collection of Mathematical Tables, 1804.
- The Complete Navigator, 1804; 2nd edit. 1810. The preface contains criticisms of the books on navigation then in current use.

Other works are:

- A Comparison of different Methods of Solving Halley's Problem.
- Description and Use of the Sliding Rule in Arithmetic and in the Mensuration of Surfaces and Solids, &c., 1799; 2nd edit. 1806.
- The Commencement of the Nineteenth Century determined upon unerring Principles, Aberdeen, 1800. The object of this tract was to explain that the century began on 1 January 1800 and not on 1 January 1801.
- Description and Use of the Sliding Gunter in Navigation, Aberdeen, 1802; 2nd edit. Leith, 1812, edited by Alexander Ingram, with portrait of author prefixed.

He also contributed articles to the Encyclopædia Britannica, third edition (1797), on "Navigation", "Parallax", "Pendulum", "Projection of the Sphere", "Shipbuilding", and (naval) "Tactics"; and he was a contributor to Rees's Cyclopædia. He published a paper on the latitude and longitude of Aberdeen in the Philosophical Transactions of the Royal Society of Edinburgh, vol. iv. Examples of Mackay as a computer are in the Scriptores Logarithmici of Francis Maseres, vol. vi.
