= McKerrow =

McKerrow is a surname. Notable people with the surname include:

- Amanda McKerrow (born 1964), American ballet dancer
- Bob McKerrow (born 1948), New Zealand humanitarian and writer
- Clarence McKerrow (1877–1959), Canadian lacrosse player
- James McKerrow (1834–1919), New Zealand astronomer and surveyor
- Ronald Brunlees McKerrow (1872–1940), British bibliographer and Shakespearean scholar
- Shirley McKerrow (born 1933), Australian politician
- William McKerrow (1803-1878), Scottish-born, Manchester-based Presbyterian minister, radical activist and newspaper co-founder
- William Stuart McKerrow (1922–2004), British geologist and palaeontologist

== See also ==
- Lake McKerrow, a lake of New Zealand
- McKerrow, Ontario
- Mount McKerrow, a mountain of Antarctica
