= Samuel Parkes (chemist) =

British manufacturing chemist (1761–1825)

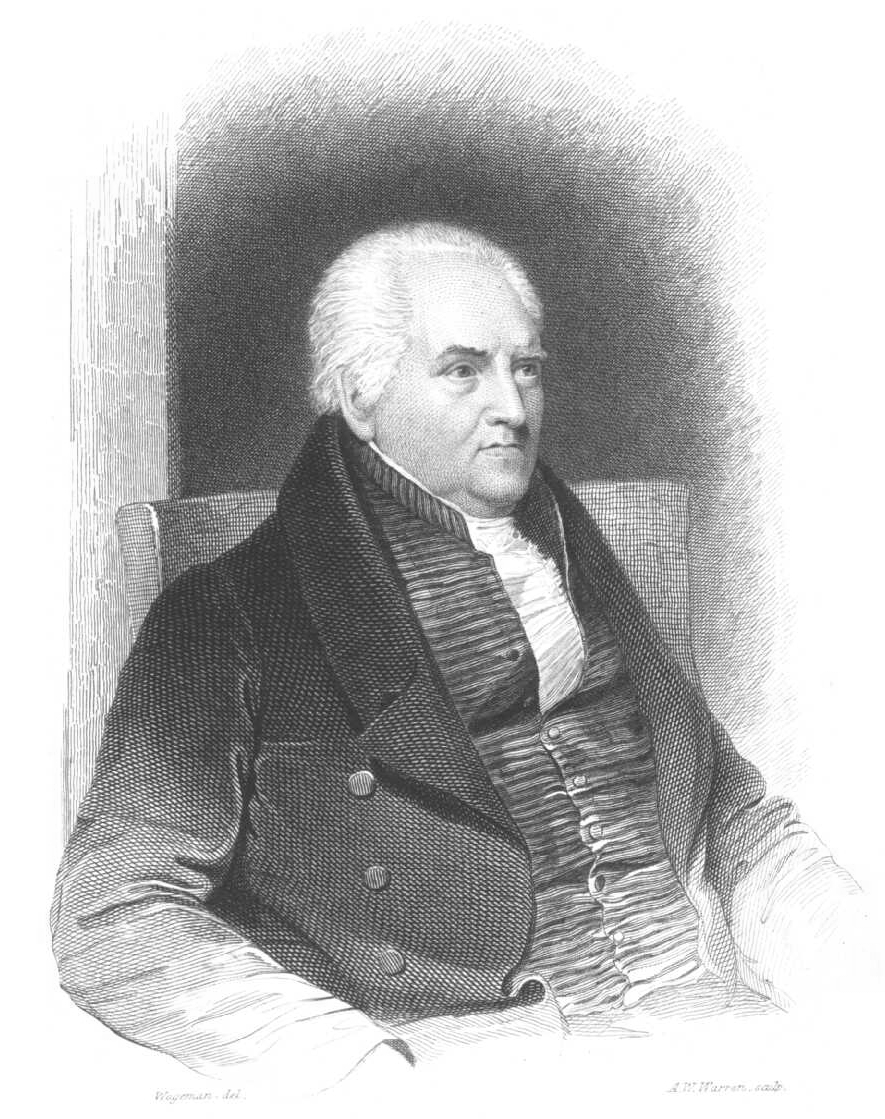
- Born: 26 May 1761; Stourbridge
- Died: 23 December 1825 (aged 64); London
- Citizenship: British
- Scientific career
- Fields: Chemistry

Samuel Parkes (1761–1825) was a British manufacturing chemist, now remembered for his Chemical Catechism.

== Life ==
He was born at Stourbridge, Worcestershire, on 26 May 1761. He was the eldest son of Samuel Parkes (died 1 April 1811, aged 76), a grocer, by his first wife, Hannah, daughter of William Mence of Stourbridge. He was at a dame's school in Stourbridge with Sarah Kemble, and in 1771 went to a boarding-school at Market Harborough, Leicestershire, under Stephen Addington.

Parkes began his career in his father's business. In 1790 he was one of the founders, and for some years president, of a public library at Stourbridge. Around 1793 he moved to Stoke-on-Trent, Staffordshire. A Unitarian, he conducted public worship in his own house at Stoke. In 1803 he settled in Goswell Street, London, as a manufacturing chemist.

He joined Sir Thomas Bernard in agitating (1817) against salt duties, which were repealed in 1825. In 1820 he was prominent, as a chemical expert, in a notable case between Messrs. Severn, King, & Co. and some insurance offices. He was a numismatist, and made a collection of Greek and Roman coins; he was a collector also of prints and autographs, and brought together a set of the works of Joseph Priestley. He was elected a member of the American Philosophical Society in 1822 and a Foreign Honorary Member of the American Academy of Arts and Sciences in 1823.

Parkes was a member of 21 learned societies, British and foreign. During a visit to Edinburgh, in June 1825, he went down a painful disorder, which proved fatal. He died at his residence in Mecklenburgh Square, London, on 23 December 1825, and was buried in the graveyard of the New Gravel Pit Chapel, Hackney. His funeral sermon was preached by William Johnson Fox.

His portrait, from a drawing by Abraham Wivell, and engraved by Ambrose William Warren, was prefixed to the twelfth and thirteenth editions of the Chemical Catechism.

== Works ==
The first editions of Parkes's manuals of chemistry were issued between 1806 and 1815, and brought him a reputation, and honours from learned societies. The Chemical Catechism was written for the education of his daughter, and lent in manuscript to others. After it was translated into Russian, the Emperor of Russia sent him a valuable ring. In 1817 the Highland Society voted him a silver inkstand for an essay on kelp and barilla. He received a silver cup from the Horticultural Society of Scotland for a paper on the uses of salt in gardening.

Parkes published:

- A Chemical Catechism, &c., 1806; 12th edit. 1826, edited, with memoir, by J. W. Hodgetts; 13th edit. 1834, revised by Edward William Brayley the younger. There was a pirated edition, with title A Grammar of Chemistry, 1809, bearing the name of David Blair. The sale was stopped by an injunction in chancery. There were many further American editions distinct from the above; and it was translated into French, German, Spanish, and Russian.
- Rudiments of Chemistry, 1809, an abridgment of the Catechism; 4th edit. 1825.
- Chemical Essays, 1815, 5 vols.; 3rd edit. 1830, edited by Hodgetts.
- Thoughts on the Laws relating to Salt, 1817.
- Letter to Farmers and Graziers on the Use of Salt in Agriculture, 1819.

Parkes wrote papers On Nitric Acid (Philosophical Magazine, 1815), Reply to Dr. Henry ... respecting ... Bleaching by Oxymuriatic Acid (Thomson's Annals of Philosophy, 1816), and On the Analysis of some Roman Coins (Quarterly Journal of Science, 1826).

The Chemical Catechism includes poetical descriptions of chemical processes. Here is his description of plant respiration:

Thus while the vegetable tribes inhale
The limpid water from the parent vale,
Their veget
To blend it with the carbon of the soil,
And form bitumen, resin, wax, or oil:,
The free'd caloric bursts the expanding mass,
And swells the nascent oxygen to gas;
Which, from its inmost cells, each leaflet pours
In viral currents through its myriad pores,
To renovate the air, by tempests hurl'd
From pole to pole, around a freshen'd world.

== Family ==
Parkes married, on 23 September 1794, Sarah (born 25 February 1766; died 14 December 1813), eldest daughter of Samuel Twamley of Bromsgrove, Worcestershire. His only child, Sarah Mayo (born 28 May 1797; died 30 July 1887), was married, on 25 May 1824, to Joseph Wainwright Hodgetts, who lost his life at an explosion in a chemical works in Manchester, on 14 February 1851.

== Notes ==
Attribution

This article incorporates text from a publication now in the public domain: "Parkes, Samuel". Dictionary of National Biography. London: Smith, Elder & Co. 1885–1900.
