= World Biographical Information System Online =

The World Biographical Information System Online (or WBIS Online) is an online database that contains biographical articles from international lexica and encyclopedias in various languages.

Claiming to be "the most comprehensive biographical database available", WBIS Online is based on a bibliography of biographical sources published by K. G. Saur Verlag of Walter de Gruyter, each covering a continental region, countries or languages or cultural areas and available in digitalized microfiches. The use is free in Germany, people can use the database either in public libraries, where they are already registered as a user, or at home after proof of their residence in Germany, free of charge and unlimited.
