= William Tooke =

British clergyman and historian (1744–1820)

William Tooke (1744 – 17 November 1820) was a British clergyman and historian of Russia.

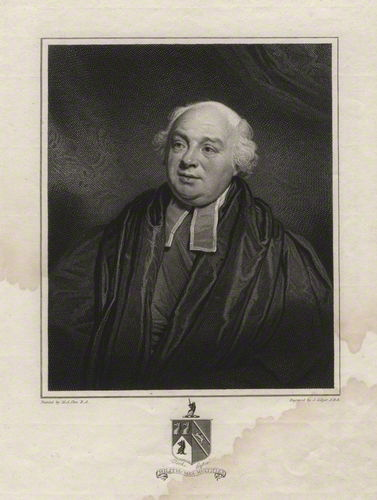
William Tooke, 1820 engraving by Joseph Collyer after Martin Archer Shee.

== Life ==
Tooke was the second son of Thomas Tooke (1705–1773) of St. John's, Clerkenwell, by his wife Hannah, only daughter of Thomas Mann of St. James's, Clerkenwell, whom he married in 1738. The family claimed connection with Sir Bryan Tuke and George Tooke.

William was educated at an academy at Islington kept by one John Shield. In 1771 Tooke obtained letters of ordination as deacon and priest from Richard Terrick as bishop of London; and received from John Duncombe the offer of the living of West Thurrock, Essex, in the same year. This he declined on being appointed chaplain to the English church at Kronstadt. Three years later, on the resignation of Dr. John Glen King, Tooke was invited by the English merchants at St. Petersburg to succeed him as chaplain there. In this position he made the acquaintance of many members of the Russian nobility and episcopate, and also of the numerous men of letters and scientists of all nationalities whom Catherine II summoned to her court. He was a regular attendant at the annual diner de tolérance which the empress gave to the clergy of all denominations, and at which Gabriel, the metropolitan of Russia, used to preside. Among those whose acquaintance Tooke made was the French sculptor Étienne Maurice Falconet, then engaged on his statue of Peter the Great.

On 5 June 1783 he was elected Fellow of the Royal Society, and on 14 May 1784 was admitted sizar of Jesus College, Cambridge, but neither resided nor graduated. Shortly afterwards he became a corresponding member of the Imperial Academy of Sciences at St. Petersburg and of the Free Economical Society of St. Petersburg. While chaplain at St. Petersburg Tooke made frequent visits to Poland and Germany, some details of which are printed from his letters in John Nichols's Literary Anecdotes. At Königsberg he made the acquaintance of Immanuel Kant.

In 1792 Tooke was left a fortune by a maternal uncle, returned to England, and devoted himself to writing. In 1814 Tooke served as chaplain to the lord mayor of London, Sir William Domville, and preached in that capacity several sermons, which were published separately.

Tooke resided during his latter years in Great Ormond Street, Bloomsbury, but moved to Guilford Street just before his death, which took place on 17 November 1820. He was buried on the 23rd in St. Pancras new burial-ground. An engraving by J. Collyer, after a portrait by Martin Archer Shee, is prefixed to his Lucian.

== Works ==
Tooke early turned his attention to literature, and in 1767 published an edition of John Weever's Funeral Monuments. In 1769 he issued in two volumes The Loves of Othniel and Achsah, translated from the Chaldee. The "translation" was merely a blind, and Tooke's object appears to have been to give an account of Chaldean philosophy and religion; he evinces an acquaintance with Hebrew. This was followed in 1772 by an edition of Mary Magdalen's Funeral Tears by Robert Southwell. In 1777 he published Pieces written by Mons. Falconet and Mons. Diderot, on Sculpture in General, and Particularly on the Celebrated Statue of Peter the Great, ... translated from the French by William Tooke, with several additions (London: W. Bowyer and J. Nichols).

His residence at St. Petersburg had given him chances for the study of Russian history, and he now set to work to publish the results of his researches. He had already translated from German Russia, or a compleat Historical Account of all the Nations which compose that Empire (London, 4 vols. 1780–1783). In 1798 appeared The Life of Catharine II, Empress of Russia; an enlarged translation from the French (3 vols), more than half of which consisted of Tooke's additions. It was followed in 1799 by A View of the Russian Empire during the Reign of Catharine II and to the close of the present Century (3 vols); a second edition appeared in 1800, and was translated into French in six volumes (Paris, 1801). In 1800 Tooke published a History of Russia from the Foundation of the Monarchy by Rurik to the Accession of Catharine the Second (London, 2 vols).

In 1795 he produced two volumes of Varieties of Literature, followed in 1798 by the similar Selections from Foreign Literary Journals. He was principal editor, assisted by William Beloe and Robert Nares, of the New and General Biographical Dictionary, published in fifteen volumes in 1798; and in the same year he wrote Observations on the Expedition of General Bonaparte to the East A few years later he began a translation in ten volumes of the sermons of the Swiss divine Georg Joachim Zollikofer. The first two appeared in 1804 (2nd edit. 1807), two in 1806, two in 1807, and two in 1812; they were followed in 1815 by a translation of the same divine's Devotional Exercises and Prayers.

He contributed largely to the Monthly Review and the Gentleman's Magazine, and is credited with the authorship of the memoir of Sir Hans Sloane, written in French, and extant (British Library Add MS 30066 (Cat. Addit. MSS. 1882, p. 30)). His last work was Lucian of Samosata, from the Greek, with the Comments and Illustrations of Wieland and others, London, 1820, 2 vols.

For Rees's Cyclopædia he contributed articles on geography (perhaps of Russia) but the details are not known.

== Family ==
In 1771, Tooke married Elizabeth, daughter of Thomas Eyton of Llanganhafal, Denbighshire, and they had two sons, Thomas Tooke and William Tooke, and a daughter, Elizabeth.

== Attribution ==
- Pollard, Albert Frederick (1899). "Tooke, William (1744-1820)" . In Lee, Sidney (ed.). Dictionary of National Biography. Vol. 57. London: Smith, Elder & Co. "citing: An elaborate account of Tooke is given by his friend, John Nichols [q. v.], in his Literary Anecdotes, ix. 160–80. See also Tooke's Works in the British Museum Library; Gent. Mag. 1814 i. 257, 363, ii. 47, 563, 564, 1816 i. 433, 1820 ii. 466–8, 1839 ii. 605; Burke's Landed Gentry, 1894, ii. 2020."

== Works ==
- Tooke, William (1799), View of the Russian empire during the reign of Catharine the Second, and to the close of the present century, Volume 1, Piccadilly: T.N. Longman and O. Rees, Pater-Noster-Row, and J. Debrett

== Sources ==
- "Тук, Вильям" . Brockhaus and Efron Encyclopedic Dictionary (in Russian). 1906.
