= British Biographical Index =

British biographical dictionary published between 1601 and 1929

British Biographical Index is the key to the British Biographical Archive. It was edited by David Bank and Anthony Esposito, published by K.G. Saur in London in 1990.

The collection includes 330,000 biographical entries from 324 reference books originally published between 1601 and 1929. Most major reference libraries have it. In digital online form, it forms part of the World Biographical Information System Online.
