= Alexander Henderson (physician) =

Scottish physician and author

Alexander Henderson (1780 – 1863) was a Scottish medical doctor and writer.

== Biography ==
Born in Aberdeenshire, he was educated at the University of Edinburgh, where he graduated as a doctor of medicine in 1803. He went to London and was admitted a licentiate of the Royal College of Physicians in 1808. He chiefly devoted himself to letters, though, contributing to such works as Encyclopædia Britannica and Edinburgh Review. He translated Cabanis's Coup d'œil sur les révolutions et la réforme de la médicine (1804) as Sketch of the revolutions of medical science, and views relating to its reform (1806). He published The History of Ancient and Modern Wines in 1824.
