= Patrick Kelly (metrologist) =

British metrologist

Patrick Kelly (1756–1842) was a British metrologist, best known for his comparative studies of weights and measures collected in his works Universal Cambist (1811) and Oriental Metrology (1832). Kelly was Master of the Finsbury Square Academy, London. He was also instrumental in the establishment of the Imperial system of measurement through the Weights and Measures Act 1824 (5 Geo. 4. c. 74).

== Life ==
He was for many years master of a successful private school, the Mercantile School, in Finsbury Square, London. He was appointed mathematical examiner at Trinity House, and in 1813 had the degree of LL.D. conferred on him by the University of Glasgow. Charles Hutton's 1815 list of England's most notable private observatories included Kelly's observatory at Finsbury Square.

Kelly knew Nevil Maskelyne, John Herschel, James Hutton, and other men of science. He was consulted by committees of the House of Commons as an authority on questions of coinage and currency. He died at Brighton, 5 April 1842. A portrait of him by Harry Ashby was engraved by Thomas Woolnoth.

== Bibliography ==
- A Practical Introduction to Spherics and Nautical Astronomy; being an attempt to simplify those ... Sciences. Containing ... the discovery of a projection for clearing the lunar distances in order to find the Longitude at Sea; with a new method of calculating this ... problem. London, 1796. 8º. Reprinted 1813, 1822.
- Elements of Book-keeping, both by single and double entry, comprising a system of merchants accounts, etc. London, 1801. 8º. Reprinted 1802, 1811, 1815, 1821.
- The Universal Cambist, and commercial instructor; being a general treatise on exchange, including the monies, coins, weights and measures of all trading nations and colonies: with an account of their banks and paper currencies. 2 vol. London, 1811. 4º. Reprinted 1821. Second edition 1831, reprinted 1835.
- Metrology; or, an exposition of weights and measures, chiefly those of Great Britain and France, comprising tables of comparison, and views of various standards, etc. [With an appendix containing a general view of the Bill for establishing uniformity of weights and measures, etc.] London, 1816. 8º.
- A Dissertation on weights and measures, and the best means of revising them:, etc. London: Baldwin, Cradock, and Joy, 1817. 8º.
- Oriental Metrology; comprising the monies, weights, and measures of the East Indies, and other trading places in Asia, reduced to the English standard. ... To which is added an Appendix on Oriental measures of time. London, 1832. 8º.
- For Rees's Cyclopædia he wrote articles on:
- Coinage, Vol 8, 1807
- Exchanges, Vol 13, 1809
- Standard, Vol 33, 1816
- Weights, Vol 38, 1818
