= Charles Sylvester =

British chemist and inventor (1774–1828)

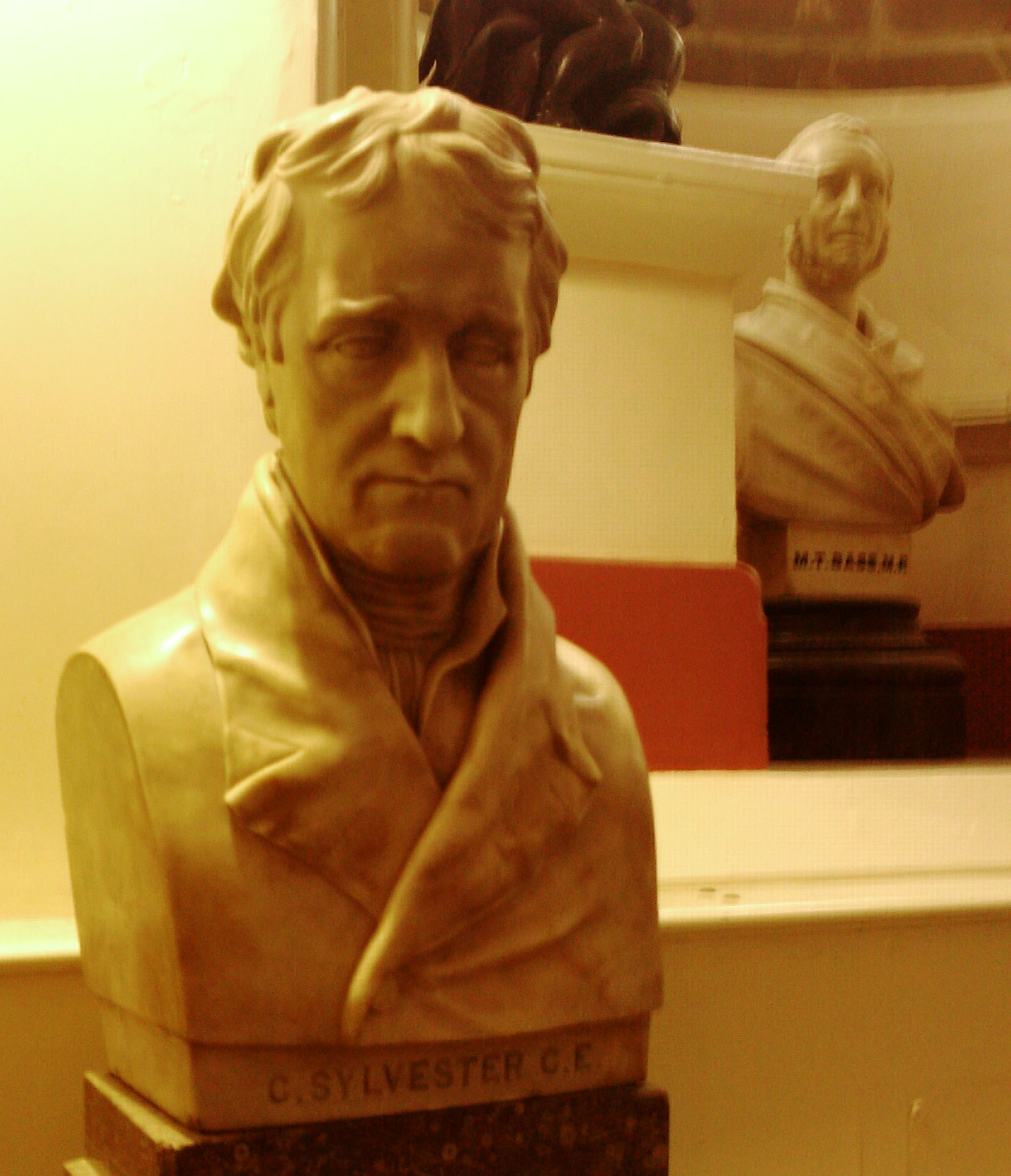
- Bust in Derby Museum by Francis Chantrey
- Born: 1774
- Died: 1828 (aged 53–54)
- Occupations: Chemist, Inventor

Charles Sylvester (1774–1828) was a chemist and inventor born in Sheffield, in the Kingdom of Great Britain. He worked on galvanization, public building heating and sanitation, and railroad friction amongst other things. A book, Industrial Man: The Life and Works of Charles Sylvester by Ian Inkster, Ph.D., of Nottingham University, and Maureen S. Bryson, B.S., published in 1999 is a comprehensive work covering his life, his extended family and pedigree, and his published works; including Poems on Various Subjects, 1797; The Epitome of Galvanism, 1804; Appendix of the Elementary Treatise on Chemistry, 1809; Philosophy of Domestic Economy, 1819; On a Method of expressing Chemical Compounds by Algebraic Characters, 1821; On the Motions produced by the Difference in the Specific Gravity of Bodies, 1822; Report on Rail-roads and Locomotive Engines, 1825; and On the best method of Warming and Ventilating Houses and other Buildings, 1829.

== Biography ==
Sylvester was christened 10 July 1774, in Sheffield, in the West Riding of Yorkshire. He was the son of Joseph Sylvester and Sarah Mills who had been married in nearby Rotherham on 5 March 1767. It was thought for a time that Charles Sylvester was part of the Sylvester family from Norton, Derbyshire. His links to the Sylvesters in Sheffield and Rotherham have been well documented. He married Sarah Dixon 13 August 1798, in Sheffield, three months before the birth of their son John. Sarah had two more boys and three girls, but John was the only boy to survive to adulthood.

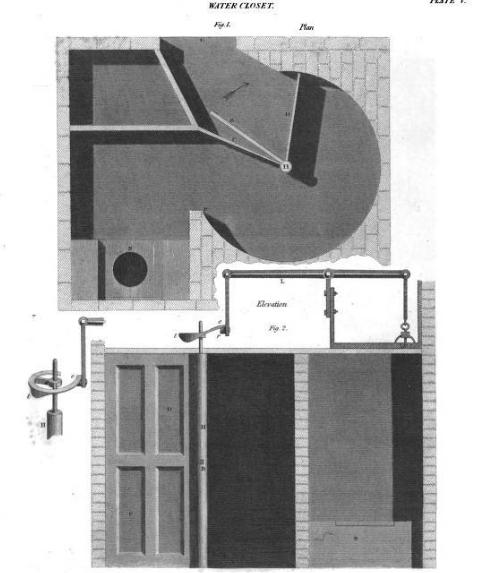
Toilet design

Sylvester experimented with coating iron and steel with zinc. The method patented by Sylvester and two others involved building a battery (galvanic cell) from the items that one wanted to plate with zinc, and then leaving the construction in seawater.

In 1807, Sylvester moved to Derby where he worked with William Strutt who was building Derby's Royal Infirmary. Sylvester was instrumental in documenting a novel heating system for the new hospital. He published his ideas in The Philosophy of Domestic Economy; as exemplified in the mode of Warming, Ventilating, Washing, Drying, & Cooking, . . . in the Derbyshire General Infirmary in 1819.

The book is dedicated to Strutt, and Sylvester is careful to assign many of the inventions to Strutt, and to note that the heating designs installed in the new infirmary had already been tried on Strutt and his friends' houses. Sylvester documented the new ways of heating hospitals that were included in the design, and the healthier features such as self-cleaning and air-refreshing toilets. The toilets had a carefully designed door that would exchange the air for fresh as each user exited. The same door action also washed the basin.

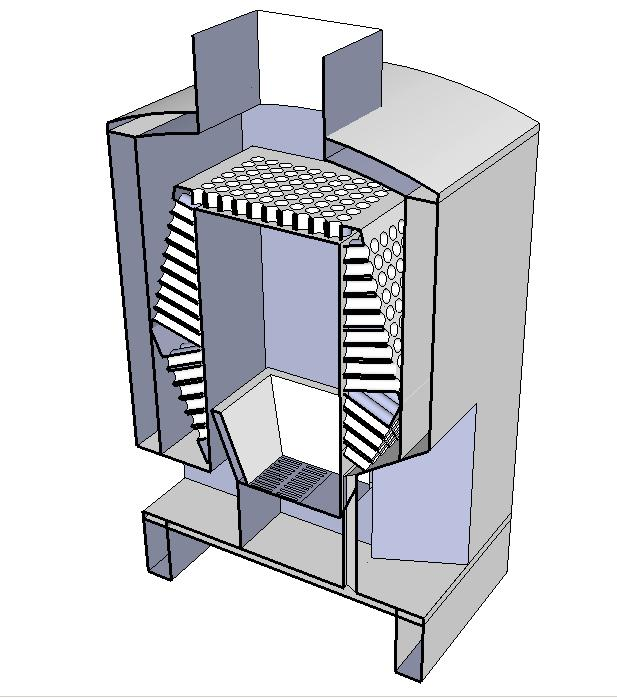
Warm air stove

Sylvester described the infirmary's features including its fireproof construction, laundry and novel heating that allowed the patients to breathe fresh heated air whilst old air was channeled up to a glass and iron dome at the centre. Sylvester described the advances that Strutt had made and this was successful in three ways. Sylvester was able to take the new ideas for heating and apply them in numerous other building projects. The Derby Infirmary was seen as a leader in European architecture and architects and visiting royalty were brought to see its features. Strutt was proposed to become a member of the Royal Society by five distinguished proposers who included Marc Isambard Brunel and James Watt.

Sylvester with Strutt was a member of Erasmus Darwin's Derby Philosophical Society. Sylvester was commissioned by the Chairman of the Liverpool and Manchester Railway to advise them on the subject of the railroad and he wrote a Report on rail-roads and locomotive engines. Sylvester included a comparison between canals and railways. He observed that greater power will deliver more speed on a railroad, but on the canal the power required to increase speed varies by the square of the velocity.
