= Kumbhariya, Surat district =

Kumbhariya is a village in Choryasi taluka of Surat district in the Gujarat state of India. The name bears resemblance to another village (Kumbharia) near Anjar in the Kutch district of Gujarat.

Kumbhariya, officially a village with its own Gram Panchayat, is slowly burgeoning into a well-developed township. Its entry is through the Surat - Kadodara Road. Its official distance is about 10 km from Surat and is well-connected with the city by way of auto-rickshaws. It has villages like Saroli, Puna Gam, Saniya Hemad in its vicinity. It is believed that the buzzing textile market of Surat is slowly expanding into its nearby villages, including Kumbhariya. This village is very well known for its large population of NRI's.
