= Rees's Cyclopædia =

19th-century British encyclopædia

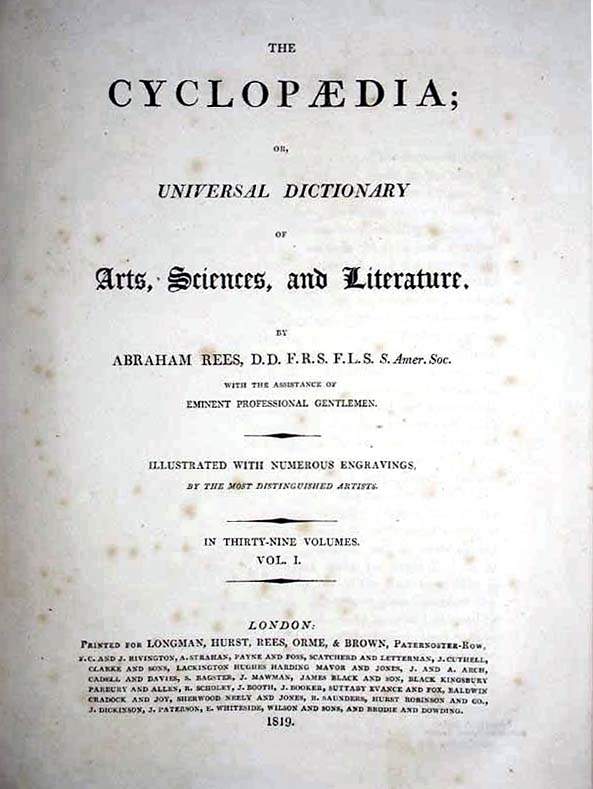
- Title page of first edition, 1819
- Editor: Abraham Rees
- Genre: Encyclopaedia
- Publisher: Longman, Hurst, Rees, Orme and Brown
- Publication date: 1802–1819
- Publication place: Great Britain

Rees's Cyclopædia, in full The Cyclopædia; or, Universal Dictionary of Arts, Sciences, and Literature, was a 19th-century British encyclopaedia edited by Rev. Abraham Rees (1743–1825), a Presbyterian minister and scholar who had edited previous editions of Chambers's Cyclopædia.

== Background ==
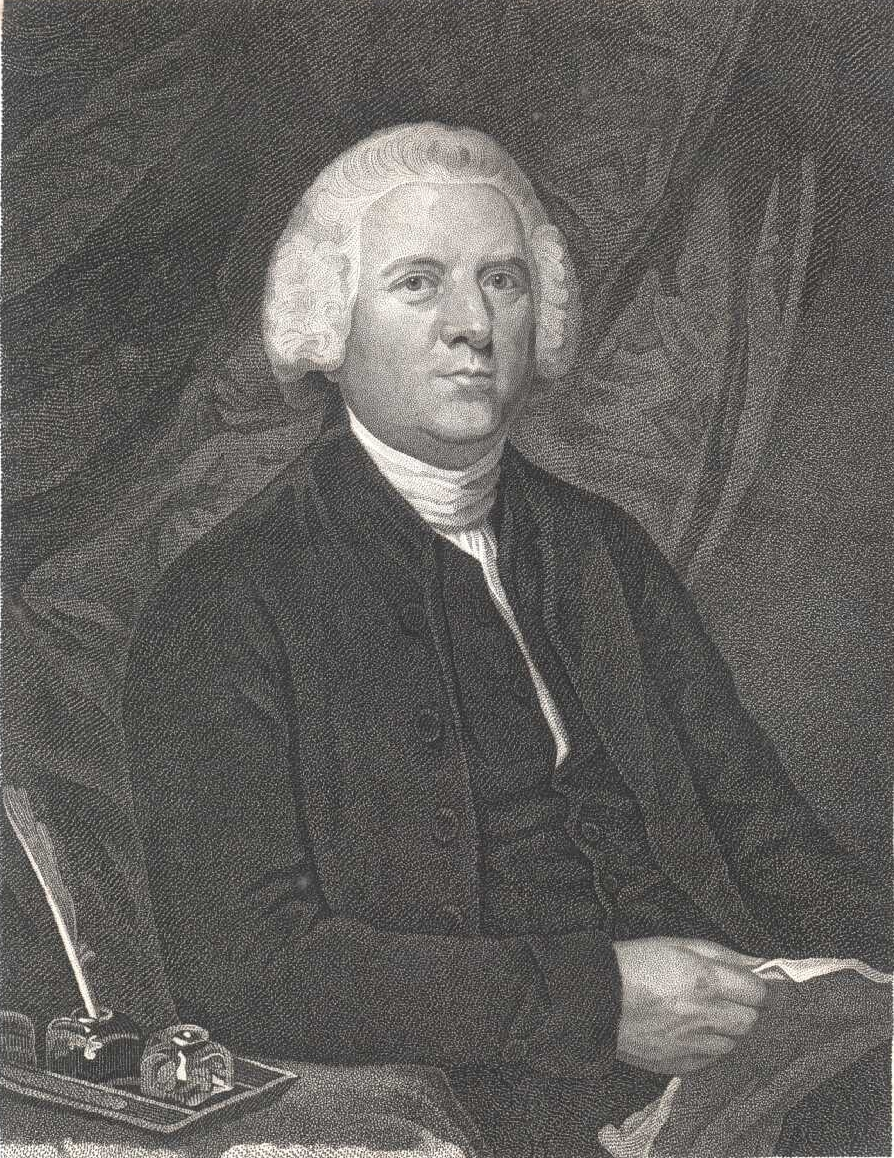
Abraham Rees (1743–1825), compiler of Rees's Cyclopædia.

When Rees was planning his Cyclopædia, Europe was in the aftermath of the French Revolution, and during serialised publication (1802–1820) the Napoleonic Wars and War of 1812 occurred. Britain absorbed into its empire a number of the former French and Dutch colonies around the world; Romanticism came to the fore; evangelical Christianity flourished with the efforts of William Wilberforce; and factory manufacture burgeoned.

With this background, philosophical radicalism was suspect in Britain, and aspects of the Cyclopædia were thought to be distinctly subversive and attracted the hostility of the Loyalist press. Contributors Jeremiah Joyce and Charles Sylvester had attracted the attention of the government and were tried for their views. The editor and authors went to great pains to emphasise their Englishness, to the extent of anglicising many French words: the French Kings Louis appear under the heading "Lewis".

Scientific theorising about the atomic system, geological succession, and earth origins; natural history (botany, entomology, ornithology and zoology); and developments in technology, particularly in textiles manufacture, are all reflected in the Cyclopædia. Other topics include exploration and foreign travel which provide insights into how the world was viewed at that time. Agriculture and rural life also feature greatly.

== Format ==
The Cyclopædia appeared serially between January 1802 and August 1820, and ran to 39 volumes of text and 6 volumes of plates including an atlas. It contains around 39 million words, and around 500 of the articles are of monograph length. The sheets were produced weekly, and issued as half-volume sets several times a year. The dates of these can be seen on table 4.1 below. Only one set of the work in half-volumes (which also has some of the paper wrappers) is known to survive, in the library of the Natural History Museum, London.

=== Plates ===
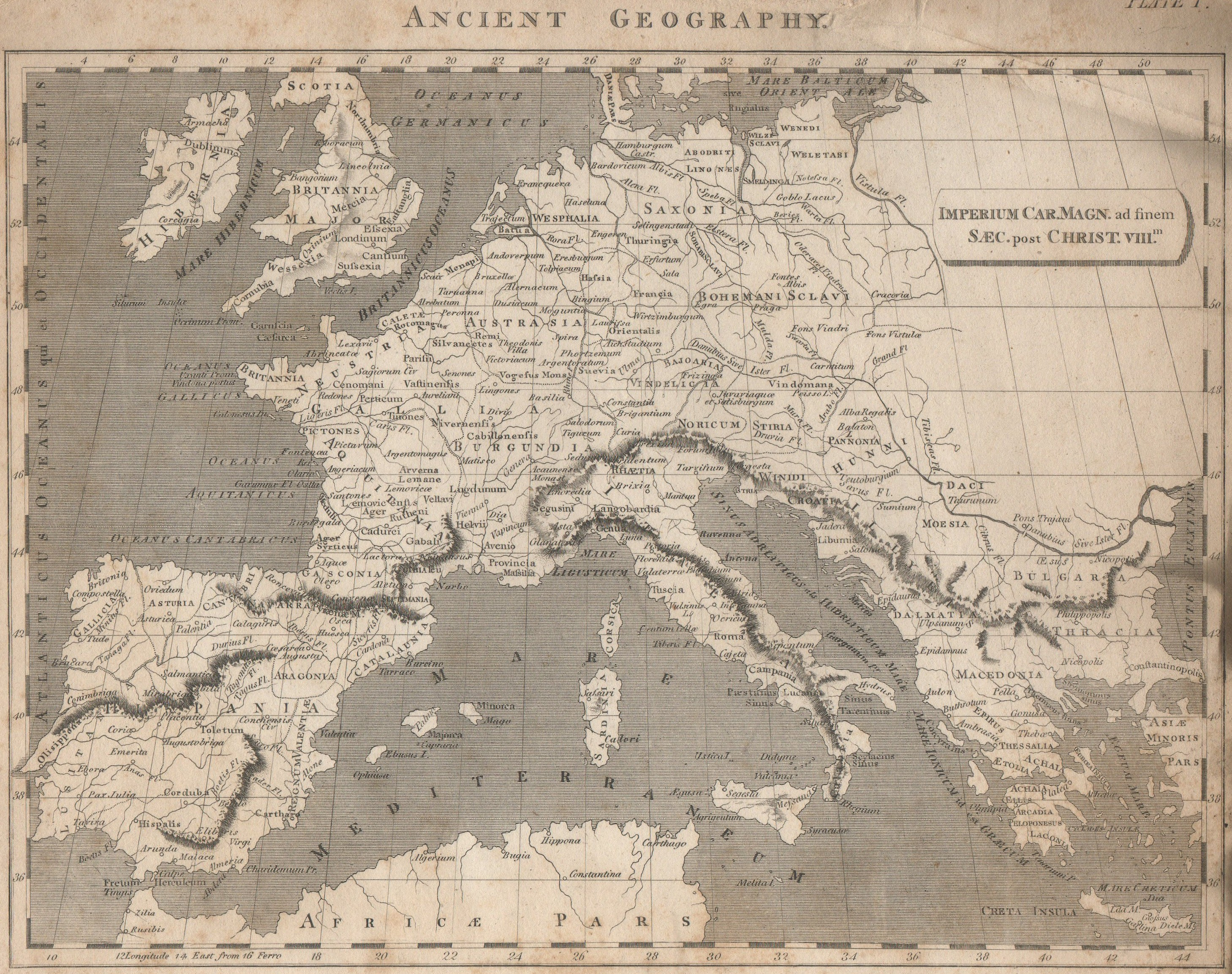
A plate from the atlas.

The plates were published in 6 volumes: four covering general articles, one on natural history, and one atlas. They were issued as blocks and so do not appear to have been issued with the texts in the half-volumes. There are 1107 plates, and atlas with 61 folded maps 16" by 10" in size. Bound at the back of Volume 39 are lists of all the plates and an index to them.

=== Later editions ===
The American edition was published by Samuel F. Bradford (see fr:Samuel F. Bradford), of Philadelphia. Bradford was a member of the famous family of American printers. The first volume appeared in May 1806 and the last in December 1820. The work extended to 41 volumes of text and 6 of plates. See section 5 below.

The growth of industrial archaeology led to the reprinting in the 1970s by the British publisher David and Charles of volumes covering manufacturing industry, naval architecture, and horology.

In the 1980s the Swiss publishing house IDC produced a microfiche edition.

== Background, reception, scholarship ==
The first decades of the 19th century saw many encyclopaediae published in Britain. Examples included:

- The fourth, fifth and sixth editions of Encyclopædia Britannica in 20 volumes, 1801–1810, 1815–1817, and 1823–1824.
- Encyclopædia Perthensis or Universal Dictionary of Arts, Science and Literature, 23 volumes, Edinburgh 1807.
- Edinburgh Encyclopædia, 18 volumes, 1808–1830, ed. David Brewster.
- British Encyclopedia, or Dictionary of Arts and Sciences, 6 volumes, 1809, ed. William Nicholson.
- Pantologia, 12 volumes, 1813, ed. John Mason Good, Olinthus Gregory, Newton Bosworth.
- Encyclopædia Metropolitana, 28 volumes, 1817–1845, edited initially by Samuel Taylor Coleridge
- Encyclopaedia Londinensis 24 volumes,1810–1828, including 3 volumes of plates, ed. John Wilkes

These sources commonly fed off each other, and writers often contributed to more than one.

The Cyclopædia had comparatively little reception on publication. The Anti-Jacobin Review published hostile reviews of half-volume 1 in 1802, and of volumes 2–4 in 1804-5. These reviews complained about its supposed antireligious aspects and radical standpoints attributed to its editor and contributors, and cited lack of article balance, confusing alphabetisation, and cross-references to then-unpublished volumes. The British Critic less stridently criticised lack of balance and confusion in volume 1. The Panoplist carried a serial review of both editions of Rees by Jedediah Morse in 1807–1810.

The Quarterly Review commented, "Rees is the most extensive cyclopædia in English with many excellent articles it has generally been condemned as on the whole too diffuse and too commonplace."

The exhaustive article on encyclopaediae in the Encyclopædia Britannica, 11th edition (1910) mentions Rees's involvement with the editing of the original Chambers, but ignores completely the later work. The 15th edition of Britannica mentions Rees's Cyclopædia superficially.

Rees's Cyclopædia seems to be in limbo in modern published studies of reference books. Superseded by more modern works and ignored by larger scholarship, the Cyclopædia received modern scholarly attention from students of the history of science and the history of technology, after research into the life and times of Charles Burney and his writings on music. In 1948 Percy Scholes published his biography The Great Dr Burney, 2 vol., and devoted a chapter to Burney's work for Rees. Scholes had his own copy of the work and used it profitably to discuss in some detail the faults of the work, in particular, the way the serial production caused major problems when editors were faced with new knowledge that appeared after the volume containing the appropriate section had been issued. They addressed this partially with an appendix in the last volume, and also by inventing contorted new subject titles in the main work ("Cotton Manufacture", Vol. 10, 1808, and "Manufacture of Cotton", Vol. 21, 1812). Later writers about Burney have investigated further his involvement with Rees. (See list of sources, below).

The Cyclopædia lacks a classified index volume, and alphabetising is on occasion eccentric ("York, New").

=== The Rees Project ===
The Rees Project was instigated by June Zimmerman Fullmer (1920–2000), a professor at Ohio State University, an authority on Humphry Davy and the chemistry of the early 19th century. Her work drew her to Rees and she indexed it. After tapping the invisible college of scholars who knew of Rees, she convened a summer 1986 meeting in London, following which she wrote a proposal to the American Foundation for the Humanities for funding to the project, setting out the object of producing a printed concordance to the contents of the Cyclopædia. This was intended to make Rees much more widely accessible to the modern reader. Funding was not forthcoming, and the matter lapsed.

== Printing ==
Rees's Cyclopædia was printed by Andrew Strahan, the King's Printer. It was entirely hand-set (there being no mechanical means of composition at this date) and printed. At the commencement of the work Strahan had nine wooden presses and over 20,000 kg of type. By 1809 this had risen to fifteen wooden presses and 36,000 kg (79,000 lb) of type. Since the Cyclopædia was produced serially, with a few sheets being printed each week, only a small part of Strahan's men and equipment would have ever been used on it at any one time. The work was printed on demy paper and folded to quarto format, with an uncropped size of 11 1/4 by 8 3/4 inches (290 by 220 mm). A limited number were advertised in the prospectus as being produced on royal paper, which when folded gave a format of 12 1/4 by 10 inches (310 by 250 mm). The paper is wove, with no chain lines. One watermark in the paper has been noted, with the legend W BALSTON, 1811. The supplier has not been identified, but it may be significant that a J. Dickinson was a member of the publishing syndicate.

The text matter was set in two columns measuring 221 mm × 80 mm (8.7 in × 3.1 in), with 67 lines per column. Ten lines of text measures 33 mm (1.3 in) deep. According to McKerrow's formula this size of typeface was Long Primer. The typefounder is unknown, but the article on "Printing" in Volume 28 had, bound with the text, specimens of type cast by Fry and Steele of London and Alexander Wilson of Glasgow. Greek and Hebrew faces were sometimes used and occasionally special chemical, pharmaceutical, and other symbols appear.

The work followed the common practice of the time of conflating the entries for I and J and U and V into single lists.

At first a half-volume cost 18 shillings, and a large paper version with proof copies of the plates cost £1 16 shillings (according to the prospectuses). By 1820 the parts sold for £1 and £1 16 respectively. It is not clear if these prices were for the parts in wrappers. At the end of the project the work sold for £85 in the quarto edition and was reputed to have cost Longmans nearly £300,000. Most sets of Rees today are bound in calf, with two parts to the volume, but the quality of the leather used has meant that in many cases the hinges have rotted and the covers loosened, necessitating rebinding.

The publication of Rees followed the common system of a number of booksellers banding together to share the cost and eventual profit: the conger (syndicate). The syndicate comprised Longman, Hurst, Rees, Orme, & Brown, Paternoster Row; F. C. and J. Rivington, publisher to the SPCK (publishers of the British Critic); A. Strahan, King's Printer; and 24 smaller concerns. The full list is on the work's title page.

No records of the publication survive, since the papers of Longmans were destroyed when their premises in Paternoster Row, London, were burnt out in the Blitz on the night of 29–30 December 1940.

=== Publication dates ===
VOLUME	PART	DATE OF PUBLICATION	LAST ARTICLE
1	1	1 January 1802	AGOGE
	2	14 May 1802	AMARANTHOIDES
2	3	18 October 1802	first part of ANTIMONY
	4	7 April 1803	ARTERIOTOMY
3	5	22 September 1803	first part of BABEL-MANDEB
	6	17 March 1804	BATTERSEA
4	7	17 August 1804	BIÖRNSTAHL
	8	13 April 1805	BOOK-BINDING
5	9	1 June 1805	Pt. BRUNIA
	10	26 December 1805	CALVART
6	11	18 February 1806	first part of CAPE OF GOOD HOPE
	12	17 June 1806	CASTRA
7	13	1 October 1806	first part of CHALK
	14	9 February 1807	CHRONOLOGY
8	15	18 May 1807	first part of CLAVARIA
	16	10 August 1807	COLLISEUM
9	17	27 November 1807	first part of CONGREGATION
	18	8 March 1808	CORNE
10	19	2 May 1808	first part of CROISADE
	20	2 July 1808	CZYRCASSY
11	21	23 September 1808	first part of DELUGE
	22	3 December 1808	DISSIMILITUDE
12	23	14 February 1809	first part of DYNAMICS
	24	22 May 1809	ELOANX
13	25	18 August 1809	first part of EQUATION
	26	25 November 1809	EXTREMUM
14	27	3 February 1810	FIBRO-CARTILAGE
	28	13 April 1810	FOOD
15	29	27 June 1810	first part of FROBERGER
	30	8 October 1810	GENERATION
16	31	29 November 1810	GNEISS
	32	25 January 1811	GRETNA GREEN
17	33	8 March 1811	HATFIELD REGIS
	34	22 April 1811	HIBE
18	35	23 June 1811	HUYSUM
	36	20 August 1811	INCREMENT
19	37	14 September 1811	first part of JOSEPHUS
	38	16 December 1811	KILMES
20	39	27 January 1812	first part of LAUREMBERG
	40	19 March 1812	LIGHT-HORSE
21	41	12 May 1812	first part of LONGITUDE
	42	27 July 1812	first part of MACHINERY + A. of PLATES
22	43	27 August 1812	first part of MANGANESE
	44	4 November 1812	MATTHESON
23	45	11 December 1812	METALS
	46	9 February 1813	MONSOON
24	47	30 March 1813	first part of MUSCLE
	48	26 April 1813	NEWTON
25	49	15 July 1813	first part of OLEINÆ
	50	15 September 1813	OZUNICZE + B. of PLATES
26	51	27 November 1813	first part of PASSIFLORA
	52	18 January 1814	PERTURBATION
27	53	22 March 1814	first part of PICUS
	54	7 May 1814	POETICS
28	55	14 July 1814	first part of PREACHING
	56	16 September 1814	PUNJGOOR
29	57	14 December 1814	first part of RAMISTS + C. of PLATES
	58	26 January 1815	REPTON
30	59	21 March 1815	first part of ROCK
	60	1 June 1815	RZEMIEN
31	61	11 July 1815	first part of SARABANDA
	62	21 September 1815	SCOTIUM + D. of PLATES
32	63	22 December 1815	first part of SHAMMY
	64	28 February 1816	SINDY
33	65	17 May 1816	first part of SOUND
	66	27 July 1816	STARBOARD
34	67	26 October 1816	first part of STUART (JAMES)
	68	11 December 1816	SZYDLOW
35	69	19 March 1817	first part of TESTUDO
	70	1 May 1817	TOLERATION
36	71	13 August 1817	first part of TUMOURS
	72	24 October 1817	VERMELHO
37	73	20 December 1817	first part of UNION
	74	23 March 1818	WATERLOO
38	75	29 May 1818	first part of WHITBY
	76	30 July 1818	WZETIN
39	77	30 December 1818	ZYTOMIERS; & first part of BALDWIN of Addendum + E. of PLATES
	78	27 October 1819	ZOLLIKIFER of Addendum + F. of PLATES
	79	29 July 1820	PLATES, THEIR REFERENCES AND TITLES

== Content ==
Coincident with the appearance of volume 39, all 39 volumes, A through Z, were published as a set in 1819. The primary publishers of this set were the consortium of Longman, Hurst, Rees (who by then apparently held an equity share), Orme, and Brown, of Paternoster Row.

However, correct dating by half-volume or fascicle (1802–1820) can have serious implications for the accuracy of citations by modern writers, especially when discussing scientific priority: a list compiled in 1820 in Philosophical Magazine was designed to give proper priority to scientific discoveries. Volumes of plates were issued in blocks, and not with the texts to which they refer.

Botanical historian Benjamin Daydon Jackson, unaware of this list, attempted to compile a list based on contemporaneous advertisements in the trade press, on dates appearing on the plates (having assumed that the plates were issued at the same time as the accompanying texts), and some guesswork. He published his first list privately in 1877, he issued a corrected version in 1880, and a final version appeared in the Journal of Botany in 1896. Only 3 of Jackson's dates accord with the 1820 dates listed above.

=== Citation style ===
Hundreds of articles in Rees are very long, and the work is unpaginated, so page reference is not easy. The following convention was adopted by the Rees Project, and is based on the method described by R. B. McKerrow. Each gathering has 8 pages, and each page 2 columns. The reference is cited by volume or half-volume details with accurate date between 1802 and 1820, article title, and then the gathering's identifier, the page, and the column, separated by colons. The page containing the gathering identifier (e.g., "B") is page 1 in each gathering (e.g., page "B:1"). Page 3 in each gathering typically contains the gathering identifier plus the figure 2 and should be ignored (e.g., "B2" appears on page "B:3").

The account of the bell-crank steam engine may be referenced as "Farey, John Jr. (December 1816). "Steam Engine". In Rees, Abraham (ed.). Rees's Cyclopædia. Vol. 34. London: Andrew Strahan. O:5:2." ("O" is the 8-page gathering's identifier.)

The gatherings in a typical volume of Rees are identified as follows. In each sequence the letters J and W are omitted and one letter U or V used but not both together.

- 22 running from "B" to "Z"
- 23 running from "Aa" to "Zz"
- 23 running from "3A" to "3Z"
- 23 running from "4A" to "4Z"
- 23 running from "5A" to "5Z" or as far as needed

The David and Charles reprint of some of the manufacturing articles is paged, and many writers cite this pagination, which is useless for consulting the original article from a full set. These reprints are also not comprehensive, as they omit short pieces under about 350 words.

=== References in Rees's Cyclopaedia articles ===
The long encyclopaedic articles in Rees commonly have a note at the end of the articles to the sources used in writing them. In other articles source references are run into the text. These are normally in a short-title form that will need decoding. Frequently these are in the format of surname of the author and a one or two word abbreviation of the book title. Collected works are similarly treated.

Thus, a small example covering biography:

- Bayle = Pierre Bayle, Dictionnaire Historique et Critique 1697
- Biog. Brit. = William Oldys, Biographia Britannica, 6 vol, 1774-1766
- Gen. Biog. = John Aikin et al. General biography or lives, critical and historical, of the most eminent persons of all ages, countries, conditions, and professions, arranged according to alphabetical order., 10 vol, 1799–1815
- Gen. Dict. = Thomas Birch, General Dictionary...[of biography], 10 vol, 1734–41
- Eloy, Dict. Hist. = Nicholas Francis Joseph Eloy, Dictionnaire Historique de la Medicine Ancienne at Moderne, 4 vol, 1778
- Haller, Bib. Bot. = Albrecht von Haller, Bibliotheca Botanica, 2 vol, 1771
- Haller, Bib. Chir. = Albrecht von Haller, Bibliotheca Chirurgica, 2 vol, 1774
- Haller, Bib. Anat. = Albrecht von Haller, Bibliotheca Anatomica, 2 vol, 1774
- Haller, Bib. Med. Pract. = Albrecht von Haller, Bibliotheca Medicinae Practicae, 4 vol, 1776–88
- Laborde = Jean-Benjamin François de la Borde, Essai sur la musique ancienne et moderne 4 vol, 1780
- Moreri = Louis Moréri, Le grand Dictionaire historique, ou le mélange curieux de l'histoire sacrée et profane 1674. The encyclopaedia focused particularly on historical and biographical articles. It was translated into English, German, Italian, Dutch and Spanish. A total of at least 20 different editions were published between 1674 (one volume) and 1759 (10 volumes).

Other sources cited include the Philosophical Transactions of the Royal Society and similar scientific publications, commentaries relating to biblical scholarship and accounts of travels.

=== Notable articles ===
Approximately 500 articles exceed 15 columns (11,000 words). The longest article is "Canal", by John Farey, Sr., 289 columns (210,000 words). John Landseer wrote 4 articles on schools of European engraving totalling over 600 columns (460,000 words).

=== Biographical articles ===
Rees's Cyclopaedia has 3789 biographical articles half a page (350 words) and longer, as well as numerous briefer ones. They range in time from Antiquity to the eighteenth century. Benjamin Heath Malkin, and Thomas Rees are noted as having written biographical articles, but there is no information about which. The rest of the authors cannot be positively identified except for William Tooke, who wrote about Catherine the Great. Many of the biographical articles are sourced to the biographical reference books noted in 3.3 above. In most cases Christian names are Anglicised – John for Johannes, for example.

=== The music articles ===
These were written by Charles Burney (1726–1814), with additional material by John Farey, sr (1766–1826), and John Farey, Jr (1791–1851), and illustrated by 53 plates as well a numerous examples of music typset within the articles. Charles Burney was well known as the author of A General History of Music, 4 vol 1776–1789 and two travel diaries recording his Musical Tours collecting information in France and Italy, and later Germany, 1+2 vol, 1771 and 1773, as well as the Commoration of Handel, 1785 and his Musical Memoirs of Metastasio, 1796. John Farey, sr was a polymath, well known today for his work as a geologist and for his investigations of mathematics. He was greatly interested in the mathematics of sound, and the schemes of temperamant used in tuning musical instruments then, and published much about it in contemporary periodicals. His son, John Farey, jr, was also polymathic in his interests. He contributed numerous drawings for the illustrations of mostly technological and scientific topics in Rees, and would have written the descriptions of them. They are always linked by key-letters to the details of the drawings. The procedure would have been for Farey to make the drawing first, after usually inspecting and measuring the object, then write the description of it, with the key letters, which were then engraved on the plate for final printing. The plates for dramatic machinery, the organ and barrel organ are by him.

== Contributors ==
The Cyclopædia was written by about 100 contributors, most of whom were Nonconformists. They were specialists in their fields, covering science, technology, medicine, manufacturing, agriculture, banking and transportation, as well as the arts and humanities. A number were members of the teaching staffs of the Royal Military Academy, and the Addiscombe Military Seminary of the East India Company. Other contributors were working journalists who wrote for scientific, medical and technical periodicals. Several of the contributors were active in radical politics; one was gaoled for sedition and another indicted for treason.

Amongst the eminent writers engaged by Rees were Lant Carpenter (1780–1870) on education, mental and moral philosophy; Tiberius Cavallo (1799–1809) on electricity and magnetism; John Flaxman (1755–1826) on sculpture; Luke Howard (1772–1867) on meteorology; John Landseer (1769–1852) on engraving; Sir William Lawrence, (1783–1867) on human and comparative anatomy; Sir James Edward Smith (1759–1828) on botany; David Mushet on metallurgy and chemistry; Rev. William Pearson (1767–1847) on astronomy; Sir Thomas Phillips (1770–1875) on painting.

Among the artists and engravers employed were Aaron Arrowsmith (1750–1823) who engraved the maps; William Blake (1757–1827) who made engravings to illustrate some of the sculpture articles; Thomas Milton (1743–1827) who engraved most of the natural history plates; Wilson Lowry (1762–1824) who engraved numerous of the plates especially those relating to architecture, machinery and scientific instruments.

Except for some of the botanical articles by Sir James Edward Smith, none of the articles are signed. Names were recorded in the Prospectus of 1802, the introduction at the start of the first volume, the paper covers of the unbound parts which have survived, and in a paper in the Philosophical Magazine, published in 1820. The alphabetical List of contributors to Rees's Cyclopædia has been compiled from the foregoing sources. The majority appear in the Dictionary of National Biography, and in sources listed in the British Biographical Index, but these accounts rarely record an involvement with the Cyclopædia.

== American edition ==
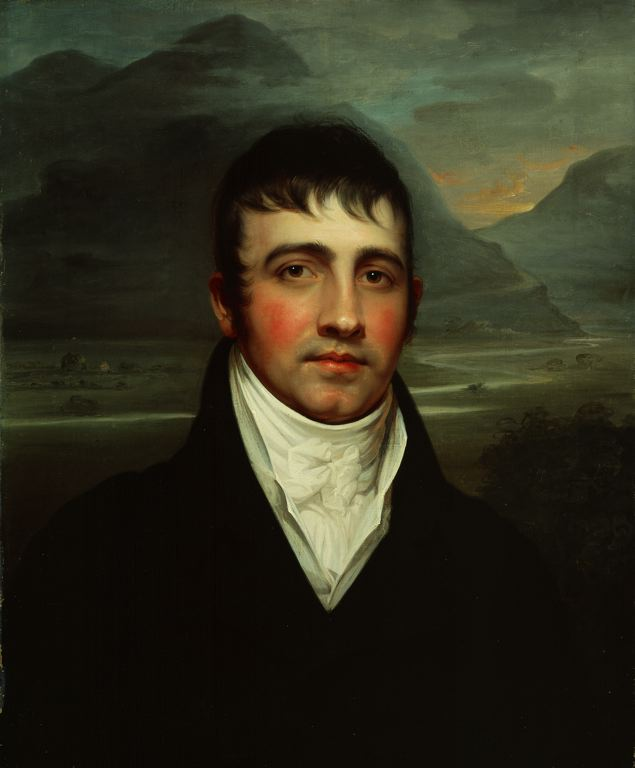
Samuel Fisher Bradford. Publisher of the American edition of Rees's Cyclopædia. Original in the Art Institute of Chicago.

The American edition was published by Samuel F. Bradford of Philadelphia. Bradford was a member of the famous family of American printers. The first volume appeared in May 1806, and the last in December 1820. The work extended to 41 volumes of text and six plates. There were 1,851 subscribers recorded. The initial print run was set at 2,500 copies, but financial problems beset Bradford, and the project passed to Murray, Draper, Fairman, and Company who reduced the run to 2,000 copies. The work sold at $4 per half volume or $8 per full volume. The fully bound set cost $400 in 1820.

The religious content of the first volumes was re-written to reflect American sensibilities by Bishop William White, an Episcopalian, and Ashbel Green a Presbyterian. Additional American material was incorporated into the text.

== Chronological list of sources ==
- Anon, Dr Rees's New Cyclopædia – On Saturday, 2 January 1802, will be published..., 3 page printed prospectus, 1801
- Anon, Dr Rees's New Cyclopædia – Samuel F. Bradford is preparing to publish by subscription .... 1 page broadside prospectus of the American edition, n. d. [c.1805]
- Anon., Review of Vol 1 in the Annual Review and History of Literature, vol 1, 1802, pp 859–66
- Anon., Review of Vol 1 in the Anti-Jacobin Review, vol 12, 1802, pp 178–90 and vol 13, 1802, pp 40–53
- Anon., Review of Vols 2, 3 and 4 in the Anti-Jacobin Review, vol 19, 1804, pp 365–376 and vol 20, 1805, pp 44–55
- Anon., Review of Vol 1 in the British Critic, vol 25/26, 1805, pp 225–244 and vol 27/28, 1806, pp 64–77
- Morse, Jedediah, comparative reviews of both editions in The Panoplist, Vol 3, 1807, pp 129–134, 178–183, 270–274, 507–511, Vol 4 (N.S. vol 1) 1808-9, pp 131–138, 177–183, 214–217, 273–274, 318–324, 368–371, 407–413, 514–518, Vol 5, (N.S. Vol 2) 1809–10, pp 29–34, 81–85, 123–127.
- Anon., Review in Eclectic Review, vol 5, 1809, pp 551–552
- Anon., Review in Ackermann's Repository, vol 2, 1816, p 307
- Anon., Review in Gentleman's magazine, vol 84, pt 1, 1816, pp 539–40
- Anonymous (September 1820). "Notices respecting New Books: The Cyclopædia ..." Philosophical Magazine. 1st series. 56 (269): 218–224. doi:10.1080/14786442008652396.
- Anon, Notice of the completion of the publication of the work, Monthly Repository, 1820, vol 15, p 624
- Jackson, Benjamin Daydon (1896). "Cyclopædia '". Journal of Botany. 34: 307–311.
- Scholes, P. A., The Puritans and Early Music in England and New England, OUP, 1934 [Occasional references to Burney's articles in Rees]
- Scholes, P. A., The Oxford Companion to Music, 1938 (and later eds) [Frequent citations to Burney's Rees articles, and also some illustrations from the work.]
- Scholes, P. A., 'A New Enquiry into the Life and Work of Dr Burney', Proceedings of the Musical Association 67th Session, 1940–1941, pp 1–30. [pp 24–5 has section 'Burney an Encyclopaedist'.]
- Scholes, P. A., The Great Dr Burney, 1948, Vol 2, pp 184–201, chapter LVIII, "Virtues and vagaries of a septuagenarian encyclopædist" [Throughout his biography Scholes made reference to, and some times quoted from, Burney's articles in Rees.]
- Mackarness, E. D. 'Dr Burney, Biographer', The Contemporary Review, vol 189 (1956) pp 352–357. [A brief account of Burney's biographical writings, including those in Rees.]
- Scholes, P. A., Dr Burney's Musical Tours in Europe, 2 vol, OUP 1959, [Scholes makes a number of references to, and quotations from Burney's Rees articles]
- Oldman, C.B., 'Dr Burney and Mozart', Mozart Jahnbuch 1962/63. (1964), pp 73–81. [Includes extracts from Burney's Rees articles about Mozart.]
- Bentley, G. E. jr., & Nurmi, Martin K., A Blake Bibliography, Annotated lists of Works, Studies, and Blakeana, University of Minnesota Press, Minneapolis, 1964, pp 145–148. [Detailed discussion of the 7 plates that William Blake engraved for the Cyclopaedia.]
- Lonsdale, Roger, Dr Charles Burney: a Literary Biography, OUP 1965, pp 407–431, chapter X, "Burney and Rees's Cyclopædia"
- Ferguson, Eugene S. (1968). "'Cast Iron Aqueduct in Rees's Cyclopædia'". Technology and Culture. 9 (4): 597–600. doi:10.2307/3101903. JSTOR 3101903.
- Cossons, Neil, ed., Rees's Naval Architecture 1819–20, 1 vol, Publisher: David and Charles, 1970
- Cossons, Neil, ed., Rees's Clocks, Watches and Chronometers, 1 vol, Publisher: David and Charles, 1970
- Cossons, Neil, ed., Rees's Manufacturing Industry, 5 vol, Publisher: David & Charles, 1972
- Harte, N. B., 'Rees's Watches Chronometers and Naval Architecture : A Note', Maritime History III 1973, 92–5
- Harte, N. B., "On Rees's Cyclopædia as a source for the history of the textile industries in the early nineteen century," Textile History, 5, 1974, pp 119–127.
- Rowland, K. T., Eighteenth Century Inventions David & Charles, 1974 [Draws extensively from the Rees plates as illustrations]
- Pestana, Harold R., 'Rees's Cyclopædia (1802–1820) a sourcebook for the history of geology, Journal of the Society for the Bibliography of Natural History, (1979), 9, (3), 353–361.
- Lonsdale, Roger, 'Dr Burney's 'Dictionary of Music' ',Musicology Australia, vol. 5, no. 1, pp. 159–171, 1979 [An account of Burney's Rees articles, with criticism of Scholes's discussion of them.]
- Kassler, Jamie Croy, The Science of Music in Britain: A Catalogue of writings, Lectures and Inventions, 2 vol, Garland, 1979 [Both Burney and Farey sr. appear often in the Index. Rees's Cyclopaedia and music is discussed at pp 1200–1204.]
- Jeremy, David J., Transatlantic Industrial Revolution, Blackwells, 1981. [Makes use of the textile machinery illustrations and other information]
- Stafleu, F. A., and Cowen, R. S., Taxonomic Literature 2ed (1983), vol 4, pp 631–635 [Detailed account of the bibliographic make-up of the volumes and plates. Includes the information that a William Fitt Drake contributed material about botany He does not appear in any of the sources that make up the list of contributors above.]
- Mabberley, D. J., ' "Anemia", or, the Prevention of Later Homonyms' Taxon, vol 32, No 1 (Feb 1983) pp 79–87. [Has at pp 80–81 an account of Sir J. E. Smith and the Supplementary portion of Rees's Cyclopaedia. Concerns botanical articles.]
- Grant, Kerry S., Dr Burney as Critic and Historian of Music. UMI Research Press, Ann Arbor, Michigan, 1983.[Throughout this book Grant made reference to, and some times quoted from, Burney's articles in Rees.]
- F. A. S., [F. A. Stafleu], The Rees Cyclopaedia: The Cyclopaedia or, Universal Dictionary of Arts, Sciences and Literature, London, Longman, Hurst, Rees, 1802–1820 by A. Rees, Taxon Vol 35, No 2 (May, 1986) pp 452–453. [A review of the IDG microfilm publication of Rees. Makes the point the work had not been adequately studied from the standpoint of the history of science.]
- Klima, Slava, Bowers, Garry, and Grant, Kerry S., Memoirs of Dr Charles Burney, 1726–1769, University of Nebraska Press. Lincoln and London, 1988.[Throughout this book the authors made reference to, and frequently quoted from, Burney's articles in Rees.]
- Kafker, Frank A., Notable Encyclopedists of the Eighteenth Century: Successors of the Encyclopedie, Publisher: The Voltaire Foundation, 1994. [Contains some material about the American edition]
- Woolrich, A. P., "John Farey, Jr., technical author and draughtsman: his contribution to Rees's Cyclopædia". Industrial Archaeology Review, 20, (1998), 49–68 AIA Abstracts 1998
- Coad, JonathanThe Portsmouth Block Mills: Bentham, Brunel and the start of the Royal Navy's Industrial Revolution, English Heritage, 2005 [Material from Rees's Cyclopaedia was used to inform Chapter 6 'The Beginnings of Mass Production'. See Portsmouth Block Mills ]
- Jeremy, David J. and Darnell, Polly C., Visual Mechanic Knowledge: The workshop drawings of Isaac Ebeneezer Markham (1795–1825), New England Textile Mechanic, Pub. Memoirs of the American Philosophical Society, Vol 263, 2010, pp 335–344 [An extensive account of the textiles material in the two versions of the Cyclopædia].
- Macmillan, David M, 'Abraham Rees, The Cyclopædia ', 2015. [This is an important online resource discussing the quality of the digitised versions of the plates in the Cyclopaedia. It investigates the 50-odd plates illustrating the Horological articles, and is an ongoing project, so subject to revision.]
- Woolrich, A. P., Dr Burney and Rees's Cyclopaedia, Burney Letter, vol 23 no 1 Spring, 2017, pp 1, 2, 10-11 [This discusses Charles Burney's contribution to the Cyclopaedia on music. The Burney Letter is published by the Burney Society. ISSN 1703-9835.]
- Woolrich, A. P., Consolidated edition of the Music Biographies from Rees's Cyclopaedia, (1802-1819), Burney Letter, vol 23 no 2 Fall, 2017, pp 6–7. [This is an edited version of the fuller introduction to the biographies.]
- Woolrich, A. P., "The General music articles in Rees's Cyclopaedia by Dr Charles Burney, John Farey, Sr. & John Farey, Jr.", Burney Letter, Vol 25 No 2, Spring. 2019. pp 1, 6-7, 12.
