= Thomas Walker =

Thomas, Tommy or Tom Walker may refer to:

== Entertainment ==
- Thomas Walker (actor) (1698–1744), English actor and dramatist
- Thomas Walker (author) (1784–1836), English barrister, police magistrate and writer of a one-man periodical, The Original
- Thomas Bond Walker (1861–1933), Irish painter
- Tom Walker (singer) (born 1991), British singer-songwriter
- Tom Walker (Homeland), a character in the TV series Homeland
- Tom Walker, British actor and comedian known for his character Jonathan Pie, a fictional British news reporter
- Tom Walker (comedian), Australian comedian, mime and Twitch streamer

== Law ==
- Thomas Joseph Walker (1877–1945), Judge for the United States Customs Court
- Thomas Glynn Walker (1899–1993), United States federal judge
- Thomas Walker (attorney) (born 1964), U.S. attorney

== Politics ==
- Thomas Walker (died 1748) (1660s–1748), Member of Parliament for Plympton Erle, 1735–1741
- Thomas Walker (merchant) (1749–1817), English political radical in Manchester
- Thomas Eades Walker (1843–1899), British Member of Parliament for East Worcestershire, 1874–1880
- Thomas Gordon Walker (1849–1917), British Indian civil servant
- Thomas Walker (Australian politician) (1858–1932), member of two different state parliaments
- Thomas Walker (Canadian politician) (died 1812), Canadian lawyer and politician
- Thomas J. Walker (1927–1998), provincial MLA from Alberta, Canada
- Thomas Walker (American politician) (1850–1935), Alabama state legislator
- Albert Thomas Walker, Canadian politician from Ontario

== Sports ==
- Thomas Henry Sumpter Walker(1856–1936), English bicycle racing pioneer
- Tom Walker (cricketer) (1762–1831), English cricketer
- Thomas Walker (Yorkshire cricketer) (1854–1925), English cricketer
- Tom Walker (1900s pitcher) (1881–1944), baseball player
- Tom Walker (1970s pitcher) (1948–2023), American baseball player
- Tommy Walker (footballer, born 1915) (1915–1993), Scottish footballer and manager
- Tom Walker (footballer) (born 1995), English footballer

== Other ==
- Thomas Walker (academic) (died 1665), English academic at Oxford University
- Thomas Walker (explorer) (1715–1794), American explorer
- Thomas Walker (slave trader) (1758–1797), British slave trader
- Thomas Walker (died 1805), Irish publisher of Walker's Hibernian Magazine
- Thomas Walker (philanthropist) (1804–1886), Australian politician and banker
- Thomas Larkins Walker (c.1811–1860), Scottish architect
- Thomas Walker (journalist) (1822–1898), English editor of The Daily News
- Thomas A. Walker (1828–1889), English civil engineering contractor
- T. B. Walker (1840–1928), Minneapolis businessman who founded the Walker Art Center
- Thomas William Walker (1916–2010), soil scientist
- Thomas Walker (naval officer) (1919–2003), United States Navy officer
- Thomas B. Walker Jr. (1923–2016), American investment banker, corporate director and philanthropist
- Tom Walker (priest) (1933–2016), Anglican priest and author
- Thomas Walker (musicologist) (1936–1995), American professor of music at Princeton University
- Thomas J. Walker, namesake of the Thomas J. Walker House in Knoxville, Tennessee
- Thomas Walker & Son, manufacturers of nautical instruments, Birmingham, England

== See also ==
- Tommy Walker (disambiguation)
