= Felix Vaughan =

English barrister

Felix Vaughan (7 March 1766 – 22 April 1799) was an English barrister, known for his role as defence counsel in the treason trials of the 1790s.

== Early life ==
The son of Samuel Vaughan of Middlesex, a tradesman, he was baptised at Westminster St James on 20 March 1766, and educated at Harrow School and Stanmore, where he was briefly a pupil of Samuel Parr, who became a lifelong friend, as did Basil William Douglas, Lord Daer, a schoolfellow, son of Dunbar Douglas, 4th Earl of Selkirk. He was admitted to the Inner Temple in 1785. He entered Jesus College, Cambridge as a fellow-commoner in 1786, graduating B.A. in 1790 and M.A. in 1794.

Vaughan was in France and Geneva in 1790–1. He corresponded from the continent with John Richter and William Frend.

== Opponent of the Pitt clampdown ==
Back in England, Vaughan was part of the London radical milieu including James Losh; also one of the group dining with John Horne Tooke. He was called to the bar in 1792. In spring of that year he was involved in drafting the constitution of the London Corresponding Society (LCS). and consulted about with the Society for Constitutional Information. He became a dedicated LCS member, much involved in legal matters.

From early in 1793, judicial measures, some questionable procedurally and some seen to be over-severe, were used to repress reforming views. In July Vaughan successfully defended a Knutsford bookseller who had stocked works of Tom Paine. Advising James Watt junior, then abroad, Vaughan took the view that he was safe from prosecution. He was counsel, with John Gurney, for Thomas Briellat, convicted in December 1793 for using seditious language. In making the defence case, Vaughan emphasised the ubiquity of the Association for Preserving Liberty and Property.

In 1794 Vaughan visited Thomas Muir in his prison hulk, with Joseph Priestley. In February, with Gurney, he successfully defended Daniel Isaac Eaton on a sedition charge, for publishing an allegory by John Thelwall. The defence rested largely on freedom of the press, and the jury refused to find that Eaton had criminal intention.

Vaughan took part as junior counsel in the defence of the reformer Thomas Walker on trial in Lancaster for seditious conspiracy, with Thomas Erskine. The trial began in April 1794, and Walker was acquitted, with the main prosecution witness discredited.

Vaughan in May 1794 defended George Harley Vaughan, a schoolmaster who had circulated a handbill about the war and its effect on the poor, on a seditious libel charge in Leicester. He was present with John Frost when John Horne Tooke's house was searched after his arrest in May, and visited him in the Tower of London. Subsequently, however, he was examined by the Privy Council, where he fended off implications of misprison of treason. As a consequence he was denied access to Horne Tooke, for a period from June. He has been considered the author of the pamphlet Cursory Strictures of 2 October 1794 on the handling of the treason trials by Sir James Eyre LCJ, as has William Godwin. He was junior counsel also that month in the trial of Thomas Hardy, and for the trial of Horne Tooke in November. Pages were removed from the LCS minute book, and Vaughan has been considered likely to be the person who did that. Of the group of defendants charged with Hardy and Tooke, Jeremiah Joyce chose Vaughan as counsel, rather than the team of Erskine and Vicary Gibbs.

In January 1795 Vaughan was unsuccessful in the defence of James Montgomery at Doncaster Assizes. In 1797 he and Samuel Romilly defended John Gale Jones at Warwick Assizes; Jones was convicted but not sentenced.

Thomas Banks made a series of plaster busts of the radicals around Horne Tooke, and Vaughan was included.

== Death ==
Vaughan died at his chambers in Lincoln's Inn, aged 32 or 33. He left a legacy to Horne Tooke, and property to Thomas Walker. Samuel Parr composed a Latin inscription for him.
