= British Encyclopaedia, or Dictionary of Arts and Sciences =

1809 encyclopedia by William Nicholson

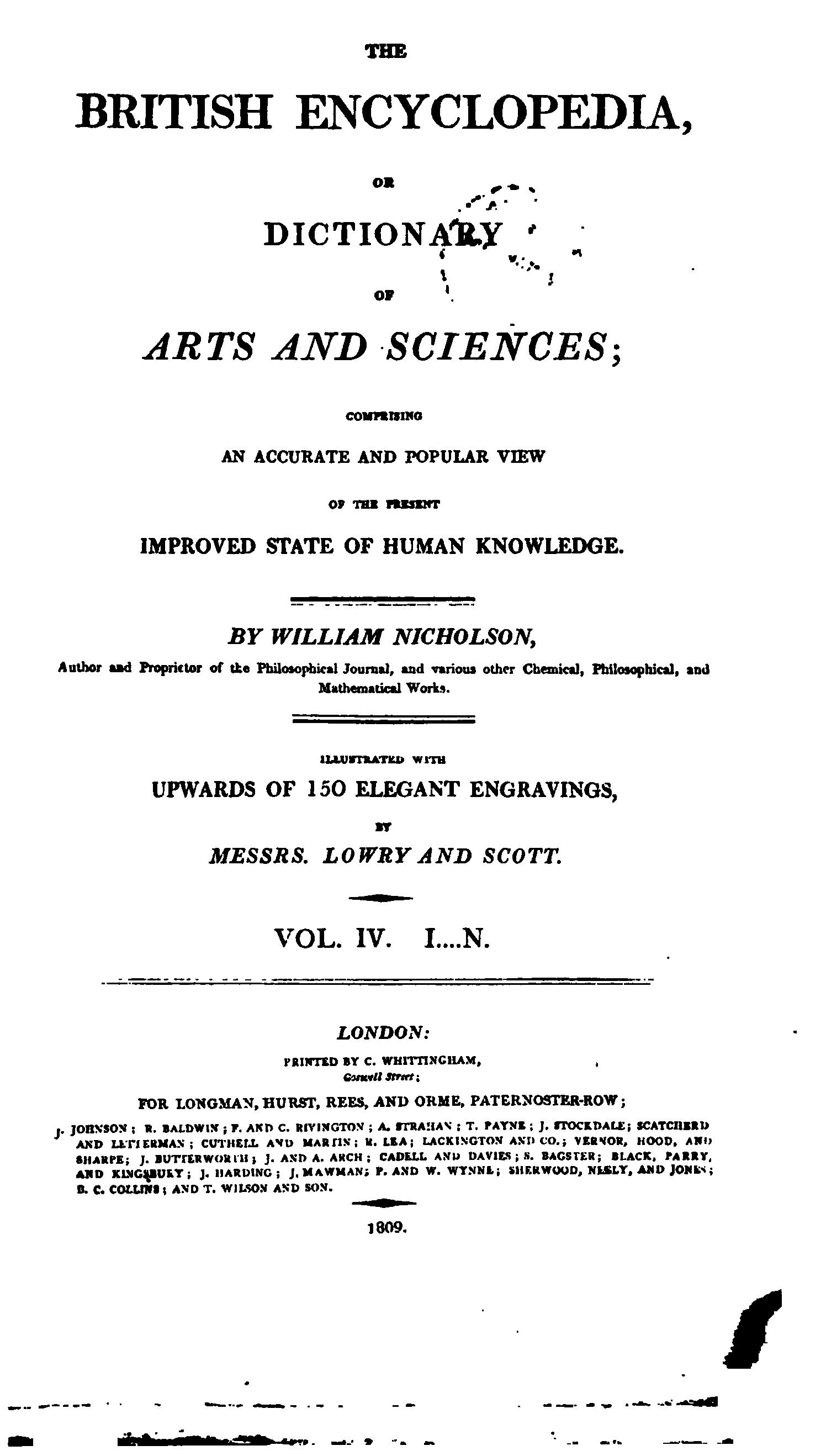
Title page of The British Encyclopedia, 1809, vol. 4

The British Encyclopedia, or Dictionary of Arts and Sciences, claimed by its publishers to be a work "Comprising an accurate and popular view of the present improved state of human knowledge", was published at London in 1809 in six octavo volumes and around 150 plates.

The title page credits William Nicholson as the author, and much of the work was overseen by Jeremiah Joyce. Some of the plates were drawn by John Farey Jr., and engraved by Wilson Lowry and Scott.

The work was published by a syndicate of twenty-three booksellers whose names appear on the title page of each volume, headed by the firm of Longman, Hurst, Rees, & Orme. Each purchased shares and in due time received a proportional profit from the eventual sales. This method of publishing was common in the 18th and early 19th century and was known as a conger. It was particularly suited to multi-part works such as encyclopaedias.

The Philadelphia publishing house of Mitchell, Ames, & White published three American editions of The British Encyclopedia. The first American edition appeared in 1816-17 but little else is known of this edition. The second American edition appeared in 1818 in twelve volumes, and the third American, also in twelve volumes, closely followed in 1819 and 1821.

In 1998 John Issitt compared the text of The British Encyclopedia with the text of Gregory's A Dictionary of Arts and Sciences, which was published in 1806-1807 and also edited by Jeremiah Joyce. Issitt suggests that Joyce developed Nicholson's Encyclopedia largely from the text of his prior work on Gregory's Dictionary, and he contends, without an empirical showing, that 50% of the text of the two works is identical. If Issitt is correct, given that Gregory's Dictionary appeared in two folio volumes and Nicholson's Encyclopedia was presented in six octavo volumes, it would seem that Joyce must have copied nearly the whole of Gregory's Dictionary into Nicholson's Encyclopedia. By observation of a sample of headwords and their articles between bergamot and bignonia, we find in Gregory 34 heads in 8 columns and in Nicholson 27 heads in 21 columns; of these, 17 articles share some text, and of these, only seven very short articles in Gregory are copied directly and with minimal paraphrasing into Nicholson. This is sufficient to demonstrate that Gregory's Dictionary was indeed a useful resource for Nicholson's Encyclopedia, but within this sample, less than two columns of text in Gregory can be found in Nicholson, and less than three columns of text in Nicholson can be found in Gregory. This sample then suggests that less than 25% of the text of Gregory found its way into Nicholson, and that of Nicholson's text, less than 15% can be traced to Gregory.

== Gallery ==
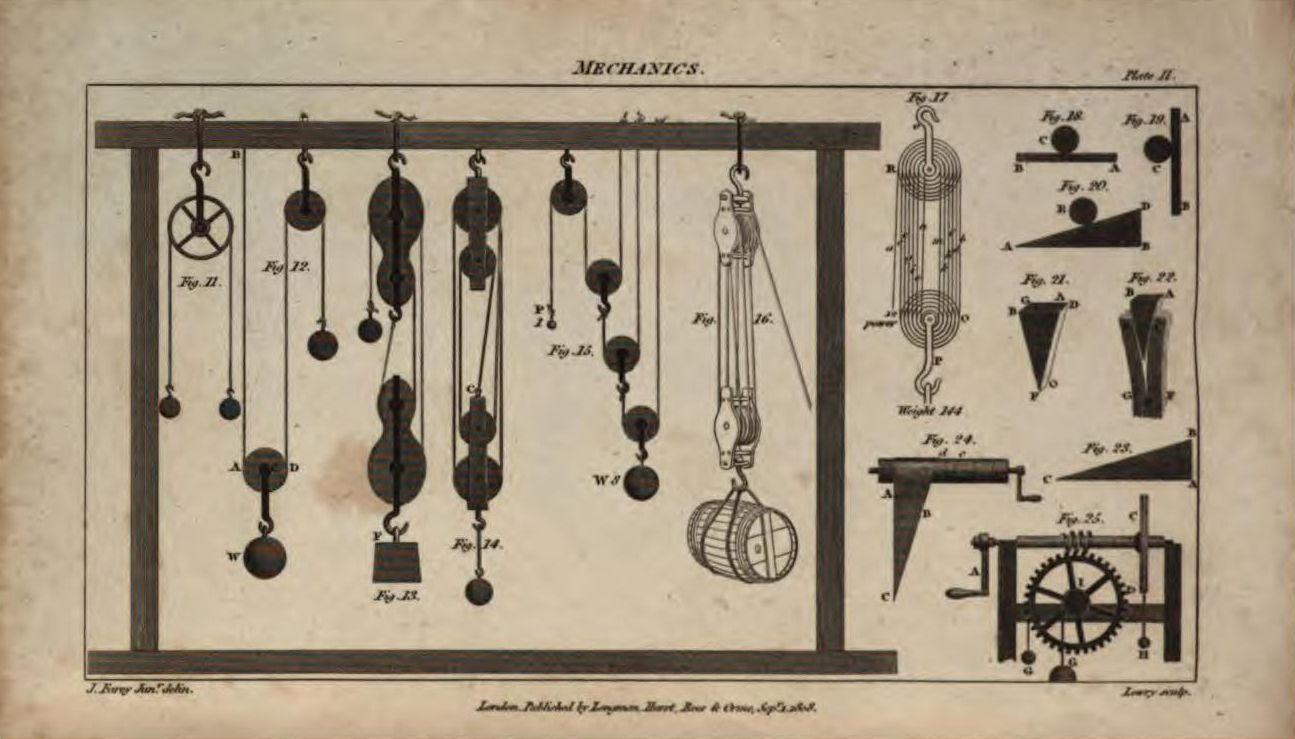
Plate II on Mechanics

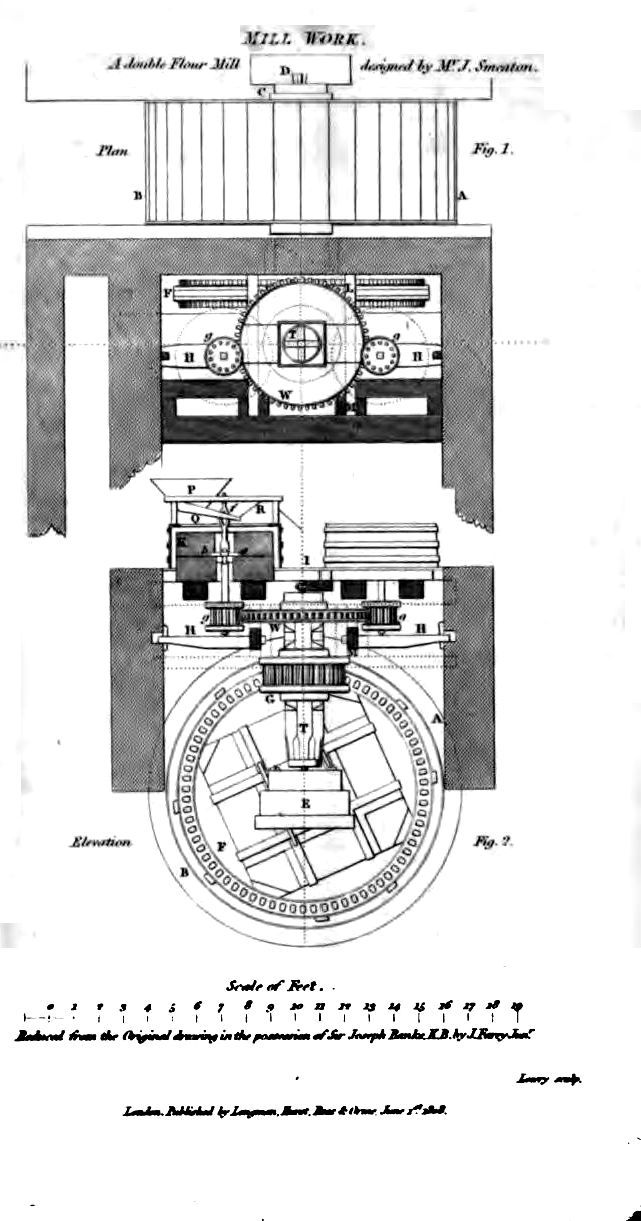
Plate on Mill Work

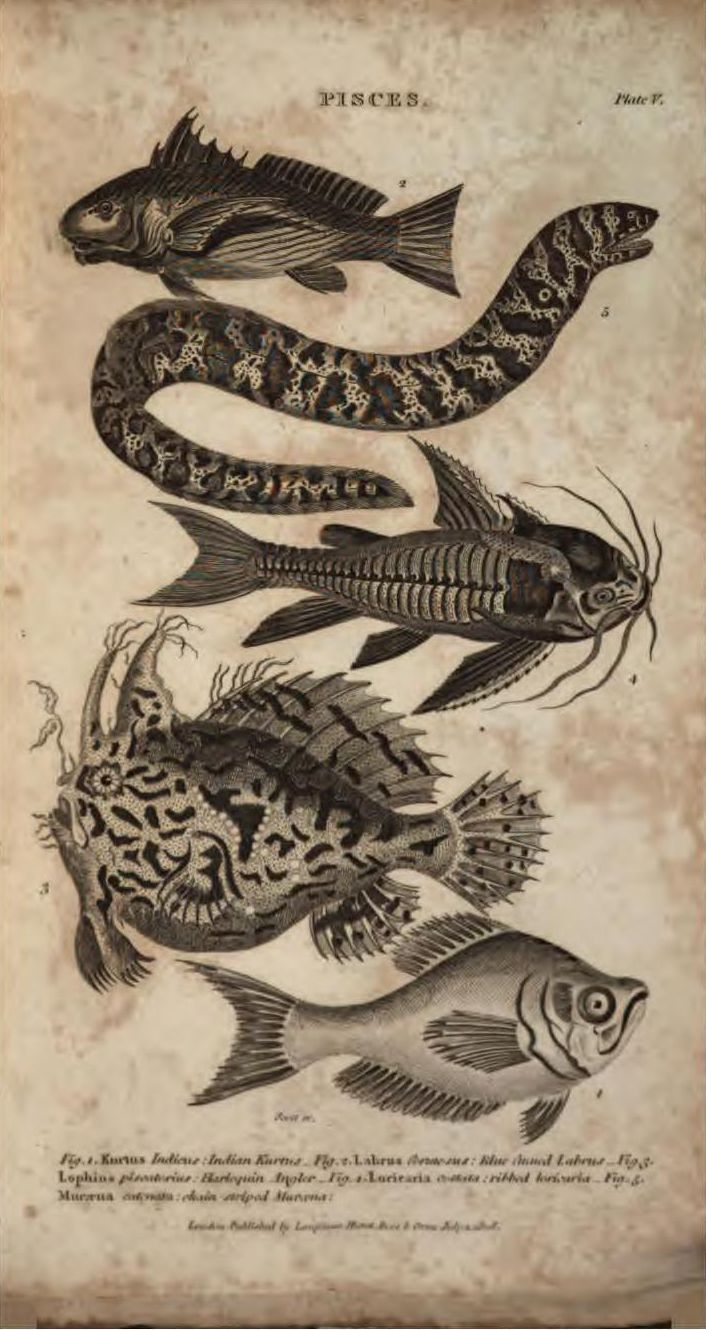
Plate V on Pisces

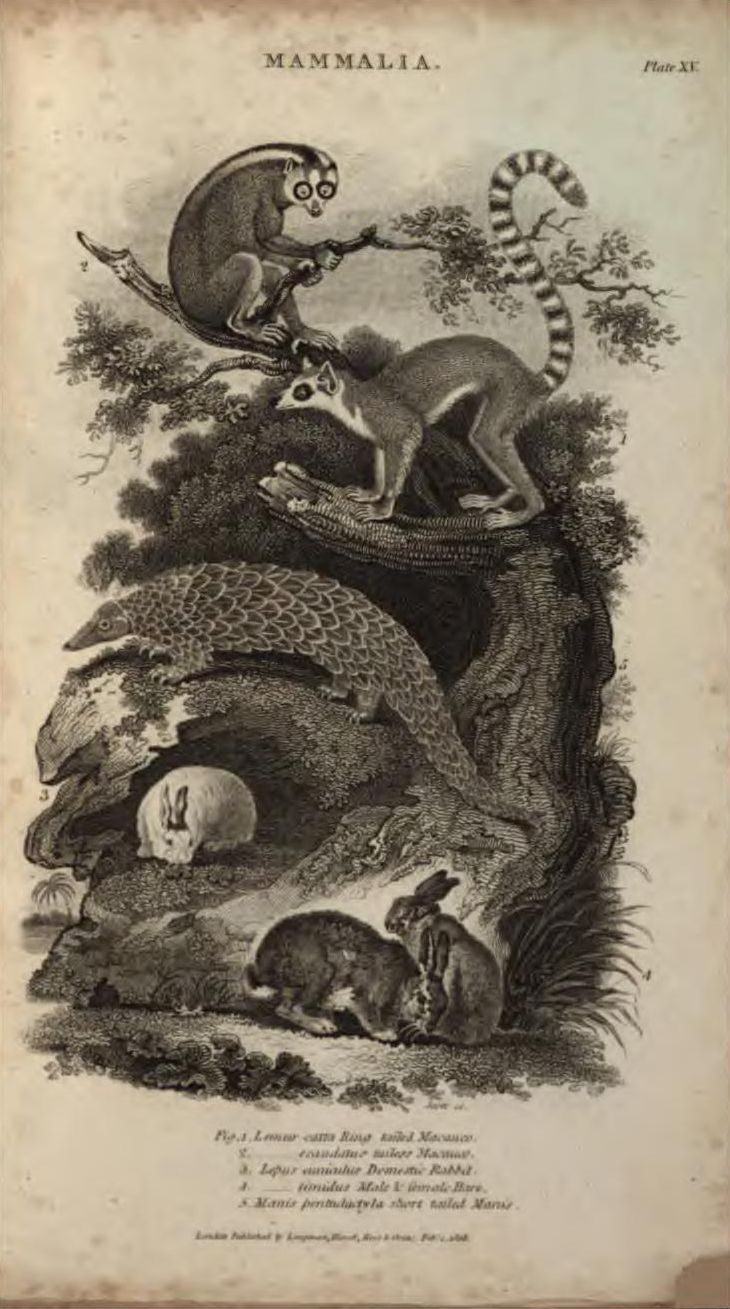
Plate XV on Mammalia
