= Joseph H. Goldsby =

Alabama representative

Joseph H. Goldsby was a politician in Alabama. He represented Dallas County, Alabama in the Alabama House of Representatives in 1872.

Henry Cochman testified that Alexander White, Joseph H. Goldsby, and Thomas Walker, and Ransom L. Johnson were his fellow Dallas County representatives in the legislature in 1872.

He was appointed a railway postal clerk. In 1875 he was appointed route agent of the post office.

== See also ==
- African American officeholders from the end of the Civil War until before 1900
