= Jeremiah Joyce =

English Unitarian minister and writer

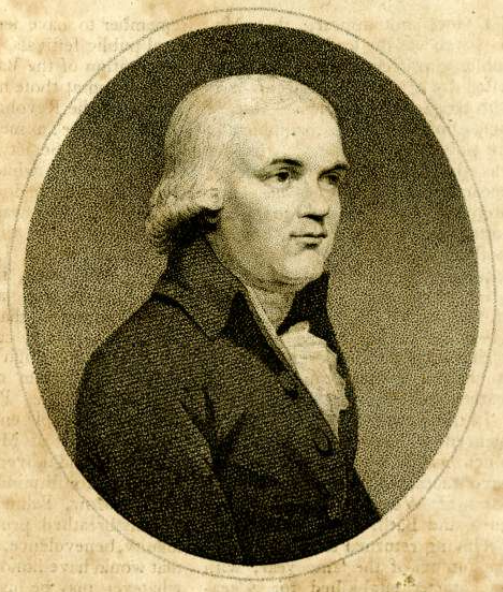
Jeremiah Joyce, 1794 engraving

Jeremiah Joyce (1763–1816) was an English Unitarian minister and writer. He achieved notoriety as one of the group of political activists arrested in May 1794.

== Early life ==
He was born 24 February 1763, the son of Jeremiah Joyce (1718–1788), a master woolcomber at Cheshunt, Hertfordshire, and his wife Hannah Somersett (1726–1818); his place of birth was Cheshunt, or Mildred's Court, Poultry, London, Hannah's family home. He attended the nonconformist school in Cheshunt run by the Rev. Samuel Worsley, who had attended Daventry Academy.

In 1777 Joyce was apprenticed to a glazier, John Willis, of Strand, London. Willis was a member of the Worshipful Company of Glaziers and Painters of Glass, and founded a building company, later Sykes & Son, that still exists (as of 2022). He did work on St Clement Danes church and the Middle Temple; and in 1778 took on his own son John as apprentice. After seven years, Joyce completed the apprenticeship, going to business on his own account as a journeyman.

Joyce worked in Essex Street, London. His associations were based on rational dissent and the Bowood circle. He knew nonconformist ministers, and publishers. Before the death of his father, and with the support of his brother, Joshua, and Hugh Worthington, he studied for the Unitarian ministry at New College, Hackney. He was one of its first intake of students in 1786, with Joseph Lomas Towers, son of Joseph Towers. He became proficient in mathematics and Latin.

== Stanhope household and activism ==
In 1790 Joyce was appointed to Lord Mahon, eldest son of Charles Stanhope, 3rd Earl Stanhope. His duties in the household extended to the younger children, and he acted as secretary to Stanhope.

Stanhope and Joyce shared radical political views: Stanhope by the end of 1789 was chairing the London Revolution Society, named for the centennial of the Glorious Revolution of 1688, and took the French Revolution to heart. As well as hiring Joyce, he dismissed his governesses, and required his daughter Hester Stanhope, age 14, to mind turkeys on a village green.

Joyce became a member of the Society for Constitutional Information (SCI) and of the London Corresponding Society (LCS) founded in early 1792. At SCI meetings he encountered John Augustus Bonney who was Tom Paine's lawyer; John Cartwright; Thomas Holcroft; Stewart Kyd; and others including a Mr Banks tentatively identified as Thomas Banks. He was involved in the distribution of Paine's works, to Samuel Fox at Derby and via Stanhope's residence.

By 1791, Joyce had joined the Unitarian Society (fuller name Unitarian Society for Promoting Christian Knowledge and the Practice of Virtue, to which was added "by the distribution of books"). In the following years he was involved in publications, and the Society had as associate Joseph Johnson. He joined the Essex Street Chapel congregation, and formed a long-standing relationship with Theophilus Lindsey, its founder. When Lindsey retired from the chapel in 1793, Joyce for a period was minister there with John Disney, who had shared the position with Lindsey from 1783. Joyce took the afternoon services, continuing until 1804 when Thomas Belsham took over the chapel.

Ahead of the penal transportation of the Scottish Martyrs to Liberty and Maurice Margarot of the LCS, Joyce on 28 March 1794 proposed an address of support from the SCI. It contained the sentiment "A full and fair Representation of the People of Great Britain we seek, with all the ardour of men and Britons". From 4 April the SCI and LCS worked together, to nominate delegates to a convention of the "Friends of Liberty". Joyce was chosen, with Holcroft, Kyd, William Sharp and Thomas Wardle.

== Treason charge and acquittal ==
A dozen activists were arrested in May, followed by the passing of the Habeas Corpus Suspension Act 1794, and Joyce was one of those picked up. On 12 May Thomas Hardy of the LCS was taken into custody at home by Bow Street Runners and King's Messengers. Shortly after that an ambiguous letter from Joyce to John Horne Tooke of the SCI, written within hours of Hardy's arrest. was intercepted by the authorities. John Thelwall was arrested on 13 May, at Beaufort Buildings, Strand, London where he was lecturing. Horne Tooke himself was arrested on 16 May. Others detained in the sweep included the silversmith John Baxter, successor to Margarot at the LCS; the businessman John Richter, LCS and an SCI associate; and Bonney and Kyd of the LCI.

On 14 May 1794 Joyce was at Stanhope's house Chevening in Kent, and was arrested while talking to Stanhope's sons, by John King and a King's Messenger. The charge was "treasonable practices". The arrest occurred at around 8 am. Joyce was being examined by the Privy Council by about 1 pm that day. He refused to answer any questions without a lawyer, which he was not allowed.

Joyce remained in custody until 19 May when, with others, he was committed to the Tower of London on a charge of high treason. While he was there, he was visited by his friend William Shepherd. Two treason trials took place in Edinburgh, in August and September. In September a grand jury of Middlesex concluded that there was evidence for treason charges against 12 men. Seven of the detained group were moved from the Tower to Newgate Gaol on 24 October. They were arraigned at the Old Bailey on 25 October. The judges involved were James Eyre, Chief Justice of the Common Pleas, and Archibald Macdonald, Chief Baron of the Exchequer, both of whom had been present at the Privy Council hearings.

After the acquittal of his co-defendants Hardy and Horne Tooke, charges against Joyce were dropped. He had suffered 23 weeks imprisonment. While Joyce was confined, supporters printed a book under his name. It was a sermon from earlier in the year, but contained also an appendix consisting of his examination by the Privy Council, and that of Bonney who was released at the same time. After his release it was being distributed by Arthur Aikin. His own work on the legal process, An Account of Mr. Joyce's Arrest for "treasonable Practices". His Examination ... With Remarks on the Speeches of Mr. Windham, &c., appeared in 1795.

== Later life ==
Joyce was released on 1 December 1794, and was welcomed back to Chevening, the village being lit up; if not by the rector, the Rev. Samuel Preston, chaplain to John Pitt, 2nd Earl of Chatham who was Lord Privy Seal. He was quick to pay a visit to William Shepherd at Gatacre.

Stanhope built Joyce a house in the grounds at Chevening. Joyce lived there for about four years, joined by his wife Elizabeth in 1796. He moved away in 1799. The troubled Stanhope household, where the father's insistence on home education was contentious, started to break up over the period. Daughter Lady Hester in the end moved out to live at Walmer with her uncle William Pitt the Younger, the Prime Minister, in 1803 according to John Ehrman; where he reportedly told her Tom Paine was "quite in the right" but he couldn't risk revolution.

At this period, Theophilus Lindsey had hopes to find Joyce a full place as Unitarian minister; but he found that impossible, as he explained to John Rowe (1764–1832). In fact, while Joyce had been a popular preacher with some Unitarian congregations after his release, he had become somewhat of an embarrassment. Rowe's congregation at Shrewsbury would not accept him in 1799. In 1801, Joyce was linked to William Winterbotham in a pamphlet by "The Enquirer" (William Atkinson). In later life he lived in Holly Terrace, Highgate, and succeeded Rochemont Barbauld as minister of a small Unitarian congregation at Rosslyn Hill.

In 1799 Joyce took up a position as tutor to the sons of Benjamin Travers the elder (1752–1818), treasurer to the Gravel Pit Chapel and father of Benjamin Travers, a grocer in the sugar trade. He was in business with William Smith, who was an SCI member. The firm, later known as Joseph Travers & Sons, was then trading as Smith, Travers & Kemble.

For many years, Joyce was the secretary of the Unitarian Society. At the end of Lindsey's life, Joyce was close to him. When Lindsey died in 1808, Joyce wrote an anonymous obituary, the "Brief account" in The Monthly Magazine; and took the lead from William Frend's obituary, which concentrated on Lindsey's religious involvement, to burn much of Lindsey's political correspondence, particular that dealing with the American revolution.

== Works ==
Joyce wrote a number of popular educational works on science and mathematics. He also contributed articles to Rees's Cyclopædia (1802–1819).

=== As editor ===
- A Narrative of the Sufferings of T. F. Palmer and W. Skirving, During a Voyage to New South Wales, 1794, on Board the Surprize Transport. Joyce prepared this work on the Scottish Martyrs from a manuscript by Thomas Fyshe Palmer brought from New South Wales by John White. Muir, Palmer and Skirving had serious criticisms of Capt. Patrick Campbell of the Surprize, but also of Margarot, included by Joyce in his introduction.

Joyce was largely responsible for the editing of two rival encyclopedic works bearing the names of others, George Gregory's Dictionary of Arts and Sciences (from 1803) and as managing editor of William Nicholson's British Encyclopedia, or Dictionary of Arts and Sciences (1809). These works shared a substantial portion of their texts.

=== Instructional ===
- Scientific Dialogues (1800, 2 vols.) Later editions, from 1807, in 7 vols.
- System of Practical Arithmetic (1808)
- A Familiar Introduction to the Arts and Sciences for the Use of Schools and Young Persons (1810)

Systematic Education (1816) was a collaboration with Lant Carpenter and William Shepherd.

== Family ==
Joyce married in 1796 Elizabeth Fagg, niece of Captain George Fagg (Slouney), who as a privateer of the Anglo-French War (1778–1783) ran the blockade of Gibraltar in 1780, commanding the Buck of Folkestone. The youngest of his six children, Hannah, born the year before Joyce's death, was fostered by his friend William Shepherd. She later married William Ridyard.
