= The Marine and General Mutual Life Assurance Society =

British insurance company

- Type: Mutual
- Traded as: MGM Assurance
- Industry: Financial Services
- Founded: 1852
- Founder: William Fane de Salis, John Utley Ellis, Captain Lawrence, Captain George Denny, James Allan, Patrick Douglas Hadow, Dr Beattie, M Ansell, Mr Radcliffe
- Defunct: 10 July 2018
- Headquarters: Worthing, England
- Key people: David Gulland (CEO); Laurie Edmans (Chairman)
- Products: Annuities, Life and Pensions
- Number of employees: 250 (2015)
- Website: www.marineandgeneralmutual.co.uk

The Marine and General Mutual Life Assurance Society (traded as MGM Assurance) was a British insurance company that was established in 1852. The company was dissolved on 10 July 2018, following the transfer of business to Scottish Friendly on 1 June 2015. The society was Great Britain's oldest registered company with the company registration number 00000006.

== History ==
=== Origins ===
When the society was started, seamen of the day were charged more for life assurance if they were teetotal, as water was considered by insurance companies of the 1830s and 1840s to be a dangerous element – both for its sanitary condition and volatile nature. This prompted the creation of the United Kingdom Temperance and General Provident Association in 1841 – which went on to champion longevity due to abstinence of alcohol on a seafaring voyage and a consequential reduction in premiums. The brain-child of the teetotal Robert Warner, this initial foray into the assurance market grew into The Marine Life and Casualty Mutual Assurance Society which moved to "extend the benefits of Life Assurance to all (whether Mariners or Passengers) who have to undergo the perils of the ocean".

==== First formal meeting and deed of settlement ====
The first formal meeting of the group was held at the offices of P&O in Leadenhall Street. on 20 January 1852 with the following gentlemen present:

- William Andrew Salius Fane de Salis, Director of the P&O
- John Utley Ellis, Director of the Screw Steam Shipping Company
- Captain Lawrence
- Captain George Denny of the Honourable East India Company's Service
- James Allan, Managing Director P&O
- Patrick Douglas Hadow, Director P&O

There were three others in attendance and it was largely due to their medical, actuarial and legal advice the Foundations of the Marine and General were based:

- Dr Beattie
- M. Ansell
- Mr Radcliffe

Based on this initial formal meeting, the deed of settlement was signed on 25 June 1852 but the complete registration of this document on 5 July 1852 is considered the official birthday of the society. With the deed of settlement all were still involved (with the exception of Captain Lawrence of which very little is known) but with some notable additions, all with the possible exception of Nathaniel Acworth of the Madras Railway Company, were leading British ship-owners of the day:

- Samuel Cunard
- James Hartley
- William Just
- Captain Charles Edward Mangles
- Joseph Malcolmson
- Nathaniel Brinley Acworth
- Robert Rodger

The make-up of this board shows that the initial challenge set by Robert Warner was being taken forward by the influential maritime men of the day.

=== The first general meeting ===
The first general meeting was held at the London Tavern and the second in the house of J. Hartley and Son, at 137 Leadenhall Street – the latter being the first address to be officially recorded as 'the offices of the Society'.

The first prospectus was published in the Shipping Gazette and aroused widespread interest "offering advantages to the seafaring portion of the community, which no office has yet attempted." The reaction was favourable and many shipping companies showed interest – P&O at once declared their intention to establish a superannuation scheme with the society. The Royal Mail Steam Packet Company having initially declined the proposal, were soon to change their minds. Even with such interest the Marine and General directors were convinced that they could offer still lower rates for marine life risks than those they had originally announced. A closer study of the limited marine mortality data was undertaken as well as a review of the current practice of other Life Offices. In terms of the mortality data they concluded that mortality among seafarers was approximately 50 per cent higher than among comparably select 'ordinary' lives. In terms of the practice of other life offices, the Marine and General directors found ample evidence that backed up the original claim that marine life assurance had been previously neglected.

The Royal Exchange, for example, had no such risks on their books, but were they to accept any they would require an extra premium of £2 per cent (1852) for European sea risk and considerably more for the Cape, Australia and the West Indies. The London Assurance Corporation had accepted only one such risk – the captain of a coasting steamer – and had charged 15s. per cent extra.

=== Sea risk scale ===
With this data in mind the final decision was the following scale:

- £2 for the West Indies
- £1 15s for the East Indies
- £1 10s for Australia
- £1 5s for North America
- £1 for the Cape
- 15s for the Mediterranean.

Assurances were offered for the voyage, by the year or for the whole life term and could be affected by a single or an annual payment. New tables were compiled and transmitted to the shipping companies and in the second half of 1852; £3,000 was received in premiums. By the end of the first complete year in the life of the society, the fund had increased to £11,000 and the names of more than a thousand seamen were on the books.

=== The formative years ===
In all, during the first hundred years, the Society only had ten chairmen – three of which had outstandingly long tenures.

On the day Mr Radcliffe reported the complete registration of the deed of settlement, Mr J. U. Ellis (also director of the Screw Steam Shipping Company) became the Society's first chairman. Ill health cut short his tenure and was succeeded by Mr P. D. Hadow, who was also a director of the P&O.

Both the chairman and board were conscious of the fact that there was a limit to the amount of Marine life business that could be obtained. Knowing that an assurance fund must increase or perish, the decision was taken to extend the business remit by introducing elements such as passenger life assurance and baggage insurance. The main focus was the extension of the society's operations into the field of 'general' (as opposed to 'marine') life assurance. In 1862, in order to remove any possible misapprehension that the society was solely concerned with life risks, the name 'Marine Life and Casualty Mutual Assurance Society' was abandoned and the present full name of the society adopted.

The change of name was followed by a change of address from 137 Leadenhall Street via 60 Fenchurch Street (now the Fenchurch Street Post Office) to 14 Leadenhall Street – the home of the society for the next sixty years.

By the time of Mr Hadow's death in 1876, in the twenty-three years of Mr Hadow's chairmanship the assurance fund grew from £3000 to £300,000.

Mr Hadlow's successor, the Rt. Hon. Hugh Childers, was not only the Chairman of the Royal Mail, but a public figure at the height of his political career and became War Secretary in 1880. Only when he became Chancellor of the Exchequer in 1882 did he relinquish his Chairmanship of the Society. Following Childers the next figure of note and of perhaps most significance was that of Sir Thomas Sutherland – elected in 1887.

Sutherland – again of the P&O – who had joined the board of the Marine and General in 1878 was the ‘man of destiny’ for whom The Society had been waiting. Of his Chairmanship of the P&O, Boyd Cable has written:

"By brilliant leadership he brought the Company through one severe and even desperate difficulty after another."

If there were no such dramatic incidents in the story of the Marine and General, that does not imply that his leadership of the society was any less brilliant than his leadership of the company. The date of Sutherland's election coincided with the creation of district agencies in the large commercial centres such as Liverpool, Manchester and Leeds. To provide a bridgehead into this new territory, the Directors negotiated the only amalgamation in which the Society has ever participated by taking over the business of the Briton Life Association. For a goodwill payment of £2,500 the Society acquired £12,000 a year in new premiums.

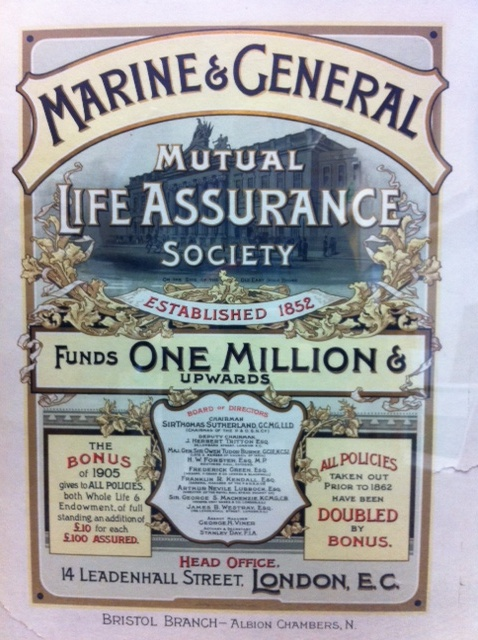
Note the Chair of Sir Thomas Sutherland

For Sutherland himself these twenty-five years were the culmination of an adventurous and colourful career. At the age of twenty the P&O had sent him out to China. Even though during this time there was almost constant war in this region, Sutherland still found time to organise The HongKong and Shanghai Banking Corporation and to take a daring hand in the reopening of Japan to world trade after its two centuries of self-imposed isolation. Recalled to London in 1866 he was made Assistant General Manager of the P&O two years later and joint managing director by the time he was thirty-eight. He proved his administrative genius by his work in preparing the company to meet the flood of competition that followed the opening of the Suez Canal. In 1880 he was elected Chairman of the P&O, and for the twenty-five of the thirty-four years of office he was also the Chairman of the Marine and General. In 1888 the number of its agents was increased by 460 to a total of 1,160 and by 1893 the premium income had been doubled.

‘We are certainly in a very sound position,’ said Childers at the annual meeting, ‘and to who we owe that, you all know.’

In 1896, proposing a vote of thanks of the chairman, a policy holder of forty years' standing said that his £500 policy, on which he had paid premiums amounting to around £350, was now worth nearly £1,000. There was every justification for Sutherland's claim that with respect to bonuses, "this Society may challenge comparison with any insurance office in the City of London."

By the turn of the century the revenue that had been ‘stagnant for twenty years’ at around about £40,000 had increased to nearly £150,000 and the Assurance Fund to nearly £1 million. ‘We have entered,’ said Sutherland, ’the field of competition for general life business.’ Under the last twelve years of his stewardship the Society continued to improve and consolidate. Revenue rose whilst the cost of obtaining new business was progressively cut. The number of policies sharing in the Quinquennial bonus distribution grew from 3,929 to 14,416 in 1914. A year after Sir Thomas resigned in 1912; the Assurance Fund had reached £2 million.

=== The First World War ===
If the imminence of the First World War was unforeseen, and its duration underestimated, its impact on Marine and General was also less than disastrous than at first seemed likely.

Although it was decided not to accept any new war risks, no one who was already a member was charged any additional premium on joining the armed forces or the transport services.

In all 191 members lost their lives on active service – 65 at sea and 126 on land – and these policies cost the society £86,000 against £4,900 received in extra premiums.

New business of course fell sharply; it was down by £40,000 in 1914 and by nearly £100,000 in 1916. Financially, however, by far the most serious effect of the war was on the Society's invested funds. By the end of the war the total depreciation of the society's investments was more than £350,000.

In 1920, the board once again elected a Royal Mail chairman, Mr Arthur Nevile Lubbock, under whose guidance the society was to make steady progress until the outbreak of the Second World War – even taking into account the slump of the 1920s. By 1935 the society was again doing more business than at any time since the boom years of 1919 and 1920 and by 1938 all records for new business were broken and the Assurance Fund approached the £4 million mark for the first time.

=== The Second World War ===
For the Marine and General, as a business organisation, the Second World War brought many problems but few dramatic incidents. Again, as in 1914, the society decided to leave untouched the policies of all existing members. But for new entrants, premiums to cover war risks were deliberately made prohibitive. The rapid rise of the assurance fund was brought to a standstill in September 1939 as new business dried up to a trickle – at the quinquennial valuation completed in 1939 it stood at £3,722,067 – five years later it had only increased to £3,877,922). Headquarters lost one-third of its male staff to the fighting forces in 1939, and more than half by the end of 1940. The nationwide sales network also disintegrated as agents were called up for national service. The Society, like all other Life Offices, took a deep breath and went into a state of suspended animation.

Unlike many City-based concerns, Marine and General did not desert its London home – though its most important documents were duplicated and certain activities transferred to temporary offices at Sevenoaks and Ifield. Under the chairmanship of the Hon. R. D. Denman, the directors met fortnightly throughout the war at 48 Fenchurch Street. The basement was made as bomb-proof as possible and there was no loss of lives or documents through enemy action. Fire-watching precautions were rewarded in May 1941, when London had its second big incendiary raid, when all the nearby buildings were gutted; No 48 was left standing in defiant isolation.

==== Chart of financial growth 1860 - 1950 ====
Year	New Sums Assured	Annual Premium Income	Assurance Fund
	£	£	£
1860	-	29,986	79,524
1870	-	31,667	237,270
1880	-	29,090	375,374
1890	200,285	59,524	595,376
1900	235,082	102,247	1,030,512
1910	336,245	145,494	1,766,166
1920	492,673	207,638	2,263,987
1930	358,871	230,114	3,485,917
1940	138,366	224,585	3,646,243
1950	1,175,207	493,689	4,422,464

=== 1950s onwards ===
The primary business of MGM Assurance continued to be life assurance, pensions and investments, through to 2008. In 1974 the company moved its headquarters from London to Worthing, West Sussex, on the site of what used to be the municipal swimming baths and home of the Worthing water polo team. In 2008 the company repositioned its business under the new trading name of MGM Advantage, and focused on retirement income products including investment backed and enhanced annuities. MGM Advantage was a founding member of the Pension Income Choice Association, an industry body created to improve retirement income options for customers.

=== Transfer to Scottish Friendly ===
In November 2013 TDR Capital, acquired the new business capability of Marine and General Mutual Life Assurance Society, including the MGM Advantage trademark with a new group structure formed, under MGM Advantage Holdings Limited. The transaction also involved the new group (which now trades as Retirement Advantage) buying the society's existing book of enhanced annuities and providing administration services to the society for its other business. The society closed to new business in November 2013 and the board and remaining management immediately started to pursue a strategy of finding the best "safe haven" for the remaining business. This process culminated in the transfer of the society's entire remaining business to Scottish Friendly Assurance Society in June 2015.

== Arms ==
The College of Arms granted Marine and General the following coat of arms:

Coat of arms of The Marine and General Mutual Life Assurance Society

Granted
23 February 1955
Crest
On a wreath of the colours, Issuant from the battlements of a square tower sable, a demi figure representing St Swithin, habited and mitred, proper supporting in the dexter hand a walking staff also sable ensigned with a cross paty convexed Or and holding with the sinister hand a book gules edged gold.
Escutcheon
Argent, a torch winged sable, enflamed proper; on a chief of the second a capstan also proper cabled Or between two escutcheons gold each charged with an escarbuncle Gules.
Supporters
On the dexter side a sea horse (Hippocampus) azure and on the sinister side a Chinese Dragon azure tufted gules.
Motto
Protect and provide.

== Bibliography ==
- Humpherson, L. H. (1952). The First Hundred Years of the Marine and General Mutual Life Assurance Society.
