= John Gale Jones =

John Gale Jones (1769–1838) was an English radical orator. Until its suppression in 1798, he was active in the London Corresponding Society. He was several times imprisoned for provocative agitation against the government.

== Early life ==
He was admitted to Merchant Taylors' School in 1783, and was then described as born on 16 October 1769. By profession he was a surgeon and apothecary, having been trained by William North, a member of the Royal College of Surgeons practising at Chelsea. It is questionable whether he was fully qualified as a physician; and Charles Roach Smith wrote that his political advocacy ruined his professional prospects.

== Activist ==
Jones was a member of the London Corresponding Society. He spoke effectively at the British and Westminster forums, and publicly supported the progress of the French Revolution. In James Gillray's caricature of the public meeting held at Copenhagen Fields on 12 November 1795, Jones is shown on the hustings to the left; and at the other meetings of that body he was one of the chief declaimers.

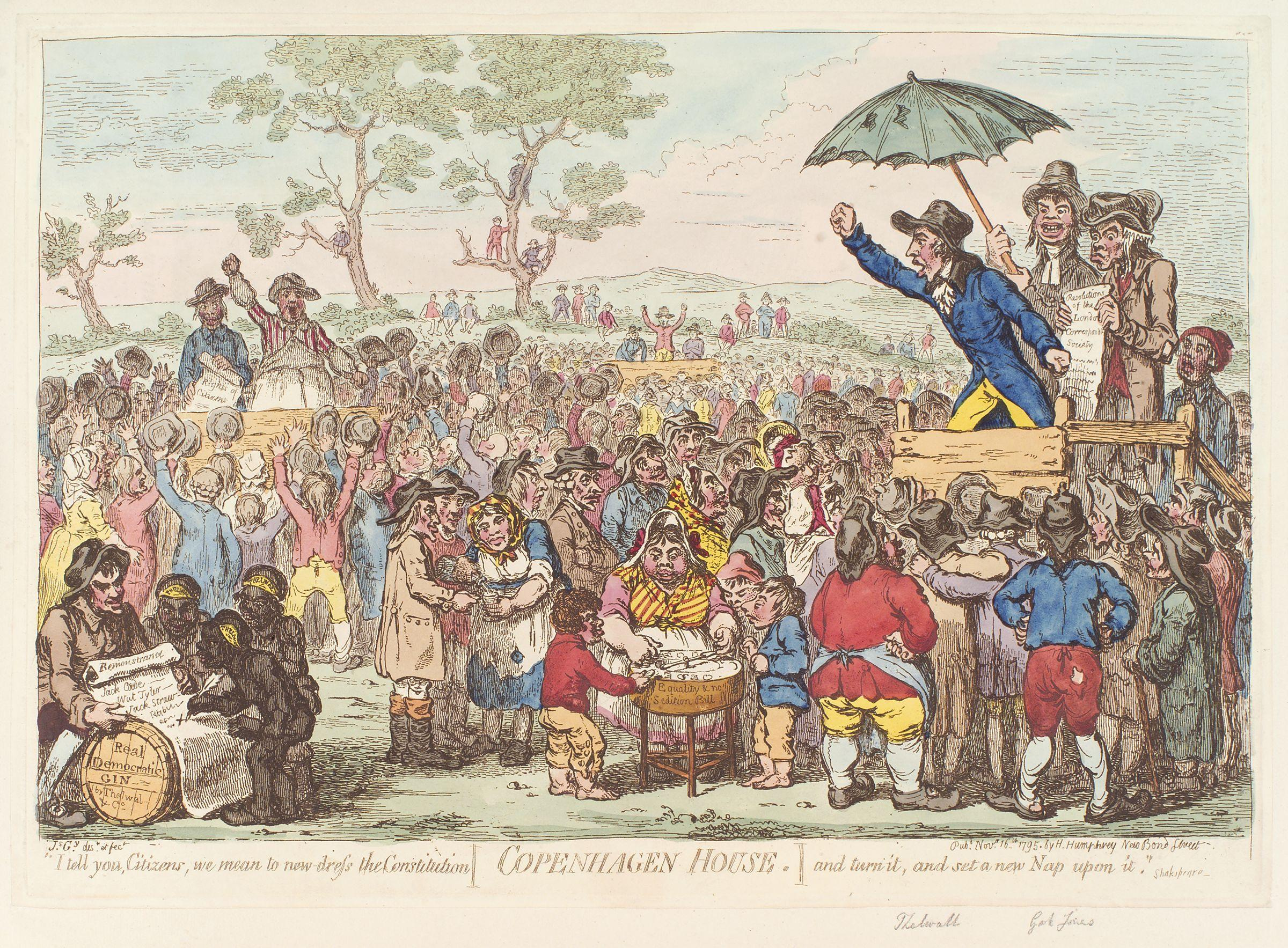
James Gillray's cartoon, Jones speaking (left side) at Copenhagen Fields on 12 November 1795.

On 11 March 1796 in that year he, and John Binns delivered lectures, as delegates from the London Corresponding Society, in Birmingham; but the meeting was broken up. Next year (9 April 1797) Jones was tried at Warwick before Justice Nash Grose, and, although defended by Samuel Romilly and Felix Vaughan, was convicted on one count, the seditious expression "that he was sent to know whether the people of Birmingham would submit to the Treason and Sedition Bills".

Early in 1810 Charles Philip Yorke insisted on the exclusion of strangers from the House of Commons during the debates on the Walcheren expedition. After a debate on this proceeding in the British forum, the result condemning Yorke was announced outside the building in a placard drawn up by Jones. Yorke brought the matter before the House of Commons as a breach of privilege (19 February 1810), and Jones was ordered to attend the house. He acknowledged the authorship, was voted guilty, and committed to Newgate Prison, where he remained until 21 June, when the House of Commons rose. He declined to recognise the legality of his restraint or to petition for his release, and was, it is said, only got out at last by a stratagem. During his imprisonment, Francis Burdett, Romilly, and Sir James Hall made motions for his release, but they were all unsuccessful, although in Romilly's case the majority was only 160 to 112. A letter which Burdett wrote on Jones's treatment led to his committal to the Tower.

In this same year, 26 November 1810, Jones was sentenced to twelve months' imprisonment, and ordered to provide sureties to keep the peace for three years, for a libel on Lord Castlereagh. The rumour that he was ill-treated in this prison was found, on the investigation of Coleridge and Daniel Stuart, to be groundless.

== Later life ==
At the Westminster elections of 1818 and 1820 he exerted himself, but he took little further part in politics. He died at Somers Town on 4 April 1838. His portrait was engraved and published by P. Brown, of 4 Crown Street, Soho, on 14 March 1798.

== Works ==
About 1798 he published Observations on the Tussis Convulsiva, or Hoopping-cough, as read at the Lyceum Medicum Londinense. In 1796 he published Sketch of a Political Tour through Rochester, Chatham, Maidstone, and Gravesend. Other works were:

- ‘Speech at Westminster Forum on 9, 16, 23, and 30 Dec. 1794’ (in favour of parliamentary reform), 1795.
- ‘Substance of Speech at the Ciceronian School, Globe Tavern, Fleet Street, 2 March 1795’ (in favour of Charles James Fox), 1795.
- ‘Account of Proceedings of London Corresponding Society, near Copenhagen House, 26 Oct. 1795, including speeches of Citizens Binns, Thelwall, Jones.’
- ‘Oration at the Great Room in Brewer Street on General Washington,’ 1796; new edition, with alterations, in 1825, when Jones wrote to George Canning asking for his subscription to the reprint.
- Farewell oration, including a short narrative of his arrest and imprisonment in the Birmingham dungeon, 1798.
- ‘Invocation to Edward Quin of the Society of the Eccentrics,’ 1803. It was a poetical invocation, descriptive of a coterie, mostly of newspaper writers, meeting in a tavern.
- ‘Galerio and Nerissa’ (anon.), 1804, a romantic tale, with some verse.
- ‘Five Letters to George Tierney,’ 1806.
- ‘Westminster Election. Proceedings at Meeting held at the Crown and Anchor, Strand, 1 June 1818, to secure the Election of Henry Hunt, with the Speech at length of Gale Jones.’
- ‘Speech at the British Forum’ (on the justice of prosecuting Richard Carlile for continuing to publish works of Tom Paine), 1819.
- Substance of speeches at the British forum (on the same issue), 1819.
