= Astrotheology =

Theological discipline

Astrotheology is a discipline combining the methods and domains of space science with systematic theology. Astrotheology concerns the theological, cultural, and ethical implications of space exploration and identifies the elements of myth and religion in space science. Astrotheology is a "multi-disciplinary branch of theology that takes up the relationship between God and the creation, especially the creation of the universe over time." Ted F. Peters envisions astrotheology as "the meeting point between theologians and astrobiologists." A.C. Pieterse describes the field as a "prophetic wormhole that relates space-time to eschatological transformation", a theology of nature rather than a natural theology.

== History ==
A.. C. Pieterse traces the "seeds" of astrotheology to the works of Greek philosophers such as Leucippus, Democritus, Epicurus, and Lucretius who "held that [the] cosmos is infinitely large, with an infinite number of patterns that could sustain intelligence." The theologian Ted Peters similarly identifies ancient debates on the plurality of worlds (aperoi kosmoi) as a starting point for astrotheology, tracing it from Aristotle through to Thomas Aquinas, Jean Buridan, and William of Ockham.

The word astrotheology, hyphenated as astro-theology, first appears in a tract by the Anglican clergyman William Derham. For Derham, the task of this discipline was to "glorify God by stressing the immensity and magnificence of God's creation." Derham advocated a chronology of space science broken into three eras, the Ptolemaic, the Copernican, and post-Copernican. In 1855, Edward Higginson published a series of four lectures, separating astrotheology into an earlier Jewish period and a modern period, the former regarding the mythology of ancient Israelites and the latter encompassing "modern philosophical views of the solar system and the fixed stars."

== Relationship to other fields ==
For Peters, astrotheology is "at minimum, a theology of space science". It connects with astrobiology, challenging the concept of extraterrestrial intelligence and engaging in discussions about the extent of God's creation. Astrotheology explores the spiritual dimensions inspired by space sciences, and uncovers hidden religious meanings in secular experiences. Astrotheology collaborates with astroethicists to propose public policies related to scientific space exploration and ethical considerations. These policies may include guidelines for responsible space exploration, regulations for the protection of celestial bodies and ecosystems, protocols for interactions with potential extraterrestrial life, and frameworks for international cooperation in space exploration efforts.

== See also ==
- Worship of heavenly bodies
- Exotheology
- Religion in space

== Notes ==
=== Works cited ===
- Pieterse, A.C. (2021-12-15). "Astrotheology: A proactive contextualization of novelty within space exploration". Acta Theologica. 41 (2): 156–175. doi:10.4314/actat.v41i2 (inactive 11 July 2025). ISSN 2309-9089.
- Peters, Ted (2009). "Astrotheology and the ETI Myth". Theology and Science. 7 (1). Informa UK Limited: 3–29. doi:10.1080/14746700802617097. ISSN 1474-6700.
- Peters, Ted (2013-10-28). "Astrotheology". The Routledge Companion to Modern Christian Thought. Routledge. doi:10.4324/9780203387856-78. ISBN 978-0-203-38785-6.
- Peters, Ted; Hewlett, Martinez; Moritz, Joshua M.; Russell, Robert John (2018). Astrotheology. Eugene, Oregon: Cascade Books. ISBN 978-1-5326-0641-0.
- Peters, Ted (2021). "Astrotheology's contribution to public theology: From the extraterrestrial intelligence myth to astroethics". HTS Theological Studies. 77 (3): 1–8. doi:10.4102/hts.v77i3.6855. hdl:2263/84506. ISSN 0259-9422. S2CID 238734716.
