= Scottish Friendly =

British mutual life and investment organization

Scottish Friendly Assurance Society Limited
- Trade name: Scottish Friendly
- Company type: Friendly Society
- Industry: Insurance
- Founded: 1862
- Headquarters: Glasgow, Scotland, UK
- Area served: Ireland, United Kingdom
- Key people: John McGuigan, Chairman; Stephen McGee, CEO; Alan Rankine, CFO
- Products: Long-term insurance and investment products
- Total assets: £4.6 billion (as at 31 December 2023)
- Number of employees: 350
- Subsidiaries: Scottish Friendly Asset Managers Limited; Scottish Friendly Insurance Services Limited; SFIS (Nominees) Limited
- Website: www.scottishfriendly.co.uk

Scottish Friendly Assurance Society Limited is a leading mutual life and investments organisation based in Glasgow, Scotland. It provides a range of investment and protection products and provides life and investment products and services to other financial organisations.

It operates throughout the United Kingdom and Republic of Ireland and has over 838,000 members and over 1 million policyholders. As of 31 December 2023, the society looked after assets worth over £4.6 billion.

== History ==
=== Early beginnings ===
Scottish Friendly was established in 1862 as the City of Glasgow Friendly Society, and was a breakaway movement from the Royal Liver Friendly Society, whose headquarters were in Liverpool.

The first meeting of the City of Glasgow Friendly Society took place in the Bell Hotel, 68 Trongate, on 16 September 1862. The first committee consisted of seven men — James Logan (chairman), John Stewart (secretary), James Semple, William Jack, David Black, James Wilson and William Roche. The founder of the Society was John Stewart, who guaranteed a fund of £1,500. John Stewart would go on to become the Society's general manager and treasurer.

During the first nine months of the Society's existence, branches were opened in Aberdeen, Edinburgh, Bathgate and Perth. In 1867/68, the Society opened branches in Belfast, Sunderland, Troon, Kirriemuir, Kilsyth, Kirkwall, Manchester, Leeds, Dalry, Blairgowrie and Kilwinning.

By the end of 1884 the Society's surplus was £14,276 and the membership was in the region of 70,000. In 1890, James Stewart took over the management of the Society along with father, John Stewart.

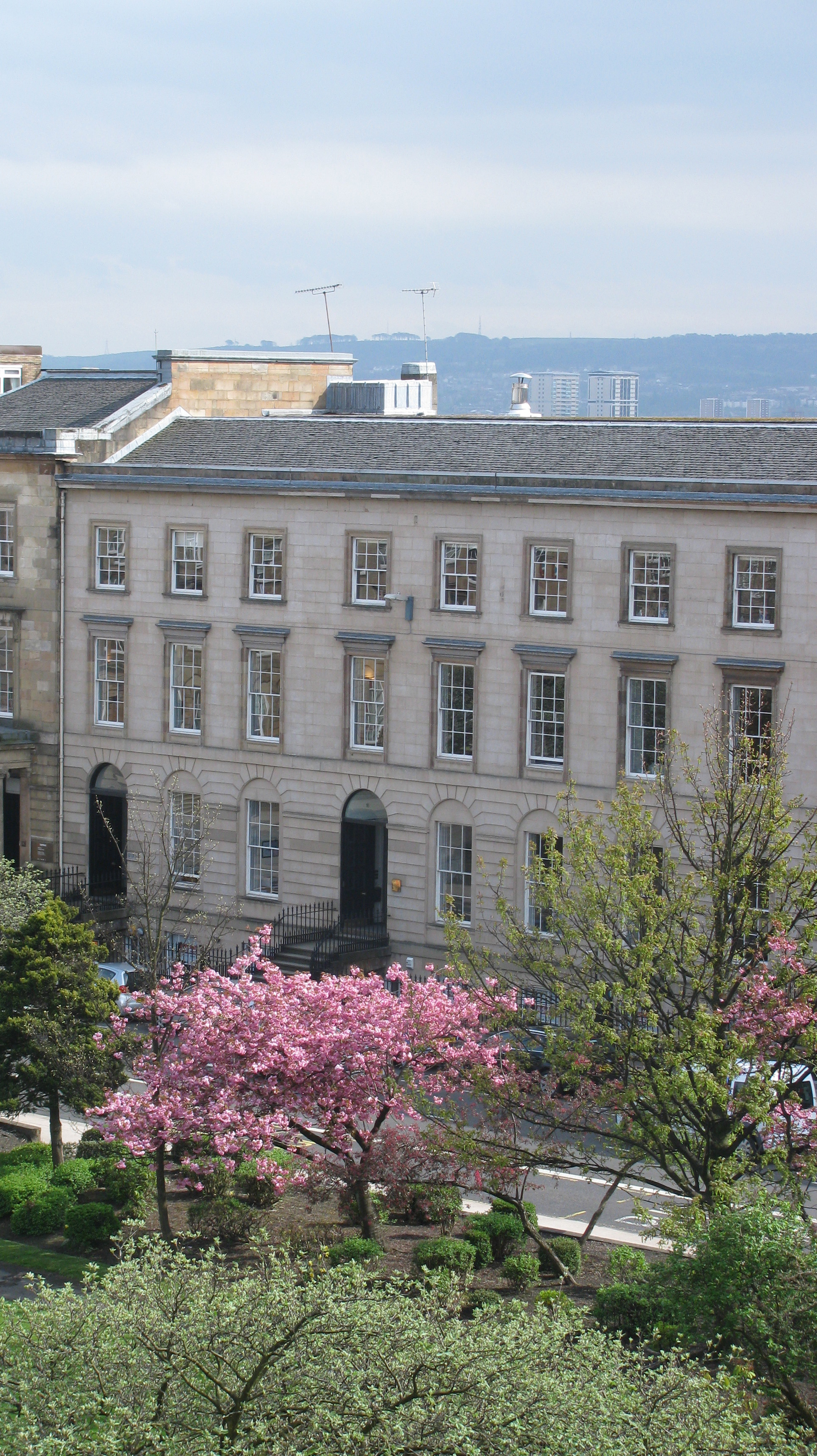
Scottish Friendly House

=== Towards the jubilee ===
On 19 April 1893, James Stewart succeeded his father as managing treasurer of the Society. By the end of 1896 the Society's membership had risen to 104,833.

On 16 May 1900, the Society obtained a typewriter on a week's trial. The Board appointed the first female member of staff – a typist who was paid 10s a week.

On 17 October 1912, Tom Johnston joined the board. A jubilee concert for the Society was held in Glasgow City Halls on 21 November 1912.

=== The World Wars ===
In 1914, during World War 1, the Society cancelled a clause that stated that the sum payable should be reduced if death occurred as the result of war.

In August 1916, all 10,817 members of the Hulme Philanthropic Burial Society in Manchester voted that they should be taken over by the Society.

In June 1919, Tom Johnston was appointed vice-president of the Society. In 1922, he became a Member of Parliament and, on 10 October 1932, was appointed as James Stewart's deputy and successor, eventually taking over as general manager in 1934. In 1941, Johnston was appointed wartime Secretary of State for Scotland by Prime Minister Winston Churchill. He retired as the Society's general manager in 1946.

=== Post war ===
On New Year's Day 1958, the Society took over the business and the members of the Western Mutual Assurance Society of Glasgow, incorporating 3,000 members and funds of £500,000. On 1 February 1960, the Dundee Burial Collecting Society approached the Society and another 15,116 members were incorporated with funds of £170,000.

In 1962, the Society celebrated its centenary. It was then the fifth largest collecting friendly society in the British isles with 20 branches in Scotland, six in Northern Ireland, five in south Wales, and 24 in England. Annual income was £1,150,000 with funds of around £6,800,000.

In 1968, the society purchased a Honeywell mainframe computer. The size of a small living room, it could store 256 kilobytes of data.

In the late 1970s, the Society began to make inroads to the endowment market and towards the end of the decade endowments represented 30% of new business.

=== 1992 and the "birth" of Scottish Friendly ===
The 1990s marked a decade of significant change for the City of Glasgow Friendly Society. The Friendly Societies Act 1992 allowed societies to become incorporated organisations, to launch subsidiaries and offer a wider range of products and services. The City of Glasgow Friendly Society became an incorporated organisation in 1992, and acquired a small friendly society, Scottish Friendly, and assumed its name.

In 1994 Scottish Friendly left its Bath Street head office and moved to new premises at 16 Blythswood Square, Glasgow.

During the 1990s, Scottish Friendly expanded, shifting its business model more to direct marketing focusing on tax-exempt savings plans for adults and children.

In 1998, Scottish Friendly appointed a new finance manager, Fiona McBain, who would become the first woman to sit on the board. The same year, the company launched its own website.

In 2004 there was a restructuring of the business and gross premium income grew by 4% to £68m. Scottish Friendly's assets reached a record £420m. The following year Bob Thomson retired as chief executive after more than 30 years' service.

On 1 January 2006, Fiona McBain became group chief executive. The same year, Scottish Friendly secured the contract to provide Nucleus with back-office and logistical support for its wrap business.

In 2007, Scottish Friendly took over Scottish Legal Life, creating the largest transfer of engagements in the history of UK friendly societies. Having earlier acquired Rational Shelley (2005), Preston Operative (2006), and Pioneer Friendly, 2007 closed with the transfer of the London Aberdeen & Northern Mutual Assurance Society (LANMAS).

In 2008, Norwich Union (now Aviva) approached Scottish Friendly to administer its wrap business. The same year, Scottish Friendly won the Orange Prize for best use of technology at the Scottish Business Awards.

In 2011, Scottish Friendly began negotiations with Citi, part of Citigroup, with a view to selling Scottish Friendly's wrap administration business, which was handling around £4bn of funds. On 1 January 2012, 134 Scottish Friendly employees were transferred, together with its offices in St Vincent Street and West George Street, to the American bank. In December, Scottish Friendly reported its best month for online sales, exceeding £500,000 in a single month for the first time.

In 2012, Scottish Friendly launched a partnership with BGL Group to launch Beagle Street. In the same year Scottish Friendly launched a direct to consumer life insurance partnership with Neilson Financial Services under the brands Smart Insurance and British Seniors Insurance Agency.

By 2014 the group has also added distribution for Axa Sun Life (for protection and ISA products), Group Life Assurance with the newly branded Havensrock (from Punter Southall) and was distributing in the Republic of Ireland through Hello.ie.

In June 2013, Scottish Friendly won the Financial Services Company of the Year Award at the Scottish Business Awards 2013.

On 1 June 2015, Scottish Friendly took over the oldest actively trading organisation in the UK, Marine & General Mutual, doubling Scottish Friendly's assets to over £2 billion.

In January 2017 Jim Galbraith was appointed chief executive of Scottish Friendly. Previous roles included appointed actuary, director of strategy and, from 2009, deputy chief executive. He was appointed to the board as an executive director in April 2006.

In 2018 Scottish Friendly acquired a bundled group pension business from Mobius Life, with assets over £350 million.

2019 was a landmark year for Scottish Friendly, with the completion of a significant acquisition of a book of business from financial services provider Canada Life; this helped to consolidate Scottish Friendly's position in the financial services industry. The acquisition saw assets under management increase by £2.4 billion to over £5 billion, while the number of members increased by 127,000 to around 700,000. In 2019 Scottish Friendly were also awarded the ‘Best Junior ISA Provider’ at the Investment Life & Pensions awards. In 2019 and 2020 Scottish Friendly were also crowned winner of the ‘Best UK Mutual Insurer’ award by the CFI.

== Operations ==
=== The group and its subsidiaries ===
Scottish Friendly Assurance Society Limited (SFAS) is a friendly or mutual society and the largest mutual life office in Scotland. Scottish Friendly has three wholly owned subsidiaries:

- Scottish Friendly Asset Managers Limited (conducts the business of managers for the transactions in Scottish Friendly ISAs, and Child Trust Fund)
- Scottish Friendly Insurance Services Limited (provision of administration services)
- SFIS (Nominees) Limited (nominee company in relation to Scottish Friendly Insurance Services Limited's ISA custody assets).

Scottish Friendly Investment Funds ICVC, an open-ended investment company, provides the stocks and shares component of the Scottish Friendly ISA and child trust fund.

=== Senior management ===
==== Executive ====
(Source)

- Stephen McGee (chief executive)
- Alexander Manas (commercial director)
- Alan Rankine (chief financial officer)
- Aileen Abernethy (head of operational control and conduct risk)
- Jill Mackay (head of marketing)
- Stephen Cambell (chief operating officer)
- Gen Humphreys (chief risk officer)
- Pam Simmons (HR director and company secretary)

==== Board of directors ====
(Source)

- John McGuigan (chair)
- Kerr Luscombe (vice-chair)
- Anja Balfour
- Susan Beckett
- Mark Laidlaw
- Mai Fenton
- Olive Gaughan
- Stephen McGee (chief executive officer)
- Alan Rankine (chief financial officer)

== Sponsorships ==
Since 1998, Scottish Friendly has supported reading and literacy in remote and disadvantaged areas in Scotland through its sponsorship of the Scottish Friendly Children's Book Tour, an outreach tour organised by the Scottish Book Trust. The tour was extended in 2010 to include England and in 2017 for the first time to Northern Ireland. The Book Tour allows young people, parents and teachers to meet leading children's authors. Children's Laureates Julia Donaldson MBE, Malorie Blackman, and Chris Riddell have been involved in the programme, which has reached over 500,00 children and adults and has received several arts and business awards. 2018 marked the 20th anniversary of the tour. The tour has visited over 100,000 children across primary and secondary schools throughout the UK.

In 2020, due to the COVID-19 pandemic in the United Kingdom, the Scottish Friendly Children's Book Tour went digital for the very first time by creating video content distributed across social media platforms.
