= London Tavern =

Notable pub and meeting place in London in the 18th and 19th centuries

Coordinates: 51.5137°N 0.0843°W

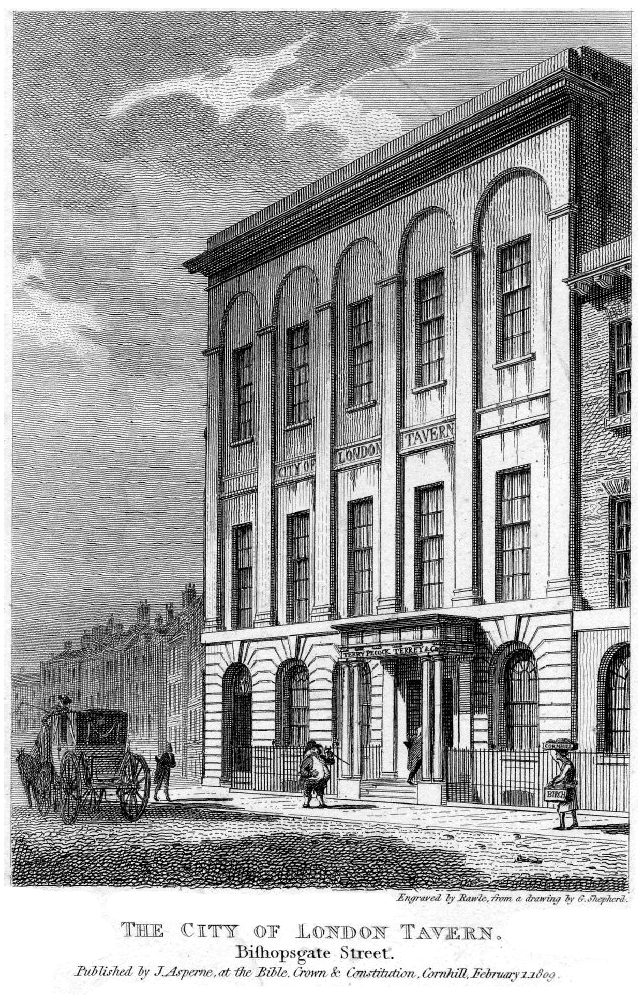
The London Tavern in 1809

The City of London Tavern or London Tavern was a notable meeting place in London during the 18th and 19th centuries. A place of business where people gathered to drink alcoholic beverages and be served food, the tavern was situated in Bishopsgate in the City of London (the site today of Nos. 1–3 Bishopsgate).

== History ==
The original tavern was destroyed in a fire on 7 November 1765 and the new building was designed by William Jupp the elder (with support from William Newton, 1765–1768) and opened in September 1768. In 1828, the proprietor was Charles Bleaden. The building was demolished in 1876. The tavern boasted a large and well-decorated dining room with Corinthian columns. It hosted numerous public and private meetings held to rally support to various political, charitable and other causes.

Charles Dickens presided at several meetings, including a dinner for the benefit of the Sanatorium for Sick Authors and Artists in 1841, at the annual dinner of the General Theatrical Fund in 1851, and at the launch of the Playground and General Recreation Society in 1858. While he was attending a dinner at the London Tavern on 14 April 1851, Dickens learned of the death of his daughter Dora Annie Dickens.

== Notable meetings ==
- 1769 – The Society of Gentlemen Supporters of the Bill of Rights was founded at the London Tavern on 20 February to support John Wilkes after he was expelled from the House of Commons.
- 1788 – The London Tavern hosted a meeting of the Revolution Society discussing the French Revolution.
- 1789 – In 1789, pro-slavery campaigner George Hibbert spoke at a meeting of Merchants at the London Tavern, seeking to demolish William Wilberforce’s speech on abolition of slavery in a 40-minute address entitled 'The Slave Trade Indispensable…'.
- 1791 – On 4 November a Revolution Dinner was held at the London Tavern, with Thomas Walker, Joseph Priestley, Tom Paine, and Jérôme Pétion de Villeneuve.
- 1805 – On 23 May the London Tavern hosted a meeting chaired by Sir Francis Baring that led to the formation of the London Institution.
- 1808 – On 20 October, Members of the Restoration Committee of St George the Martyr, Southwark met to celebrate the completion of the internal and external restoration of the church in 1807-1808.
- 1818 – On 18 March, a public meeting took place at the City of London Tavern, under the chairmanship of Benjamin Shaw MP when a new society known as the Port of London Society was formed to minister to the religious needs of seamen. The charity, which is based in Southampton is now called Sailors' Society.
- 1822 – Supporters of Francisco Antonio Zea and South American independence movements held a dinner on 10 July at the London Tavern to show support and raise money for Colombia.
- 1824 – On 18 Feb Marc Brunel, William Smith MP and a provisional board of directors hosted the first public meeting for the Thames Tunnel project which culminated with the sale of 1,250 shares.
- 1824 – The National Institution for the Preservation of Life from Shipwreck (today the Royal National Lifeboat Institution) was founded on 4 March 1824 at a meeting in the London Tavern.
- 1825 – On 14 June, the Language Institution, a society "in aid of the propagation of christianity throughout the world" held its first meeting.
- 1839 – Proprietors of Great Western Railway met to decide whether Brunel's broad gauge or Stephenson's narrow gauge should prevail.
- 1847 – Frederick Douglass's "Farewell address to the British people, London." London Morning Chronicle, 31 March 1847.
- 1848 – Ninth reunion of the General Theatrical Fund, chaired by Sir Edward Bulwer-Lytton and supported by Charles Dickens, at which the announcement was made of Queen Victoria's subscription of 100 guineas annually to the fund.
- 1851 – A March meeting of coffee merchants condemned the high price and the adulteration of coffee sold to "the lower class of consumer".
- 1852 – The first general meeting of The Marine and General Mutual Life Assurance Society was held at the London Tavern.
- 1853 – The Great meeting on the Eastern Question after Turkey declared war against Russia on October 4 1853, beginning the Crimean War
- 1858 – The first meeting of The Railway Benevolent Society took place at the London Tavern on Saturday 8 May. At this meeting, a resolution was carried unanimously, stating that the society should be called the Railway Benevolent Institution. George Glyn, 1st Baron Wolverton, was the first President of this institution.
- 1858 – a festival dinner was held on 1 June to launch the Playground and General Recreation Society. Charles Dickens presided and proposed the creation of playgrounds in St Pancras and Marylebone in London.
- 1859 – The British acclimatisation society was founded following a meeting held on 21 January at the London Tavern attended by Richard Owen and others.
- 1863 – A 15 December meeting at the London Tavern agreed the formation of Middlesex County Cricket Club.
- 1865 – The London Tavern is depicted in a painting An Infant Orphan Election at the London Tavern, "Polling" by George Elgar Hicks.

== Fictional meetings ==
- In Dickens's Nicholas Nickleby, the London Tavern is the location for the public meeting held "to take into consideration the propriety of petitioning Parliament in favour of the United Metropolitan Improved Hot Muffin and Crumpet Baking and Punctual Delivery Company."
