= Edward Higginson =

English Unitarian minister and author

Edward Higginson (9 January 1807 – 12 February 1880) was an English Unitarian minister and author.

== Life ==
He was born at Heaton Norris, Lancashire, on 9 January 1807. His father, Edward Higginson the elder (b. 20 March 1781, d. 24 May 1832), was a Unitarian minister and schoolmaster at Stockport (1801–10) and Derby (1811–31), who married as his first wife Sarah Marshall (d. 10 August 1827, aged 45) of Loughborough, Leicestershire. He was educated in his father's school, and in September 1823 entered Manchester College, York, as a divinity student.

In August 1828 Higginson settled as minister of Bowl Alley Lane Chapel, Kingston upon Hull. From 1829 he also taught a school. He removed in 1846 to Westgate Chapel, Wakefield, West Riding, taking his school with him. In 1858 he became minister of High Street Chapel, Swansea, Glamorganshire, a position which he resigned because of failing health in 1876. While at Swansea he assisted in the tutorial work of Carmarthen College, and at the end of 1875 was offered the principalship. From 1877 to 1879 he was president of the Royal Institute of South Wales.

Higginson was a conservative among Unitarian scholars, his theological position being similar to that of Samuel Bache, who married his sister. He died at Swansea on 12 February 1880.

== Works ==
Higginson published, with sermons and tracts:

- Orthodoxy and Unbelief, &c., 1832.
- The Sacrifice of Christ, &c., Hull, 1833; 2nd edition, 1848.
- Christ Imitable, or, The Religious Value of Christ's Proper Humanity, 1837.
- The Spirit of the Bible, &c., 1853–5, 2 vols.; 2nd edition, 1863.
- Astro-Theology, &c., 1855. This was a contribution to the debate of the time on cosmic pluralism, involving also David Brewster, Baden Powell, Thomas Collins Simon, and William Whewell.
- Six Essays on Inspiration, &c., 1856.
- The Morals of Belief, &c., 1860.
- An English grammar, specially intended for classical schools, London: Longman, Green. 1864
- A Short Memoir of the Rev. R. B. Aspland, &c., 1869.
- A Catechism without Questions, &c. [1869?].
- Ecce Messias, 1871.
- With his wife he published The Fine Arts in Italy, 1859, a translation from the French of Athanase Josué Coquerel.

Higginson's preaching was not popular, but his Spirit of the Bible was widely read. He contributed theological and critical articles to the Christian Reformer, edited by his friend Robert Brook Aspland; in 1857 and 1858 he wrote anonymously there a series of semi-autobiographical sketches, under the title A Minister's Retrospect; from 1876 he contributed to the Christian Life edited by Robert Spears.

== Family ==
Higginson married first, on 25 December 1839, Lydia (d. 8 Feb. 1856, aged 42), youngest daughter of Flower Humble of Newcastle upon Tyne, and adopted by Samuel Shore; secondly, on 5 July 1857, Emily, daughter of George Thomas of Carmarthen, and left children.

== See also ==
- Astrotheology

== Notes ==
Attribution

This article incorporates text from a publication now in the public domain: Stephen, Leslie; Lee, Sidney, eds. (1891). "Higginson, Edward". Dictionary of National Biography. Vol. 26. London: Smith, Elder & Co.
