= William Guy =

British statistician

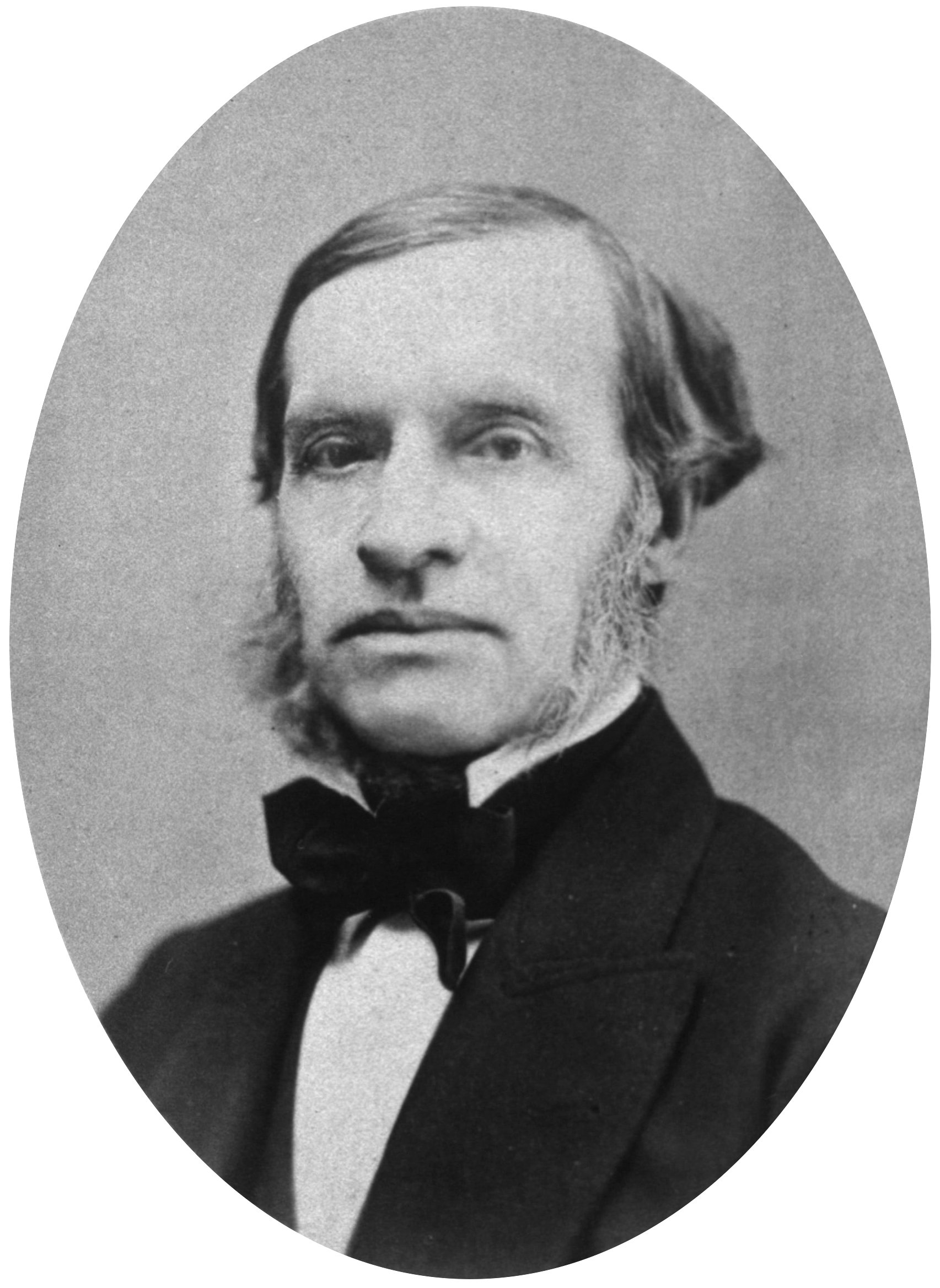
William Augustus Guy

William Augustus Guy (13 June 1810 – 10 September 1885) was a British physician and medical statistician.

== Life ==
He was born in Chichester and educated at Christ's Hospital and Guy's Hospital; he then studied at the University of Heidelberg and the University of Paris before getting a Bachelor of Medicine degree from the University of Cambridge, 1837.

In 1842, he was appointed professor of forensic medicine at King's College London and assistant physician at King's College Hospital, 1842; he was dean of the faculty of medicine, 1846–58. He also served as Medical Superintendent at Millbank Prison from 1859 to 1869, acting as a semi-official government advisor on prison health, diet and hygiene.

He edited the Journal of the Statistical Society of London (now the Royal Statistical Society), 1852–6 and was its president, 1873–5. The Society still presents the Guy Medals (in gold, silver and bronze) in his memory.

He was vice-president of the Royal Society, 1876–7, and Croonian (1860) and Lumleian (1868) lecturer, and Harveian (1875) orator at the Royal College of Physicians.

He was a founder of the Health of Towns Association and a member of the Commission on Penal Servitude and Criminal Lunacy.

== Works ==
Guy's Principles of Forensic Medicine, first published in 1844, became a standard work; the fourth and later editions were edited by Dr. David Ferrier. Other major works were:

- R. Hooper's Physician's Vade-Mecum; enlarged and improved by W.A.G., (1842 and many subsequent editions). Based on the work by Robert Hooper.
- T. Walker's Original, edited with additions by W.A.G. 1875; another edition 1885. Based on the publication The Original by Thomas Walker.
- Public Health; a Popular Introduction to Sanitary Science, pt. i. 1870; pt. ii. 1874.
- The Factors of the Unsound Mind, with special reference to the Plea of Insanity in Criminal Cases, 1881.
- John Howard's Winter's Journey, 1882.

Guy published lectures, and contributed papers to the Statistical Society, including the Influence of Employments on Health, The Duration of Life among different Classes, Temperance and its relation to Mortality, The Mortality of London Hospitals, Prison Dietaries, and John Howard's True Place in History.
