= Thomas Cooper (academic) =

American politician (1759–1839)

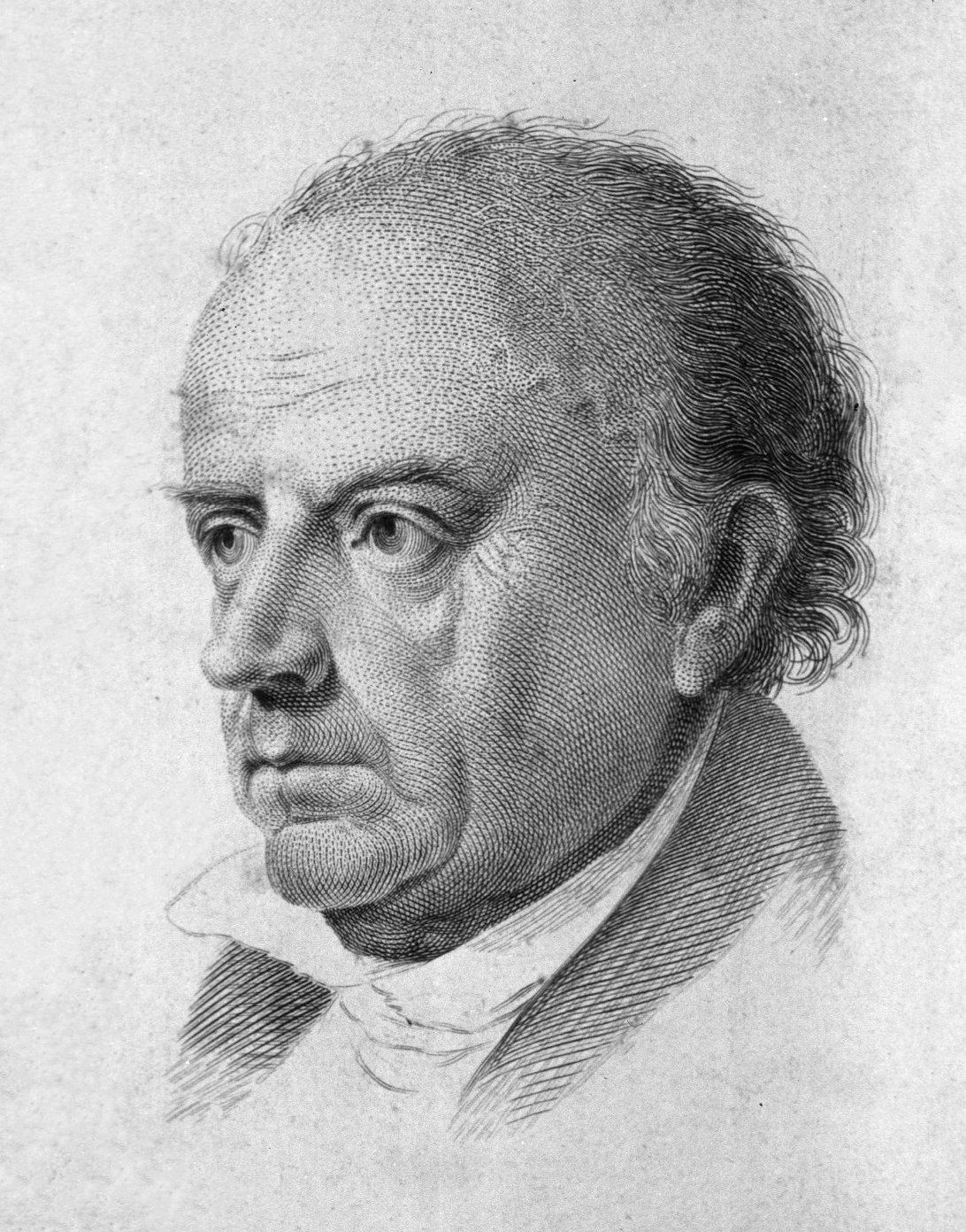
- Born: October 22, 1759; London
- Died: May 11, 1839; Columbia
- Education: University of Oxford
- Occupations: Chemist, jurist
- Employers: Dickinson College; University of Pennsylvania; University of South Carolina

Thomas Cooper (October 22, 1759 – May 11, 1839) was an Anglo-American economist, college president and political philosopher. Cooper was described by Thomas Jefferson as "one of the ablest men in America" and by John Adams as "a learned ingenious scientific and talented madcap." Dumas Malone stated that "modern scientific progress would have been impossible without the freedom of the mind which he championed throughout life." His ideas were taken very seriously in his own time: there were substantial reviews of his writings, and some late eighteenth-century critics of materialism directed their arguments against Cooper, rather than against the better-known Joseph Priestley.

Later in life, Cooper became an ardent and outspoken defender of slavery, and personally owned several slaves.

== Early life in Europe ==
Cooper was born in Westminster, England. In 1779, he matriculated at University College, Oxford, but did not graduate, supposedly refusing the religious test. He then qualified as a barrister being admitted to the Inner Temple in 1779 and called to the bar in 1787. He also studied medicine and the natural sciences. He travelled the Northern Circuit practising as a barrister from 1788 to 1790. At the same period he went into the calico printing business at Raikes near Bolton, Lancashire.

Cooper took on a prominent role in the reforming politics of the time. In early 1790 he took part in the campaign by Dissenters for greater religious tolerance. His approach was considered too extreme by some, and he shed much moderate support after a meeting in Cheshire. Edmund Burke mentioned Cooper in the House of Commons in March of that year. In October 1790 the Manchester Constitutional Society was set up, with Cooper, author of Letters on the Slave Trade (1787), and other members such as Thomas Walker, noted as radicals and abolitionists. The Constitutional Society had members in common with the Manchester Literary and Philosophical Society. But in July 1791 the Priestley Riots took place, driving Joseph Priestley from his home. The whole radical group resigned en masse, in 1791, when the Literary and Philosophical Society refused to send Priestley a message of sympathy.

He was elected a Member of the American Philosophical Society in 1802.

In the rapid developments stemming from the French Revolution, Cooper was sent to Paris in 1792 with James Watt Jr., by the Constitutional Society of Manchester. They travelled with an introduction from Walker to political circles through Jérôme Pétion de Villeneuve, and another to a man of science, Antoine Lavoisier, from Priestley. Cooper was for some purposes a representative of the British democratic clubs to those of France, but the situation on both sides of the Channel was by now becoming complex. The Manchester group favoured the Jacobins in the emerging split with the Girondins. Edmund Burke again censured Cooper in the House of Commons, and Cooper replied with a vehement pamphlet.

Cooper came to represent the Society for Constitutional Information (SCI) alone, in dealings with the Jacobins. The Whig Friends of the People took steps to exclude him, out of concerns that its membership should not overlap with that of the more radical SCI: Burke had called the Manchester reformist group "some of the worst men in the kingdom" to score a political point off Charles Grey, who had been instrumental in setting up the Friends in April 1792. While in France Cooper learned the process of obtaining chlorine from sea salt. He tried to apply this knowledge on his return to England to bleaching of textiles, but was unsuccessful.

By 1793, Cooper became disillusioned with the violent course of events in France. Both he and Watt later represented themselves as always favouring moderate elements (which is doubted now by scholars). But Cooper was in some danger of prosecution at home because of his views. He ruled out France as a destination, and made a preliminary journey to the United States in early 1794.

== First years in the United States ==
Cooper came to a decision, and emigrated to America with Joseph Priestley later in 1794. He began the practice of law in Northumberland County, Pennsylvania. Like his friend Priestley, who was then also living in Northumberland, he sympathized with the Jeffersonian Republicans, and took part in the agitation against the Alien and Sedition Acts.

On 26 October 1799, the Reading, Pennsylvania Advertiser published a strong attack he wrote against President John Adams. This led to his being tried for libel under the Sedition Act, and he was sentenced to six months' imprisonment, with a fine of $400. It was during this trial that Cooper stated that he knew the king of England could do no wrong, "but I did not know till now that the President of the United States had the same attribute."

In 1806, Cooper was appointed a land commissioner and succeeded in overcoming the difficulties with the Connecticut claimants in Luzerne county. That year he was also appointed president-judge of the Fourth District of Pennsylvania in 1806. In 1811, having become obnoxious to the members of his own party, he was removed from his position as judge on a charge of arbitrary conduct.

== Academic leader ==
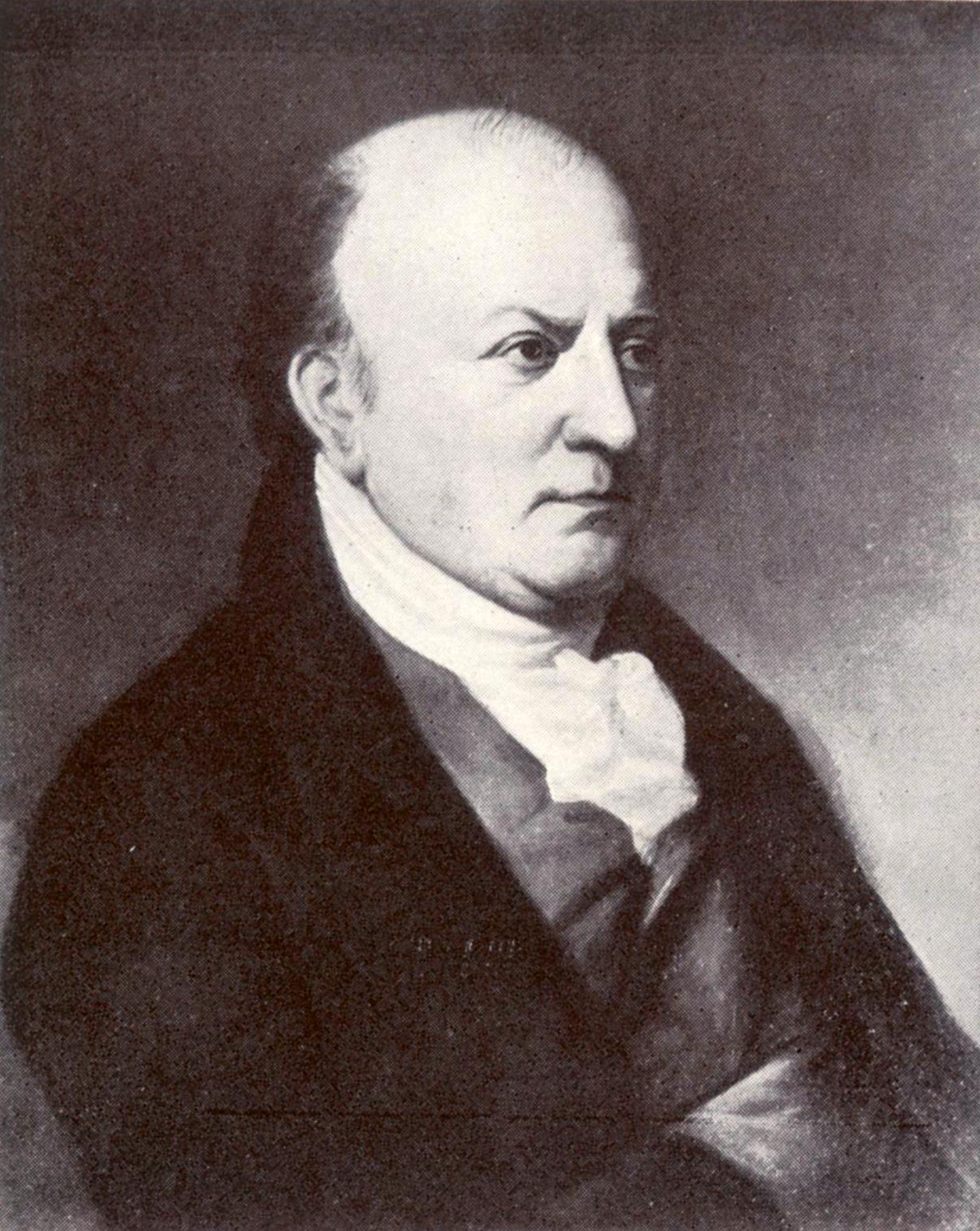
Thomas Cooper

Like Priestley, Cooper was very highly esteemed by Thomas Jefferson, who secured for him the appointment as first professor of natural science and law in the University of Virginia – a position which Cooper was forced to resign under the fierce attack made on him by the Virginia clergy. He later served as the chair of chemistry at Dickinson College in Carlisle, Pennsylvania (1811–1814) and at the University of Pennsylvania (1818–1819).

He became a professor of chemistry at South Carolina College (now the University of South Carolina) in 1819. Later he would also provide instruction in political economics. In 1820, he became acting president of this institution and was president from 1821 until 1833, when he resigned owing to the opposition within the state to his liberal religious views. In December 1834, owing to continued opposition, he resigned his professorship. Though he became increasingly controversial during his tenure as president, he was very popular with his students. Most of them came to his defense in the years of 1831–33, when Cooper was frequently challenged by the state legislature. Although many students disagreed with Cooper's philosophies, they liked the man personally.

== Views on government ==
Upon his arrival in America, Cooper had a positive outlook towards the country saying he preferred America because, "There is little fault to find with the government of America, either in principle or in practice... we have no animosities about religion; it is a subject about which no questions are asked... the present irritation of men's minds in Great Britain, and the discordant state of society on political grounds is not known there. The government is the government of the people and for the people". By 1831 his perspective had changed: "In no other country is the wise toleration established by law, so complete as in this. But in no country whatever is a spirit of persecution for mere opinions, more prevalent than in the United States of America. It is a country most tolerant in theory, and most bigoted in practice", not that this made him feel obliged to return to Mother England.

He was a born agitator. In 1832, he had been formally tried for infidelity. Before his college classes, in public lectures, and in numerous pamphlets, he constantly preached the doctrine of free trade, and tried to show that the protective system was especially burdensome to the South. His remedy was state action. Each state, he contended, was a sovereign power and was in duty bound to protest against the tyrannical acts of the Federal government.

Cooper was a relentless campaigner for political freedom. He believed freedom of speech was the most fundamental of those freedoms and that America had major improvements to make in this area: "the value of free discussion is not yet appreciated as it ought to be in these United States". He blamed the clergy in particular for this state of affairs: "the clergy of this country...are united in persecuting every man who calls in question any of their metaphysical opinions, or who hints at their views of ambition and aggrandizement". Not surprisingly, the evangelical Charles Colcock Jones, who was a missionary to slaves as well as a professor at Columbia Theological Seminary, was unimpressed with Cooper. Jones called him "the Father" of the "infidel Party" in South Carolina. "That old man," he wrote, "has done this state more evil than fifty years can remove. He has a world of iniquity to answer for in poisoning the State with his infidel principles."

== Nullification ==
Cooper was at the center of the nullification movement and taught South Carolina about the dangers of consolidation. In 1827, as the tariff controversy grew, Cooper publicly questioned the benefit of the Union. In a speech, he described the South as the perennial loser in an "unequal alliance." Cooper predicted that South Carolina would in the near future "be compelled to calculate the value of our union." The idea that the South should withdraw "received its first extensive advertising as a result of that speech."

He exercised considerable influence in preparing the people of South Carolina for nullification and secession; in fact he preceded Calhoun in advocating a practical application of the state sovereignty principle. By nature of being an adamant advocate of states' rights was in favor of Interposition. Cooper was one of the most vocal supporters of secession. Cooper's political views made him enemies, and his religious views made even more.

== Views on slavery ==
Cooper became increasingly pro-slavery over the course of his life. In 1787, Cooper authored Letters on the Slave Trade, attacking the Atlantic slave trade. In the mid to late 1780s Cooper fought passionately against "that infamous and impolitic traffic". He wrote that "negroes are men; susceptible of the same cultivation with ourselves", claimed that "as Englishmen, the blood of the murdered African is upon us, and upon our children, and in some day of retribution he will feel it, who will not assist to wash off the stain".

After moving to America, Cooper's views began to shift. After moving to South Carolina in 1819, he disavowed his previous anti-slavery views and purchased several enslaved families and began to defend slavery on Benthamist utilitarian grounds. In an 1826 essay, he expressed his doubts that "in South Carolina or Georgia... the rich lands could be cultivated without slave labour".

Cooper saw Africans as morally and intellectually inferior and believed they were happy to be provided for within the context of slavery. In an 1826 essay, Cooper wrote that the "emancipation of the Slaves, would surely convert them into idle and useless vagabonds, and thieves; as every Southern man conversant with negro habits and propensities well knows". Later that year, Cooper wrote in a private letter that "I do not say the blacks are a distinct species, but I have not the slightest doubt of their being an inferior variety of the human species; and not capable of the same improvement as the whites."

The 1830 census lists the Cooper household as containing eight enslaved persons.

== Philosophy ==
In addition to Thomas Jefferson, he was friends with James Madison and several Governors of South Carolina. As a philosopher he was a follower of David Hartley, Erasmus Darwin, Priestley, and François-Joseph-Victor Broussais; he was a physiological materialist, and a severe critic of Scottish metaphysics.

== Later years ==
The last years of his life were spent in preparing an edition of the Statutes at Large of the state, which was completed by David James McCord (1797–1855) and published in ten volumes (1836–1841). Cooper died in Columbia on the 11th of May 1839. He is interred in the churchyard at Trinity Episcopal Church in Columbia, South Carolina.

== Works ==
- Letters on the Slave-Trade (London, 1787)
- Tracts, Ethical, Theological, and Political (1790)
- Information concerning America (1790)
- Political Essays (Northumberland PA, 1799) [Two of the essays are written by Elizabeth Priestley née Ryland]
- Account of the Trial of Thomas Cooper, of Northumberland (Philadelphia, 1800)
- The Bankrupt Law of America Compared with that of England (1801)
- Introductory Lecture at Carlisle College (1812)
- An English Version of the Institutes of Justinian (1812)
- The Emporium of Arts and Sciences (editor of two of the five volumes, Philadelphia, 1812–1814)
- Thomas Thomson, System of Chemistry (editor, 4 vols., Philadelphia, 1818)
- Tracts on Medical Jurisprudence (1819)
- Lectures on the Elements of Political Economy (Charleston, 1826)
- A Treatise on the Law of Libel (1830)
- Liberty of the Press (1830)
- Broussais, On Irritation and Insanity (translation printed with his own essays "The Scripture Doctrine of Materialism," "View of the Metaphysical and Physiological Arguments in favor of Materialism" and "Outline of the Doctrine of the Association of Ideas," 1831)

== Legacy ==
The University of South Carolina's primary library is named for Cooper and bestows an achievement award presented by the university's Thomas Cooper Society: the Thomas Cooper Medal for Distinction in the Arts and Sciences. In July 2021, the university's Presidential Commission on University History recommended removing Cooper's name from the library. Dickinson College formerly had a residence hall named for Cooper; this was renamed in early May 2020.

== Sources ==
- Anderson, P. R.; Fisch, M. H. (1939). Philosophy in America. pp. 247–71. OCLC 1634652.
- Conkin, Paul K. (1980). Prophets of Prosperity: America's First Political Economists. Indiana University Press. pp. 141–52. ISBN 9780253308436.
- Dorfman, Joseph (1946). The Economic Mind in American Civilization, vol. 2 (PDF). pp. 527–39. Archived (PDF) from the original on October 3, 2021.
- Hollis, Daniel Walker (1951). University of South Carolina, vol. 1. University of South Carolina Press. pp. 74–118. ISBN 9780872490321. OCLC 2134756.
- Wilson, J. G.; Fiske, J., eds. (1900). "Cooper, Thomas" . Appletons' Cyclopædia of American Biography. New York: D. Appleton.
