= Tommy Walker =

Tommy Walker may refer to:

== People ==
=== Sports ===
- Tommy Walker (winger) (fl. 1891–1893), English footballer (Port Vale)
- Tommy Walker (footballer, born 1903) (1903–?), Scottish footballer (Bradford City and Sheffield Wednesday)
- Tommy Walker (footballer, born 1915) (1915–1993), Scottish international football player and manager (Hearts, Chelsea)
- Tommy Walker (footballer, born 1923) (1923–2005), English footballer (Newcastle United and Oldham Athletic)
- Tommy Walker (footballer, born February 1952), English footballer (Stoke City and Burnley)
- Tommy Walker (footballer, born March 1952), Scottish footballer (Airdrieonians)
- Tommy Walker (footballer, born 1964), Scottish footballer (Ayr United, Dumbarton, Stranraer and Albion Rovers)

=== Other ===
- Tommy Walker (Australian politician) (1858–1932), in Western Australia
- Tommy Walker (events director) (1922–1986), American producer of live events
- Tommy Walker (worship leader), American composer and author
- Tommy Lee Walker (1934-1956), American man wrongfully executed for murder
- Poltpalingada Booboorowie (died 1901), known as Tommy Walker, Aboriginal personality in Adelaide

== Fictional characters ==
- Tommy Walker (Brothers & Sisters), played by Balthazar Getty
- Tommy Walker (The Who), from the album Tommy and its related musical media and film

== See also ==
- Thomas Walker (disambiguation)
