= A Dictionary of Arts and Sciences =

A Dictionary of Arts and Sciences was published in London in 1806–7. It was originally supposed to be edited by Dr. George Gregory, Prebendary of St. Paul's. However, Gregory was too involved in his clerical affairs, so most of the material was written by an anonymous hack writer, Jeremiah Joyce. As it would turn out, another encyclopedia meant to compete with the Dictionary, the British Encyclopedia, or Dictionary of Arts and Sciences which was supposedly edited by William Nicholson, was also written mostly by an anonymous hack writer, who turned out to be the same man.

The Dictionary itself was published in response to the Pantologia.
