= Conger (syndicate) =

Syndicate of booksellers

The conger was a system common in bookselling in 18th- and early 19th-century England, for financing the printing of a book. The term referred to a syndicate of booksellers, mostly in London, who bought shares to finance the book's printing. Each member agreed to take so many copies for sale themselves, and the final profit was split in proportion to the members' initial financial input. Their names all appeared on the title pages as co-publishers, though one of the major publishing houses usually took the lead in setting the deal up.

Prior to the Statute of Anne, the Conger (often seen capitalized) also had an effect on copyright. After the printing became common, publishers took the position that having purchased a work from an author, the right to control its publication continued permanently. Courts supported the claim via precedent, until the Statute was passed early in the 18th century, after which it was law that literary works went into the public domain after a fixed time set by statute.

This system seems to have been mostly used in the financing of major projects – for example, multi-volume works such as encyclopedias. Shares were often subdivided and re-sold, so the actual balance of ownership became very convoluted.

The Conger system was also, in effect, a wholesaling system which controlled the distribution of popular books. The Conger syndicate met regularly from the 1690s, holding private auctions at which books could be bought wholesale for resale either to the public or to regional booksellers. The system handled over 170,000 books, to the value of nearly £37,000, between 1695 and 1705.
