= Thomas Walker (author) =

English barrister, police magistrate and author (1784–1836)

Thomas Walker (1784–1836) was an English barrister, police magistrate and author. He is now remembered for his one-man periodical, The Original.

== Life ==
He was the son of Thomas Walker (1749–1817) the radical, born at Barlow Hall, Chorlton-cum-Hardy, near Manchester, on 10 October 1784. His father was a Manchester cotton merchant.

Walker went to Trinity College, Cambridge, and graduated B.A. in 1808 and M.A. in 1811. He was called to the bar at the Inner Temple on 8 May 1812. After the death of his father, he lived for some years at Longford Hall, Stretford, taking part in township affairs, and tackling pauperism. In 1829 he was appointed a police magistrate at the Lambeth Street court. On 20 May 1835 he began the publication of The Original, and continued it weekly until the following 2 December.

Walker died unmarried at Brussels on 20 January 1836, and was buried in the cemetery there. A tablet to his memory was placed in St Mary's, Whitechapel.

== Works ==
In 1826 Walker published Observations on the Nature, Extent, and Effects of Pauperism, and on the Means of reducing it (2nd edit. 1831), and in 1834 Suggestions for a Constitutional and Efficient Reform in Parochial Government. He wrote from a Malthusian point of view.

The Original was intended to raise "the national tone in whatever concerns us socially or individually", and comprised a collection of Walker's thoughts on many subjects. Its writing on health and gastronomy were most appreciated. Many later editions of The Original were published, with a reprint in 1850:

- 1874, with memoirs of the two Walkers by William Blanchard Jerrold;
- 1875, as edited by William Augustus Guy;
- 1887, one with an introduction by Henry Morley, and another "arranged on a new plan".

A selection, entitled The Art of Dining and of attaining High Health, was printed at Philadelphia in 1837; and another selection, by Felix Summerley (Sir Henry Cole), was published in 1881 as Aristology, or the Art of Dining.

== Notes ==
Attribution

This article incorporates text from a publication now in the public domain: Lee, Sidney, ed. (1899). "Walker, Thomas (1784-1836)". Dictionary of National Biography. Vol. 59. London: Smith, Elder & Co.
