= Thomas Walker (merchant) =

English cotton merchant and political radical

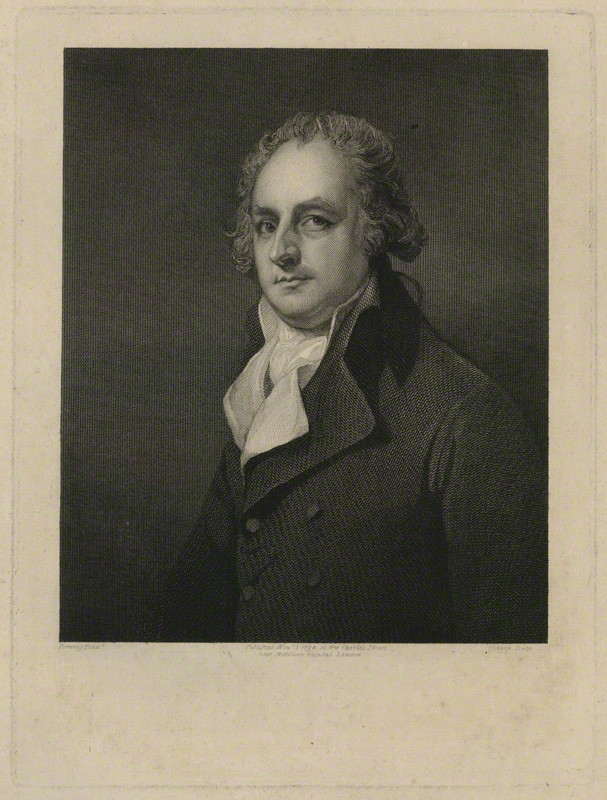
Thomas Walker, 1794 engraving

Thomas Walker (1749–1817) was an English cotton merchant and political radical.

== Life ==
He was the son of Thomas Walker, a merchant in Bristol who moved to Manchester. An early influence was the teaching of James Burgh. He became a Manchester cotton merchant himself. He had a town house and warehouse on South Parade, adjacent to St Mary's Church, Manchester, and a country place at Barlow Hall, rented from William Egerton.

=== Business campaigns ===
In 1784 Walker led the successful local opposition to William Pitt's fustian tax. With Thomas Richardson, he testified to the Board of Trade committee in London in January 1785. After some confusion during the spring, the House of Commons voted to repeal the tax in April, and the Manchester men returned north as heroes. The same year he founded the General Chamber of Manufactures, set up to lobby against Pitt's measures on trade with Ireland.

In 1787 Walker opposed the Eden Treaty, a divisive position. In 1788, at a meeting of fustian manufacturers and calico printers about the East India Company, Robert Peel spoke, and the unpopular Walker clashed physically with his brother Laurence.

=== Connections ===
Walker was well connected, through business, religious, political and family networks. Himself an Anglican of latitudinarian views, he supported the campaign against the religious disabilities of dissenters, and was a founder member of the Unitarian Society set up by Theophilus Lindsey. He took to heart comments of John Jebb that Pitt, after Lord North, was the most dangerous politician in the country. He married into the Shore family of Sheffield: Samuel Shore (1738–1828), his brother-in-law, was an ironmaster, dissenter, and activist of the Yorkshire Association.

Among his friends and correspondents were Charles James Fox, the leading Whig Lord Derby, John Horne Tooke and Thomas Paine. He took on as apprentices the sons of both Joseph Priestley and James Watt; other business connections were with Matthew Boulton and Josiah Wedgwood. At the Manchester Literary and Philosophical Society he associated with like-minded men: John Ferriar the physician, Joseph Collier the surgeon, Samuel Jackson the merchant, and Thomas Cooper the barrister.

=== Abolitionist ===
The Manchester committee against the slave trade was set up on 27 December 1787. Walker was the chairman, Samuel Jackson the secretary, and there were 29 other founder members. Over the next four years members, including Walker, then joined other committees, including that of the Manchester Infirmary.

A commission was given to James Anderson of Hermiston, who wrote Observations on Slavery (1789). In 1790 Walker and Cooper went to London, working with the abolitionists there to lobby Members of Parliament. Walker was a pivotal figure for Manchester abolitionism, took shares in the Sierra Leone Company, and was in touch with the London Abolition Committee. By 1792, 15 of the committee members had joined the Literary and Philosophical Society; they included Walker and Ferriar, George Lloyd the barrister, Thomas Barnes and Thomas Henry. The committee, however, had by then shed some Tory members, including the prominent Loyalist Nathan Crompton, and others remained as nominal supporters only.

There was also opposition, with Lawrence Peel taking a significant part in organising an anti-abolition petition. The Infirmary experienced a sharp dispute in the years 1788 to 1790, with reformers including Ferriar and Thomas Percival arguing for expansion, while conservative surgeons including Charles White defended the status quo. A meeting at Michaelmas 1790 saw Walker speak forcefully for expenditure on medical assistants. The measure passed, but William Roberts who was present took offence, and carried forward a vendetta.

=== Borough-reeve for 1790–1 ===
Partly by choice, Manchester in the 18th century, which by 1790 had a population of 75,000, lacked municipal structures beyond the legacy of the Middle Ages. It was not a parliamentary borough, meaning it avoided divisive national elections, as Walker's opponent Roberts had argued in 1788. The Tory establishment in Manchester, in particular the Peel family of manufacturers, grouped around the manorial institutions and Manchester collegiate church. The Whig and dissenter political leaders had little access to the manorial positions; the manor of Manchester ran in the family of the Mosley baronets, and in 1790 the title was held by a minor.

In October 1790 Walker was elected borough-reeve of Manchester. The electoral body was the jury of the court leet, a medieval survival summoned by the lord of the manor. The borough-reeve was the leading citizen of the town, and was elected with two Constables. The typical borough-reeve was a Tory merchant or textile manufacturer. The major power attached to the office was the calling of public meetings. Through deputy and special constables, the court leet also oversaw peacekeeping.

Walker was preceded in the annual post by Edward Place, and followed by Nathan Crompton. Place had called a public meeting on 3 February 1790, at which resolutions had been passed including one stating that Dissenter agitation should be viewed with "alarm". Nathan Crompton was a "Church and King" man.

=== Radical politician ===
Walker was also, with Thomas Cooper, dominant in Manchester radical politics. In 1790, while he was borough-reeve, Walker founded the Manchester Constitutional Society. He belonged to the Society for Constitutional Information and edited the Manchester Herald. It was founded by Cooper and Walker, as an alternative to the conservative Manchester Mercury run by Joseph Harrop, was abolitionist, and wrote positively about the French Revolution. It appeared from 31 March 1792, printed by Matthew Falkner and Samuel Birch, both Constitutional Society Members. Falkner had a printing house.

After the Priestley Riots of July 1791, the Manchester Literary and Philosophical Society was asked to send a message of support to Joseph Priestley, who had had to flee Birmingham, as had been done by the Derby Philosophical Society. The request was refused, however. On this, a group including Cooper and Walker resigned en masse, with James Watt junior, Joseph Priestley junior, Samuel Jackson and others. On 4 November 1791 Walker attended the Revolution Dinner at the London Tavern, with Priestley, Tom Paine, and Jérôme Pétion de Villeneuve. When in April 1792 Cooper and James Watt junior went to Paris, they were ostensibly travelling on business for Walker's firm. They carried a letter from Walker to Pétion, the mayor of the city, proclaiming a maturing English revolution.

=== Loyalist resistance ===
In September 1792 a large group of Manchester public house keepers banned meetings of the local reform societies; Walker reacted by holding the Constitutional Society and Manchester Reform Society meetings in his town house. The Manchester Constitutional Society was one of the parties to a joint address sent in November 1792 to the French Convention, the others being the London Corresponding Society, the Manchester Reformation Society, the Norwich Revolution Society and the Society of the Friends of the People.

Archibald Prentice's account of these events regards the formation of a "Church and King Club" in Manchester as a result of the rejection in 1790 of nonconformist pressure to relax religious tests. The Manchester Constitutional Club was a reaction to it: and besides Cooper and Walker, the members were James Darbishire, Thomas Kershaw, George Lloyd and George Philips. The Manchester Herald was set up in March 1792, because the Manchester Chronicle and Manchester Mercury had ceased to give space to radical views.

Walker's warehouse was attacked in December 1792 by a "Church and King" mob: he managed to drive them off. On Walker's published account, the violence that began on 10 December 1792 lasted for three nights, and occurred in four locations, with the constables not intervening. It affected his house, which was on South Parade; that of Joseph Collier; and that of Matthew Falkner, with the Manchester Herald office being broken up. It also was directed at William Gorse, of the Manchester Reformation Society, in Great Newton Street (in what is now the Northern Quarter). Richard Unite, the deputy constable, is considered to have connived at the rioting.

In August 1793 Joseph Priestley was under the impression that both Cooper and Walker would leave for America; in the event, Cooper went but Walker stayed in Manchester. Birch and Falkner left for America in spring of 1793, and the last issue of the Manchester Herald appeared on 23 March.

=== Treason trial ===
In 1794 Walker was prosecuted for treasonable conspiracy; but the evidence was found to be perjured, and the charge was abandoned. At the trial he was defended by Thomas Erskine.

Edward Law in 1793 was made king's sergeant and attorney-general for the County Palatine of Lancaster. He prosecuted Walker for conspiracy to overthrow the constitution. The case began with evidence gathered by the Rev. John Griffith, a Manchester magistrate. A chaplain of the Manchester Collegiate Church, who became a fellow there in November 1793, he was later criticised for his role in Walker's prosecution. Summer of 1793 saw rumours circulate in Manchester about Walker: words he had used against the king, armed men he was training. Griffith found an informer, Thomas Dunn, and investigated what evidence could be collected against Walker. On the basis of Dunn's testimony, Griffith issued an arrest warrant for Walker, on a treason charge.

At that point, Walker was in London: he asked his brother Richard and solicitor to make enquiries of Griffith, while he himself contacted Henry Dundas, the Home Secretary. Lesser figures in the reform societies were also proceeded against. The treason charge against Walker was dropped; but he was brought to trial on a seditious conspiracy charge in April 1794 in Lancaster, before Judge John Heath. This was a major case, with ten defendants (eight only in the dock) including Joseph Collier, and large legal teams. Edward Law led for the prosecution, with four juniors; Thomas Erskine for the defence had four other counsel also, including Felix Vaughan.

The jury heard testimony about the attack on Walker's warehouse, and his subsequent collecting of arms, which were later fired over the head of a crowd. Dunn on re-examination was found to be drunk, and his evidence on armed men was directly contradicted. Law gave up the case against Walker, and the jury acquitted him; Dunn was later convicted of perjury.

=== Later life ===
Walker withdrew from political activity after the trial, but in 1795 was a signatory to a petition criticising government measures, with other members of the anti-slavery committee including Samuel Greg, Lloyd and Percival. After a dormant period, the reform societies became more active again in 1796, and by 1797 Walker had again emerged as a local leader in Manchester.

In personal terms, Walker's radicalism cost him dear. The cotton and fustian business he ran failed. (The economic context was a pause in Manchester's growth, in the early years of the French Revolutionary Wars.) Felix Vaughan, who died in 1799, left Walker a property at Longford in Stretford (near Manchester), which became the family home. He died at Longford on 2 February 1817. He was buried at St Clement's church, Chorlton cum Hardy.

== Works ==
- A Review of Some of the Political Events which Have Occurred in Manchester, During the Last Five Years, 1794

== Family ==
Walker married Hannah, daughter of Samuel Shore, and brother of Samuel Shore (1738–1828). They had three sons and three daughters. The sons included Thomas Walker (1784–1836) the author, and Charles James Stanley the magistrate.

== Notes ==
Attribution

This article incorporates text from a publication now in the public domain: Lee, Sidney, ed. (1899). "Walker, Thomas (1784-1836)". Dictionary of National Biography. Vol. 59. London: Smith, Elder & Co.
