= James Watt, Jr =

British engineer, businessman and activist (1769–1848)

James Watt, Jr. FRS
- Born: 5 February 1769
- Died: 2 June 1848 (aged 79); Aston Hall, Warwickshire
- Occupations: Engineer; Businessman; Activist
- Years active: 45
- Father: James Watt

James Watt, Jr., FRS (5 February 1769 – 2 June 1848) was a British engineer, businessman and activist.

== Early life ==
He was born on 5 February 1769, the son of James Watt by his first wife Margaret Miller, and half-brother of Gregory Watt. He was educated at Winson Green near Birmingham, by the Rev. Henry Pickering. His father was unable to find a better school, though dissatisfied with his son's progress.

At age 15 Watt spent a year at the Bersham Ironworks of John Wilkinson; and then went to Geneva. There he lodged with Nicolas-Théodore de Saussure, and knew Marc-Auguste Pictet and Jean-André Deluc. Subsequently, he studied German in Eisenach.

== In Manchester ==
In 1788 Watt returned to England and a position in the textile trade in Manchester. Initially he worked at Taylor & Maxwell, makers of fustian, where Charles Taylor was a partner. Watt worked there in the counting-house. He was then employed by the Manchester radical Thomas Walker, changing jobs just before the Priestley riots of July 1791.

The Manchester Literary and Philosophical Society was just one of a number of intellectual groups in Manchester at that period: Walker, Watt, Thomas Cooper and Samuel Jackson were leaders in the discussion of liberal reform and the views of Adam Smith. Watt became secretary of the Society in 1790, with John Ferriar. At this point Watt's interests were rather broad: Jacob Joseph Winterl the Hungarian chemist, Christoph Meiners, the Dictionary of Chemistry started by James Keir.

It was through Cooper that Watt joined the Constitutional Society, and then went to work for Richard & Thomas Walker. Cooper, Jackson and Walker were radicals and abolitionists, prominent in founding the Manchester Constitutional Society in 1790. The whole radical group resigned en masse, in 1791, when the Literary and Philosophical Society refused to send a message of sympathy to Joseph Priestley, driven from his home in the riots.

== In France ==
Watt went to Paris on a sales trip in France with Cooper in March 1792, at the time of the French Revolution. In April they conveyed to the Jacobin Club a greeting from the Manchester Constitutional Club. There was a reply of 13 April, from Jean-Louis Carra. Almost immediately Watt was denounced in the British parliament, with Cooper and Walker, by Edmund Burke. His name became coupled with Joseph Priestley's. His activities in France, including taking part in pro-Jacobin demonstrations, would later complicate his return to Britain.

In Paris Watt used letters of introduction from Priestley. He met the chemists Antoine Lavoisier and Antoine François, comte de Fourcroy in particular, though the talk was all of politics. He encountered also William Wordsworth, who became a friend. Over the summer he had business discussions with Jean-Marie Roland, vicomte de la Platière. Tom Wedgwood came to visit.

At first Watt was in favour with the revolutionary leaders, and defended the September massacres. Later in 1792 Cooper and Watt became suspect as supporters of Jacques Pierre Brissot, and left for Italy. Watt remained in self-imposed exile, with a well-founded fear of legal procedures that might be taken against him. When prosecutions against Walker and Jackson failed, early in 1794, the shadow lifted, with high-level intervention by Matthew Boulton and a tacit agreement to curb his political activism probably assisting Watt's return.

== Later life ==
Returning to England in 1794, Watt gave up on plans of emigration to America: they had been very real in 1793, when Cooper was preparing to go, and Priestley was still encouraging him late in the following year. At that point Watt was watching closely the treason trials, in particular that of Thomas Hardy, about which he corresponded with Thomas Beddoes. Thomas Walker took heart from Hardy's acquittal by a jury, and felt able to speak out once more against the government.

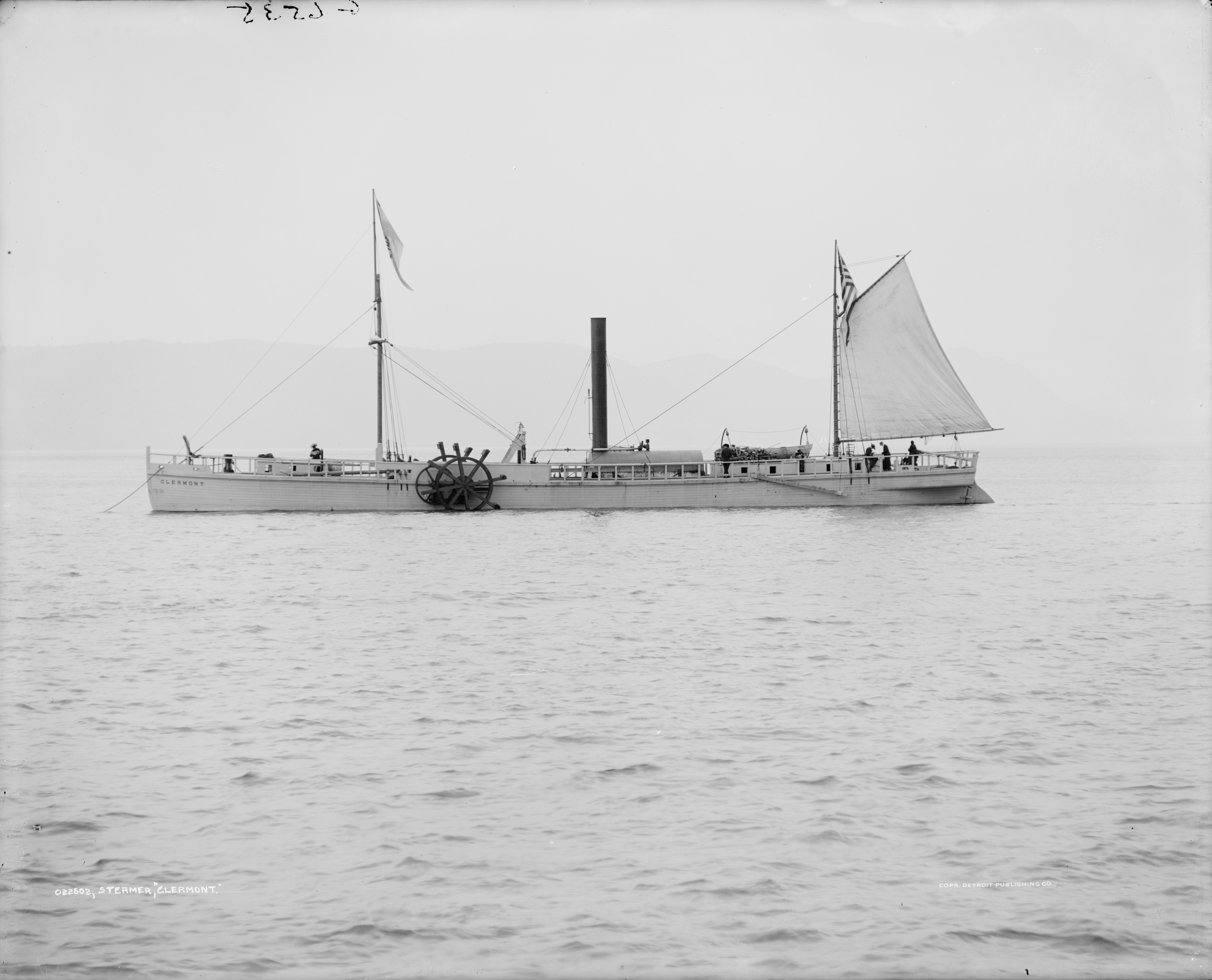
Replica of the North River Steamboat, 1909

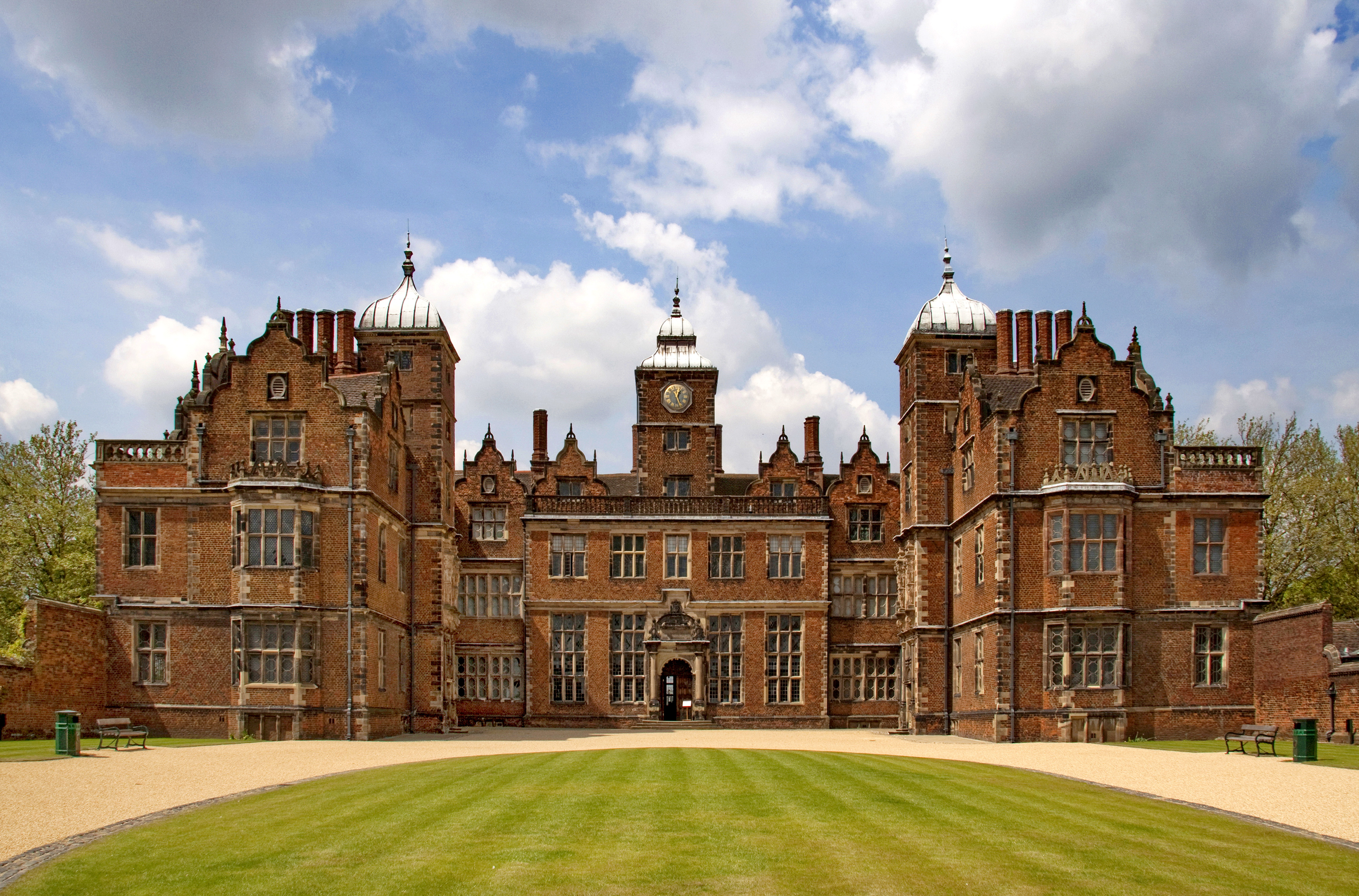
Aston Hall, Birmingham

Instead of leaving, Watt became a partner in the Soho Foundry firm of Boulton & Watt. Over time, he shared responsibility with Matthew Robinson Boulton for its management. Watt took on the daily operations and organisation of the Foundry, with Boulton being more concerned with planning. One problem was breaking into the steam engine market of the industrial north: Peter Ewart and Isaac Perrins had been tried as representatives, before the more satisfactory James Lawson was found. The younger generation of Watt and Boulton by the later 1790s had become serious adversaries of those firms who had reacted by infringing the company's patents in the north of England.

Like others in his firm and family, Watt gave enthusiastic support to the Pneumatic Institution of Beddoes. He circulated German contacts, Lorenz von Crell. and Friedrich Albrecht Carl Gren, about it. Some years later, Boulton & Watt were able to sell gases to an industrial market, rather than for medical purposes.

Watt later gave some technical assistance to Robert Fulton, providing in 1807 for Fulton the engine for North River Steamboat, which was the first steamboat to run on the Hudson River. Becoming more seriously interested in marine engines, he bought in 1817 the Caledonia of 102 tons, fitted her out with new engines, and went in her to Holland and up the River Rhine to Coblenz, the first steamship to leave an English port. On his return he made major improvements in marine steam engines.

Watt moved into Aston Hall, Warwickshire, in 1817 and was appointed High Sheriff of Warwickshire for 1829–30. After his father's death in 1819, Watt became a concerned guardian of his memory and reputation. He became controlling of biographical references, where they suggested Watt senior had depended on the help of others, and of Henry Brougham's epitaph for Francis Chantrey's memorial in Westminster Abbey. He was also assertive on behalf of his father's priority claim on the chemical composition of water, over that of Henry Cavendish. He was elected a Fellow of the Royal Society in 1820.

Watt died unmarried, at Aston Hall, on 2 June 1848. An Australian author claims that he fathered seven children with a Margaret Redfern, but birth and death records show that she lived in Belfast, and her husband was an Andrew Watt. She was the sister of William Redfern, and mother of William Redfern Watt.

== Notes ==
Attribution

This article incorporates text from a publication now in the public domain: Lee, Sidney, ed. (1899). "Watt, James (1736-1819)". Dictionary of National Biography. Vol. 60. London: Smith, Elder & Co.

Professional and academic associations
Preceded by John Ferriar	Secretary of the Manchester Literary and Philosophical Society; 1789–91	Succeeded by William Simmons
