= Revolution Society =

- Leader: Richard Price
- Founded: 1788
- Dissolved: 1792
- Succeeded by: London Corresponding Society
- Headquarters: London Tavern
- Ideology: Radicalism; Jacobinism
- Political position: Left-wing
- National affiliation: Radicals

The London Revolution Society was formed 1788, ostensibly to commemorate the centennial of the Glorious Revolution of 1688 and the landing of William III, and was one of several radical societies in Britain in the 1790s. Other similar Revolution Societies were formed in provincial cities such as Norwich, which rivalled Sheffield as the centre of English Jacobinism.

Many of the members of the London Revolution Society were also members of the Society for Constitutional Information (SCI), 1780–1794. Along with some Anglicans a large number of English Dissenters and Unitarians were at the centre of the Society including Richard Price, Joseph Priestley, Andrew Kippis, Abraham Rees, Theophilus Lindsey, Thomas Belsham, Thomas Brand Hollis and Peter Finch Martineau. At the time of the fall of the Bastille in July 1789, the London Revolution Society was the most vocal of the radical societies. The meeting place in 1789 was the London Tavern. The group became increasingly supportive of the French Revolution, then still in its initial stages. Their November 1789 address to the French National Assembly would inspire the creation of the first French Jacobin Club. The Society continued its activities in 1790–1792 but after 1792 the radical momentum shifted from the London Revolution Society back to the SCI and the London Corresponding Society (LCS) The LCS was arguably the most influential and the longest-surviving of the societies.

The London Revolution Society last met in 1792, as most of these societies went inactive after the conservative reaction in 1792–1794, when, following local sedition trials in 1792 and 1793, William Pitt the Younger initiated the 1794 Treason Trials, followed by the Seditious Meetings Act 1795.

== See also ==
- Radicalism (historical)
