= George Gregory (British writer) =

British writer, scholar and preacher

The Rev. George Gregory (14 April 1754 – 12 March 1808) was an English writer, scholar, and preacher in the 18th and early 19th-century Britain. He held a Doctor of Divinity degree.

== Life ==
The son of a clergyman, Gregory was born in Ireland but moved to Liverpool upon his father's death in 1766. He studied at the University of Edinburgh and was ordained in the Anglican Church in 1776. He served as a curate in Liverpool while also contributing to periodicals and magazines. He moved to London in 1782 where he was curate at St. Giles, Cripplegate. He went on to carry out the curacy and lectureship of St. Botolph's, the lectureship of St. Luke's, one of the weekly lectureships of St Antholin's, and a small prebend in St. Paul's, which he relinquished for the rectory of Stapleford in Hertfordshire. He occasionally preached at the Foundling Hospital.

He died suddenly after a brief illness on 12 March 1808. At the time of his death he held the positions of the Domestic Chaplain to the Bishop of Landaff, Prebendary of St. Paul's, Vicar of West Ham, and Lecturer at St. Giles.

== Works ==
Gregory is best known for his literary compilations and writings. In 1782–1783, he helped compile a book of excerpts from other authors called Beauties which sold well. His first original lengthy work, in 1785, was Essays, Historical and Moral and was published anonymously. The success of this work led to a second edition in 1788 in which he revealed his identity as the author of the first edition. In 1787, he published a volume of sermons. He is often cited for his translation of Bishop Robert Lowth's Lectures on the Sacred Poetry of the Hebrews, also published in 1787. He published numerous other scholarly and scientific works under his name and contributed to other writings and compilations but without credit.

=== Written ===
- Essays Historical and Moral (1785)
- The Life of Thomas Chatterton (1789)
- An History of the Christian Church From the Earliest Periods to the Present Time; (1795)
- The Economy of Nature Explained and Illustrated on the Principles of Modern Philosophy (1798)
  - Volume 1
  - Volume 2
  - Volume 3
- Elements of a Polite Education: Carefully Selected From the Letters of Philip Dormer Stanhope, Earl of Chesterfield to His Son (1800)
- A Dictionary of Arts and Sciences (1806)
  - Volume 1
  - Volume 2
  - Volume 3
- Letters on Literature, Taste, and Composition: Addressed to his Son (1808)
  - Volume 1
  - Volume 2
- Lectures on Experimental Philosophy, Astronomy, and Chemistry; Intended Chiefly for the use of Students and Young Persons (1820)
  - Volume 1
  - Volume 2

==== Contributed ====
- Lectures on the Sacred Poetry of the Hebrews (1808)
  - Volume 1
  - Volume 2
- The Young Preacher's Manual, or, A Collection of Treatises on Preaching; Comprising Brown's Address to Students in Divinity. Fenelon's Dialogues on the Eloquence of the Pulpit. Claude's Essay on the Composition of a Sermon, Abridged. Gregory on the Composition and Delivery of a Sermon. Reybaz on the Art of Preaching. With a List of Books (1819)
