= Thomas Walker (American politician) =

Alabama state legislator

Thomas Walker (December 15, 1850 – May 28, 1935) was enslaved before becoming a state legislator, county clerk, and deputy sheriff. He served in the Alabama House of Representatives.

Samuel M. Hill was his father. His mother was enslaved.

He gave sworn testimony in Bromberg v. Haralson.
