= George Smith Gibbes =

English physician and writer

Sir George Smith Gibbes M.D. (died 1851) was an English medical doctor and writer.

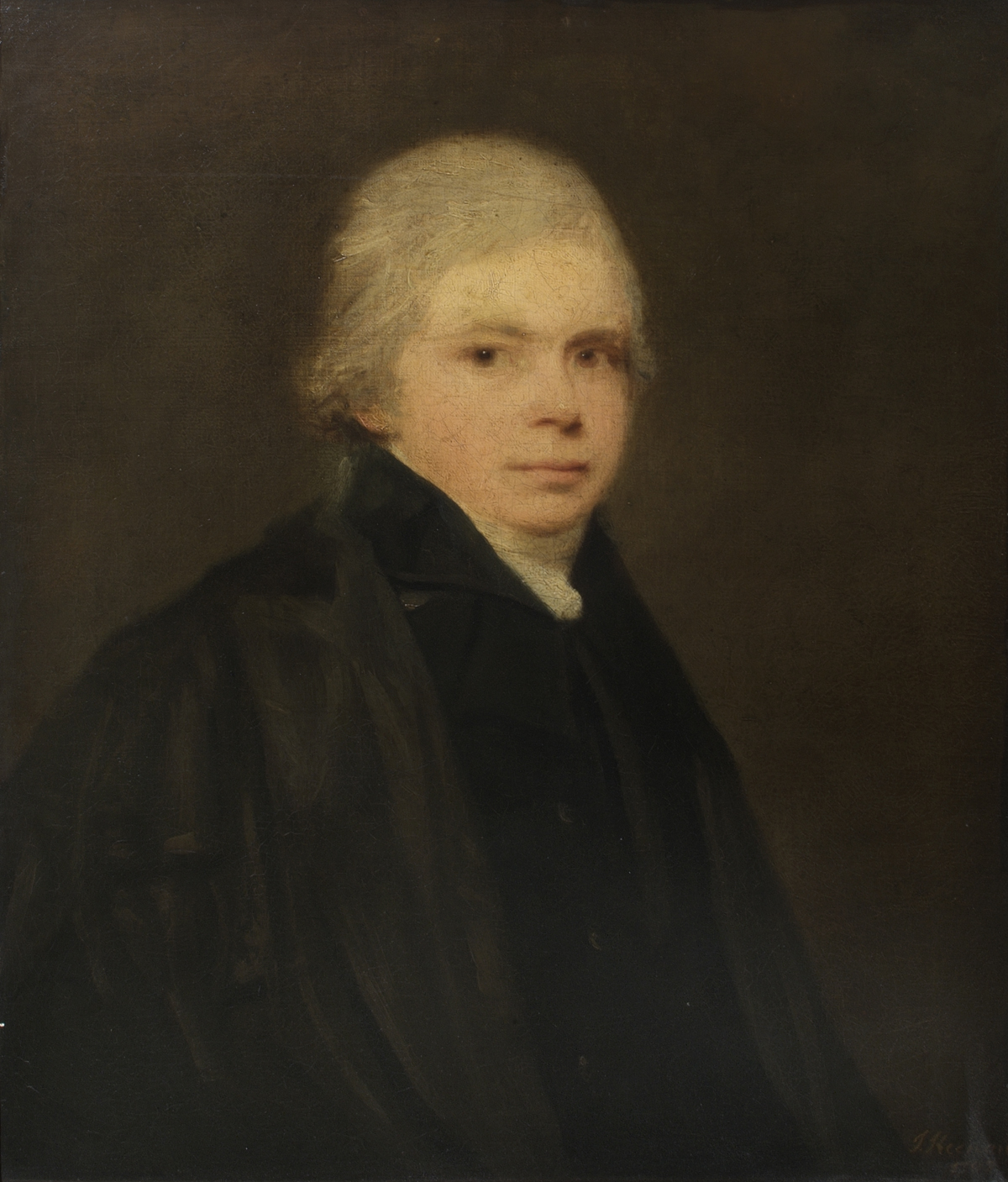
George Smith Gibbes, 1798 portrait

== Life ==
He was the son of George Gibbes, D.D., rector of Woodborough, Wiltshire. From the King Edward VI School, Southampton under Richard Mant, he went to Exeter College, Oxford, and graduated B.A. in 1792. He was elected a fellow of Magdalen College, and graduated M.B. in 1796 and M.D. in 1799.

Gibbes was elected a fellow of the Royal Society in 1796. He joined the Royal College of Physicians in 1803, and was made a fellow the year after; in 1817 he delivered the Harveian oration before the College. He practised at Bath, Somerset, where he was a prominent figure, and in 1804 he was elected physician to the Bath Hospital. Later he became physician extraordinary to Queen Charlotte, and in 1820 was knighted by George IV. He took part in municipal business at Bath, and was a member of the corporation until 1834.

Gibbes in 1835 gave up practice and went to live at Cheltenham. He died at Sidmouth on 23 June 1851, aged 80.

== Works ==
The main works published by Gibbes were the 1800 he published his Treatise on the Bath Waters (1800) with a second treatise (1803), and Pathological Inquiries, or an Attempt to Explain the Phenomena of Disease, Bath, 1818, a semi-popular if philosophical exposition of the principles of medicine. He wrote also:

- An essay in the Philosophical Transactions, 1794, on the conversion of muscle into a substance resembling spermaceti (pamphlet on same topic, Bath, 1796).
- A syllabus of a course of chemical lectures given at Bath, 1799.
- A Phlogistic Theory ingrafted upon M. Fourcroy's "Philosophy of Chemistry", pt. i., 1809, pp. 32, Bath.
- A address at the opening of the Bath Literary and Philosophical Institution, published 1825, pp. 15.

Gibbes was a fellow also of the Linnean Society, having communicated an account of the contents of a bone-cave on the north-west side of the Mendip Hills, one of the earliest explored bone-caves in England. To William Nicholson's Journal of Natural Philosophy he contributed a papers on the Bath waters and other chemical subject, and to Alexander Tilloch's Philosophical Magazine a "Description of the Diacatoptron".

== Family ==
He was twice married, first to a daughter of Edward Sealey of Bridgwater, who died in 1822; and secondly, in 1826, to Marianne, daughter of Captain T. Chapman, 23rd regiment.

== Notes ==
Attribution

This article incorporates text from a publication now in the public domain: Stephen, Leslie, ed. (1890). "Gibbes, George Smith". Dictionary of National Biography. Vol. 21. London: Smith, Elder & Co.
