= Friedrich Accum =

German chemist and popularizer of science (1769–1838)

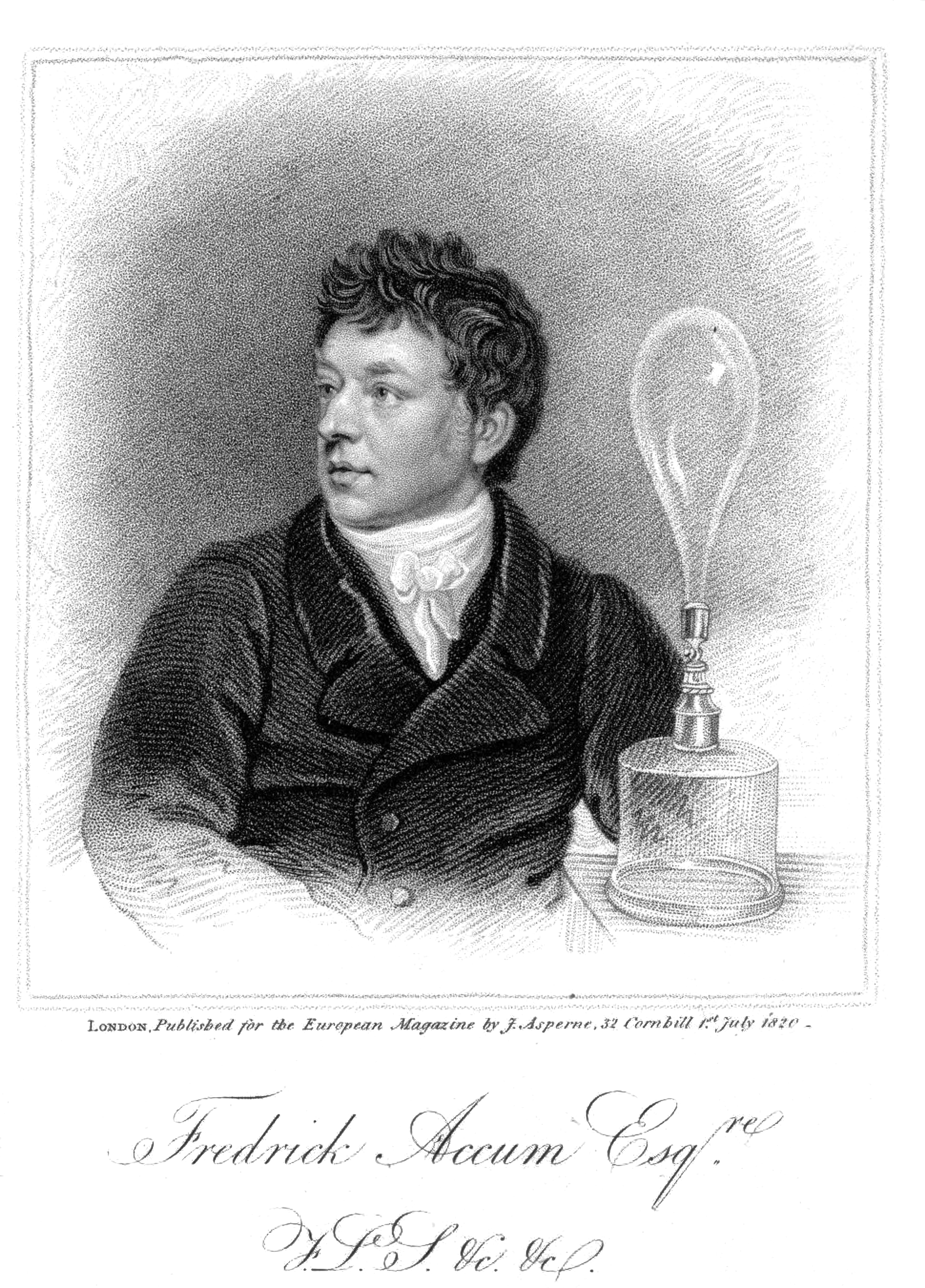
- From the European Magazine (1820) engraving by James Thomson.
- Born: 29 March 1769; Bückeburg, Schaumburg-Lippe
- Died: 28 June 1838 (aged 69); Berlin, German Confederation
- Occupation: Chemist
- Scientific career
- Workplaces: Royal Institution; Surrey Institution; Gas Light and Coke Company; Gewerbeinstitut; Bauakademie

Friedrich Christian Accum or Frederick Accum (29 March 1769 – 28 June 1838) was a German chemist, whose most important achievements included advances in the field of gas lighting, efforts to keep processed foods free from dangerous additives, and the promotion of interest in the science of chemistry to the general populace. From 1793 to 1821 Accum lived in London. Following an apprenticeship as an apothecary, he opened his own commercial laboratory enterprise. His business manufactured and sold a variety of chemicals and laboratory equipment. Accum, himself, gave fee-based public lectures in practical chemistry and collaborated with research efforts at numerous other institutes of science.

Intrigued by the work of Frederick Winsor, who had been championing the introduction of gas lighting in London, Accum too, became fascinated by this innovation. At the request of the Gas Light and Coke Company, he carried out many experiments in this novel field of inquiry. After a time of close working association with this company, he became a member of its board of directors in 1812. The company was charged with founding the first gasworks in London to supply gas lighting to both private and public areas. Accum was instrumental in the conception and design of this extremely successful gasworks.

The majority of Accum's publications were written in English. They were executed in a style that made them quite accessible. Many scientific contributions were brought forth through his writings, which were influential in the popularization of chemistry during this era. In 1820, Accum published A Treatise on Adulterations of Food and Culinary Poisons, in which he denounced the use of chemical additives to food. This work marked the beginning of an awareness of need for food safety oversight. Accum was the first person to tackle the subject and to reach a wide audience through his activities. His book, controversial at the time, found a wide audience and sold well. However, it threatened established practices within the food processing industry, earning him many enemies among the London food manufacturers. Accum left England after a lawsuit was brought against him. He lived out the rest of his life as a teacher at an industrial institution in Berlin.

== Life and work ==
=== Youth and education ===
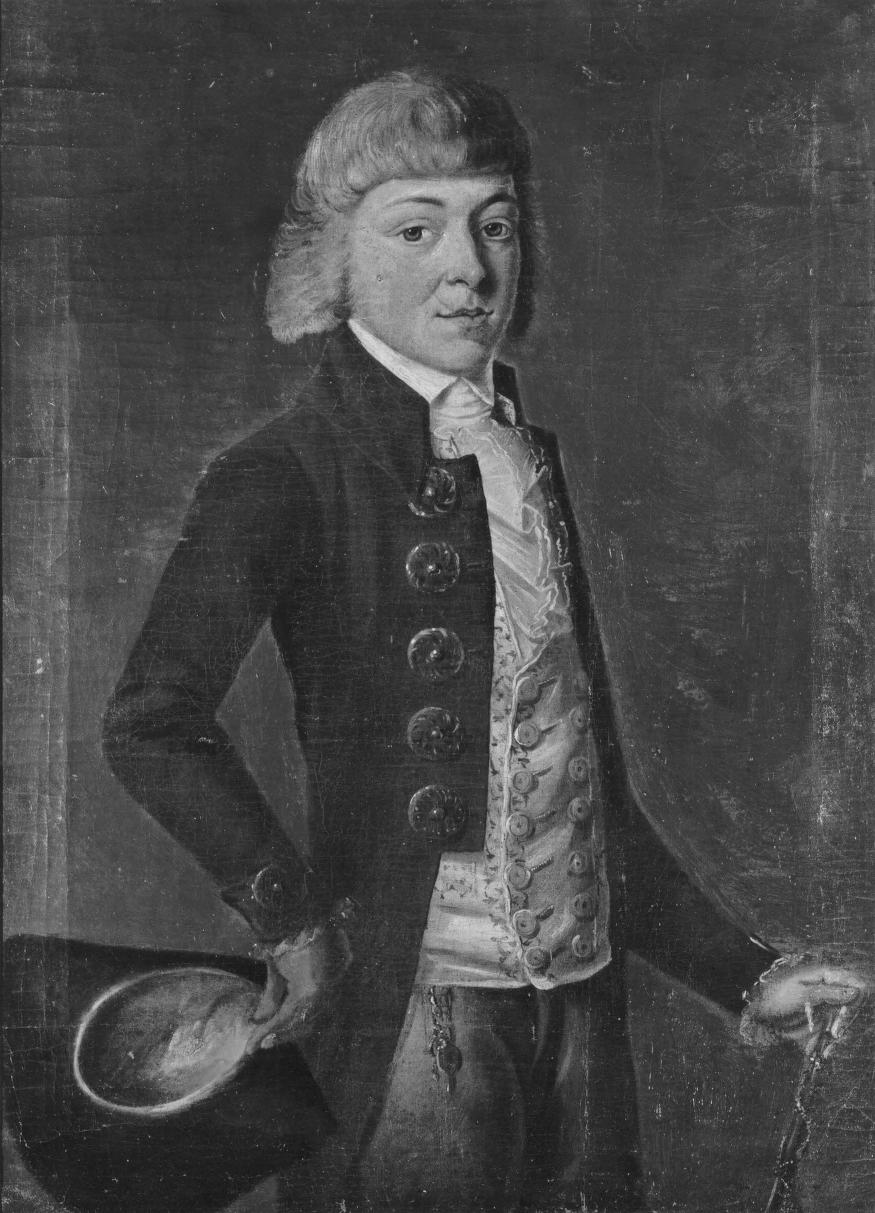
Friedrich Accum in his youth. Black and white reproduction of an oil painting by Accum's brother-in-law Wilhelm Strack.

Accum was born in Bückeburg, Schaumburg-Lippe, about 50 km (31 mi) west of Hanover. His father was from Vlotho, and had been in an infantry regiment in the service of Count Wilhelm von Schaumburg-Lippe. In 1755, Accum's father converted from Judaism to Protestant Christianity. Soon after, his father married Judith Berth dit La Motte in Bückeburg. Judith was the daughter of a hat maker, who lived in the French community in Berlin, and the granddaughter of a refugee who suffered under the Huguenot persecutions in France.

At the time of his conversion baptism, the senior Accum changed his name from Markus Herz to Christian Accum. In addition to choosing the name "Christian," Accum's father chose to emphasize his newly embraced religion by adopting the surname Accum, which derives from the Hebrew word "Akum," meaning "not-Jewish." It is not known whether he did this on his own initiative or because of pressure from his fiancee's family. After his marriage, Christian Accum opened his own soap-making shop in Bückeburg at his in-law's home. Nine years after his marriage to Judith, he received legal citizenship from the city.

Friedrich Accum attended the Bückeburg Gymnasium Adolfinum and additionally received private tutelage in the subjects of French and English. Following the conclusion of his studies, he finished an apprenticeship as an apothecary with the Brande family in Hanover, who were family friends. The Brandes also conducted business in London and were the apothecaries to the Hanoverian King of England, George III. As one of the leading centers for scientific research and industry at the close of the eighteenth century, London attracted the best and brightest minds of Europe.

=== The first year in London ===
After gaining experience as an assistant in the apothecary, Accum pursued scientific and medical studies at the School of Anatomy in Great Windmill Street in London. He became acquainted with the surgeon Anthony Carlisle (1768–1842) and the London chemist William Nicholson (1753–1815). In Mr. Nicholson's circulating journal, (Nicholson's Journal)

In the fall of the year 1799, a translation of Franz Carl Achard's ground-breaking work on the production of sugar from beets appeared in Nicholson's Journal. Until that time, sugar cane, which was grown overseas, was the only plant from which sugar could be derived. This information made possible the creation of a domestic sugar industry, and was greeted with great interest. A short time after the article's publication, Accum had samples of beet sugar sent from Berlin, and presented them to William Nicholson. This was the first time sugar derived from beets had ever been present in England. Following his careful analysis of both types of sugar, Nicholson published a detailed report in the January edition of his journal, stating that there was no appreciable difference in taste between the two.

=== Laboratory worker, merchant and private tutor ===
In 1800, Accum and his family changed residence in London from 17 Haymarket to 11 Old Compton Street. There he would live for the next twenty years. His family home also served as a school, an experimental laboratory and place he sold chemicals and scientific instruments. Accum's business cards of the time described his activities thus:

Mr Accum acquaints the Patrons and Amateurs of Chemistry that he continues to give private Courses of Lectures on Operative and Philosophical Chemistry, Practical Pharmacy and the Art of Analysis, as well as to take Resident Pupils in his House, and that he keeps constantly on sale in as pure a state as possible, all the Re-Agents and Articles of Research made use of in Experimental Chemistry, together with a complete Collection of Chemical Apparatus and Instruments calculated to Suit the conveniences of Different Purchasers.

For many years, Accum's establishment was the only significant institution in England that provided lectures on the theory of chemistry as well as training in laboratory practice. Amateurs were welcome to perform simple experiments on site to enhance their knowledge. Accum's teachings attracted various prominent students. These included the well-known London politician and later prime minister Lord Palmerston, the Duke of Bedford, and the Duke of Northumberland. Additionally, his laboratory was the first in Europe to be visited by students and scientists from the United States, among whom were Benjamin Silliman and William Dandridge Peck. When Silliman later became Professor of Chemistry at Yale College (precursor to Yale University) in New Haven, he ordered his first laboratory equipment from Accum in London. Accum's biographer, Charles Albert Browne, stated in his 1925 work that some of the older American colleges still had sales receipts from Accum's London business.

With the development of new laboratory apparatus, Accum positioned himself in the middle market range with respect to cost and usability. Accum developed portable laboratory kits, intended for farmers, for the analysis of soils and stones. With affordable prices ranging from three to eighty pounds sterling, these chests were the first truly portable laboratories.

=== Teacher and researcher ===
In March 1801, Frederick Accum was offered a position at the Royal Institution in Ablemarle Street, a research institute founded two years earlier by Count Rumford.

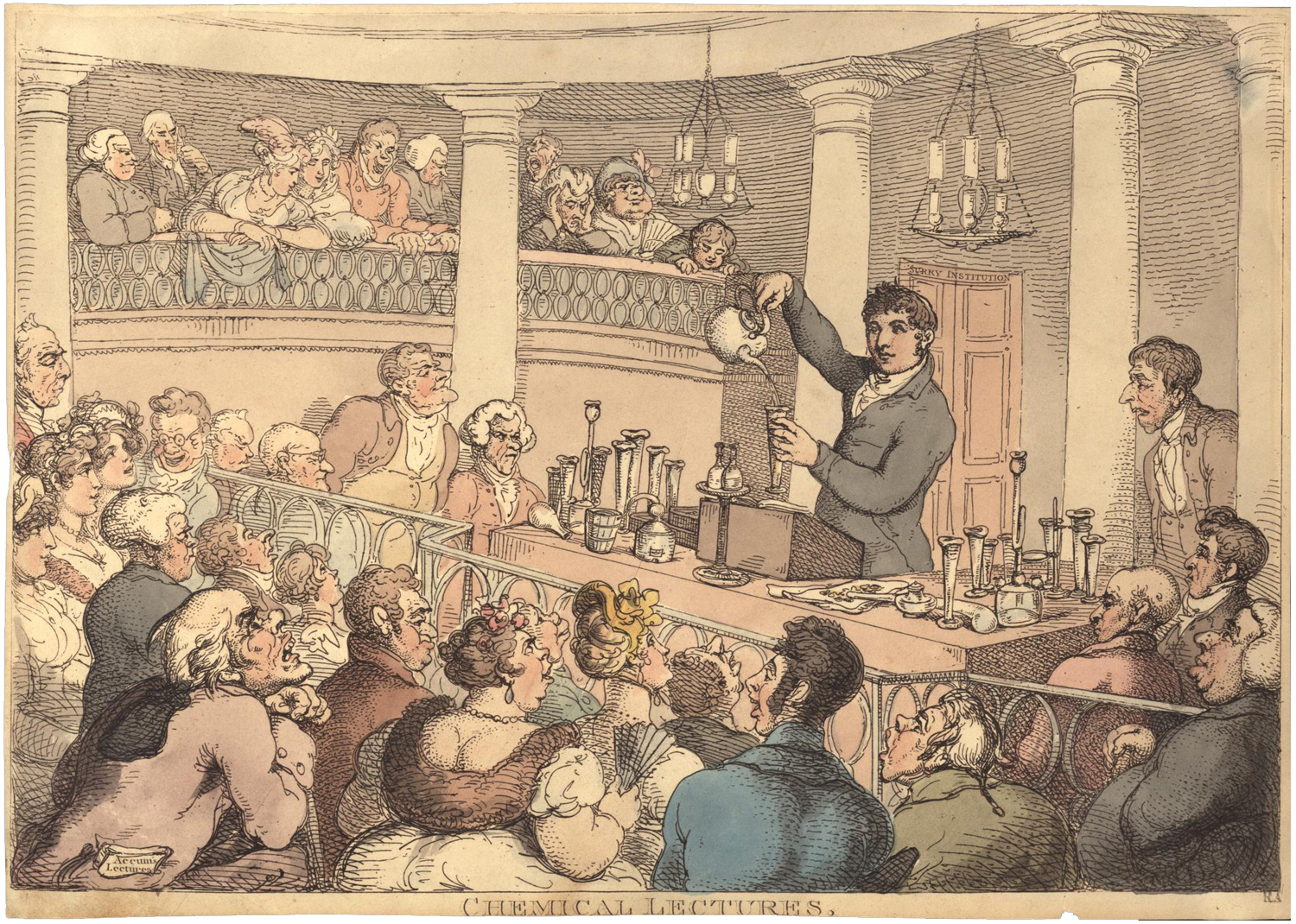
Chemical Lectures, contemporary caricature by Thomas Rowlandson. The inscription Surrey Institution on the door frame and the title Accum’s Lectures on the dust jacket held by the man sitting on the left under the corner both indicate that this image likely depicts Accum.

By 1803, Accum had published a series of articles in Nicholson's Journal, which discussed a number of subjects: investigating methods to determine the purity of medicines, determining the existence of benzoic acids in vanilla extract, observing the explosivity of sulphur-phosphorus mixtures. In 1803 one of Accum's most significant publications was completed. Cole, Accum's biographer states that this book, System of Theoretical and Practical Chemistry, "was the first text-book of general chemistry written in the English language to be based on Lavoisier's new principles; it is outstanding, also, in that it is written in a popular style, the subject matter being graduated as with a modern text-book."

Accum held his first lecture on chemistry and mineralogy in a small room in his house on Old Compton Street. His audience grew so rapidly that he soon had to rent the Medical Theatre on Cork Street. After resigning from the Royal Institution and taking a new position with the Surrey Institution, he continued with his popular lectures. An advertisement in The Times on 6 January 1809 indicates that Accum offered a course on mineralogy and the chemical analysis of metals every Wednesday evening.

His increasing interest in mineralogy at this time is also apparent from the titles of two books he authored between 1803 and 1809. The first was a two volume work that appeared in 1804 entitled A Practical Essay on the Analysis of Minerals, which was reissued in 1808 as A Manual of Analytical Mineralogy. In 1809 he published Analysis of a Course of Lectures on Mineralogy. Beginning in 1808, while at the Surrey Institution, Accum also published, a series of articles on the chemical properties and composition of mineral water in Alexander Tilloch's Philosophical Journal.

In 1811, when the Parisian saltpetre manufacturer Bernard Courtois made iodine for the first time from the kelp ash, his discovery was greeted with great interest by experts. Accum was among the first chemists in England to undertake experiments to isolate iodine. In two articles published in Tilloch's Philosophical Journal in January and February 1814, Accum described the iodine content of different kinds of seaweed and gave a detailed account of a process for iodine production.

=== Accum's role in the history of gaslight ===
Artificial lighting of any sort was largely absent during the industrial development of the late 18th and early 19th centuries. Using candles or oil lamps to illuminate a textile factory was costly, and economically unsound. With the advent of industrial means of production, not only were new textile halls physically larger, but they also had to be lit more brightly for longer periods of time. Driven by great demand, and made possible through Lavoisier's theoretical work regarding the role of oxygen in combustion, the end of the 18th century saw a continuous series of improvements in lighting technology.

The production of gases from coal had been noted by Henry Clayton. He shared this observation with Robert Boyle in a letter written in the 17th century. The letter was published in the Philosophical Transactions of the Royal Society in 1739. Clayton wrote:

I then got some Coal from one of the Pits nearest thereunto, which I distilled in a Retort in an open Fire. At first there came over only Phlegm, afterwards a black Oil, and then likewise a Spirit arose, which I could noways condense, but it forced my Lute, or broke my Glasses. Once, when it had forced the Lute, coming close thereto, in order to try to repair it, I observed that the Spirit which issued out caught Fire at the Flame of the Candle, and continued burning with Violence as it issued out, in a Stream, which I blew out, and lighted again, alternately, for several times.

Clayton's findings did not have any practical application until the end of the 18th century. The gas produced during the coking of coal was allowed to escape unused until William Murdoch began to promote coal gas as an illuminant. Other such experiments, though limited in depth, had been done by: George Dixon in 1780 in Cockfield, Jean-Pierre Minckelers in 1785 in Louvain, and Archibald Cochrane in 1787 at his estate Culross Abbey. The true prototypes for later gasworks were first constructed in 1802 at the Soho Foundry and in 1805 at George Lee's cotton mill in Salford close to Manchester. However innovative the new technology, it was met with great skepticism by many critics. As late as 1810 Murdock was asked in a committee of the House of Commons: "Do you mean to tell us that it will be possible to have a light without a wick?" Not until the second decade of the 19th century did gaslight spread from industrial mills to urban street lighting and domestic lighting. Accum played a crucial role in this unfolding revolution.

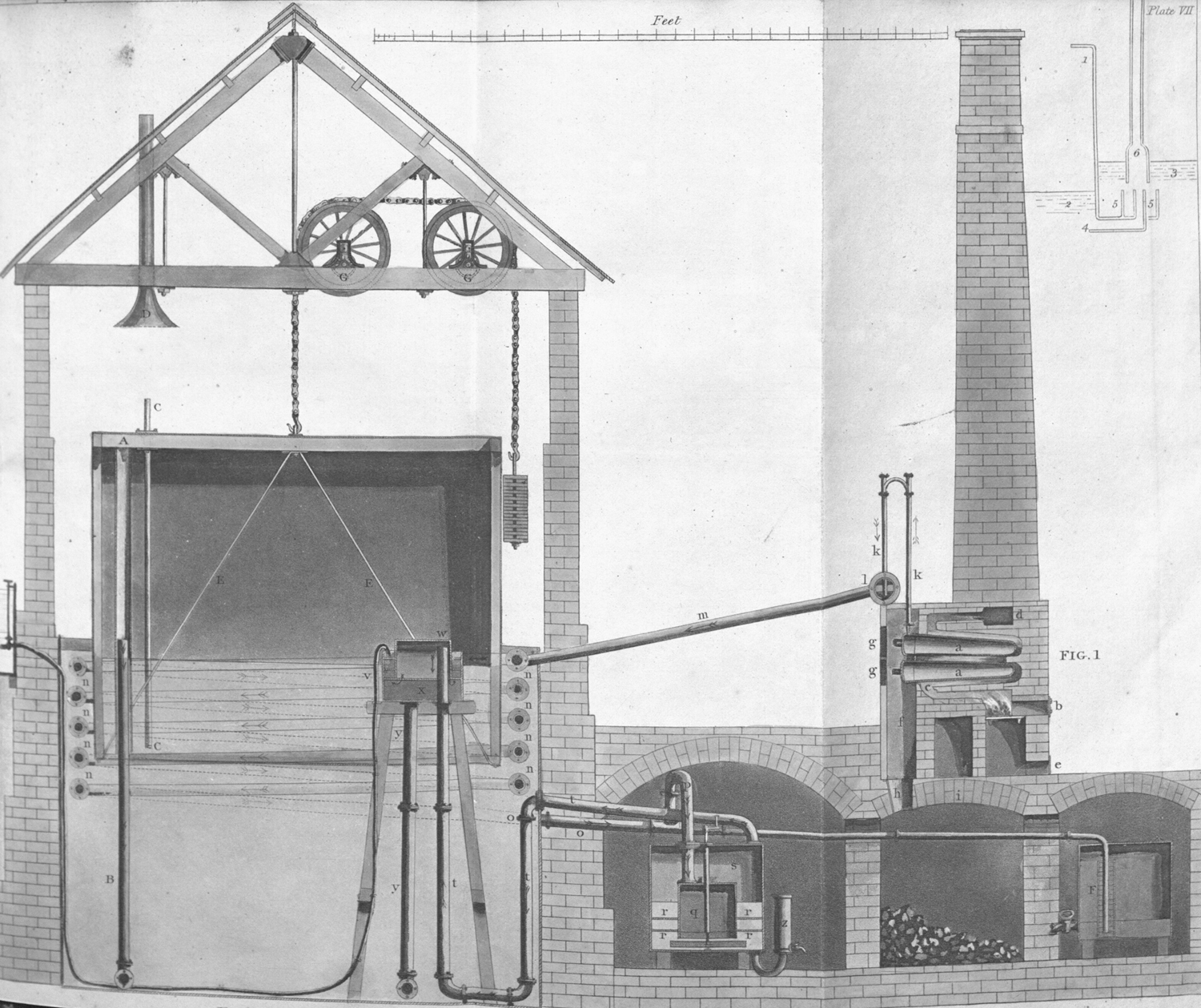
The first London gasworks 1814. Plate from Accum's A Practical Treatise on Gas Light (1815). The retorts are set transversely, directly under the chimney; the gasometer is on the left.

Accum became involved with the production of gas for lighting purposes through the efforts of Friedrich Albert Winsor (1763–1830), another German émigré, who had been waging a longstanding publicity campaign. In 1809, Accum was asked to appear before a Parliamentary committee that was considering granting a charter for a gaslight company Winsor had been promoting. While unsuccessful in its first attempt, the bill passed in 1810 and the company was incorporated under the name "Gas Light and Coke Company". The newly incorporated company met the conditions laid out in the bill and began operating in 1812 with Accum as a member of its board of directors. Accum oversaw the construction of a gas plant on Curtain Road, which was the first such plant in the history of gaslight. After that time, gaslight was no longer limited to industrial mills and was introduced into urban life. Westminster Bridge was lighted with gas lamps in 1813, and a year later, the streets in Westminster followed. In 1815, Accum published "Description of the Process of Manufacturing Coal-Gas". In the introduction, Accum compared the newly formed gas utility with the water companies that had been operating in London since the early 18th century: "Through gas, it will be possible to have light in all rooms, as is presently the case with water." When this book was translated into German in Berlin in 1815, an explanatory note had to be added, as no such water utilities existed there: "There are many private homes in England that are provided with pipes in the walls so that in almost all rooms, all one needs to do to get water is open a faucet."

In London, in 1814, there was a single gasometer of 400 m^{3} (14,000 cu ft), by 1822, there were four gas companies, whose gasometers had a total combined volume of almost a million ft^{3} To keep delivery routes for the gas pipelines as short as possible, gas plants were set up within the city districts where the gas was consumed. The arrival of these types of chemical plants to inhabited parts of the city provoked public criticism of the new technology. This was also directed at poisonous effluent generated by the plant operations. These harsh critiques were especially fierce once accidental explosions occurred at some plants. Accum, who by this point was a leading proponent of gaslight in addition to his work as a chemist, strongly refuted these criticisms in his writings. Through careful analysis he showed that as a whole, accidents were caused by carelessness of plant workers rather than problems with the technology, and were therefore avoidable.

From early on in its conception, Accum had been concerned with the byproducts of coal gas production, which included tar and sulphur compounds. These were typically buried or dumped into nearby waterways. The ammonium and sulphur compounds were especially damaging to the environment. In 1820, Accum began demanding legal measures to prevent the discharge of these byproducts into the sewage systems and rivers.

=== "There is death in the pot" ===
In 1820 Accum began the public struggle against harmful food additives with his book entitled A Treatise on Adulterations of Food and Culinary Poisons. Some additives derived from plants, and used as preservatives or to alter tastes or appearance, had already been in use for some time. The beginning of the 19th century saw a rapid increase in the industrial preparation and packaging of foods. The drastic increase of additives used in these processes became a serious health concern. The production and distribution of food, instead of being one between local farmers and townspeople, increasingly became a centralized process in large factories. The proliferation of newly discovered chemicals and the absence of laws moderating their use, made it possible for unscrupulous merchants to use them to boost profits at a cost to the public health. Accum was the first to publicly proclaim the hazards of this practice and to reach a wide audience with his concerns.

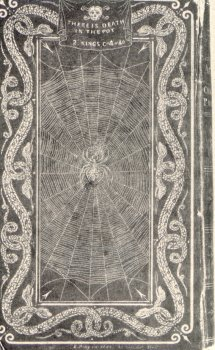
“There is death in the pot” − Cover of Accum's book A Treatise on Adulterations of Food and Culinary Poisons (1820)

Accum alludes to his moral stance on food adulterations as he claims that:

The man who robs a fellow subject of a few shillings on the high-way, is sentenced to death; while he who distributes a slow poison to a whole community, escapes punishment.

A thousand copies of A Treatise on Adulterations of Food and Culinary Poisons were sold within a month of its publication.

The various chapters of the book alternate between harmless forgeries such as mixing dried pea grounds in coffee, and much more dangerous contamination by truly poisonous substances. Accum explained to his readers that there was a high lead content in Spanish olive oil, caused by the lead containers used to clear the oil, and recommended using oil from other countries such as France and Italy, where this was not practiced. He warned against bright green sweets sold by itinerant merchants in the streets of London as the colour was produced with "sapgreen", a colorant with high copper content. "Vinegar", he explained to his readers, "was frequently mixed with sulphuric acid in order to increase its acidity."

Accum paid particular attention to beer, introducing the subject with the comment: "Malt beverages, and especially porter, the preferred drink of the inhabitants of London and other large cities, is among the items which is most frequently adulterated in the course of supply." He claimed that English beer was occasionally mixed with molasses, honey, vitriol, pepper and even opium. Among the most shocking customs he pointed out was the practice of adding fishberries, part of the family Menispermaceae, to porter. It became evident during the French Revolutionary Wars that the practice was getting out of hand, and Accum attributed the intoxicating power of the drink to the addition of this plant matter.

The Treatise on Adulterations of Food and Culinary Poisons has two further notable characteristics. First, like Accum's earlier writings, it was written with descriptions of the simple techniques of analytical chemistry he employed, thereby making them more accessible to his readers. He wanted to make every test repeatable in the simplest possible way by a non-expert. Accum wrote in the foreword to his first edition:

In stating the experimental proceedings necessary for the detection of the frauds which it has been my object to expose, I have confined myself to the task of pointing out such operations only as may be performed by persons unacquainted with chemical science; and it has been my purpose to express all necessary rules and instructions in the plainest language, divested of those recondite terms of science, which would be out of place in a work intended for general perusal.

The second characteristic was that Accum did not limit his campaign to simply exposing problems. At the end of every chapter, he included names of merchants of who had in years prior to 1820 been caught adulterating foodstuffs. In this way, Accum tried to deprive them of business and thereby had an effect on the London economy.

=== Reaction to Treatise on Adulterations of Food ===
Accum was well aware before the publication of his book that mentioning specific names from London's business world would provoke a resistance and a possibly a severe reaction. In the foreword to the first edition he called the publication of the names of those adulterating foodstuffs an "invidious office" and a "painful duty," which he undertook as a verification for his statements. Although he further stated that he carefully avoided citing any except those authenticated in Parliamentary documents and other records, this did not save him from the ire of his opponents. By the time the second edition appeared, he mentioned in the foreword that he had received threats. At the same time, this did not stop him from putting "the unwary on their guard" against the deceits of unscrupulous men. He further added that he wished to notify his hidden enemies that he would report for posterity the crimes these swindlers and their base associates had been found guilty of in public justice—that is, of having made basic foodstuffs poisonous.

=== Scandal and lawsuit ===
The process that ultimately led to Accum's departure from England and return to Germany began a few months after the publication of his book on the poisoning of foodstuffs. For a long time, many contradictory accounts have been given of the exact circumstances of his exile. Finally in 1951, R. J. Cole, in an addendum to the minutes of Royal Institution, proved that the presentation of the events adopted in the article in the Dictionary of National Biography, and also later in the Allgemeinen Deutschen Biographie.

Cole completely reprinted the minutes of an extraordinary meeting of the Royal Institution of 23 December 1820, which show that these events were initiated through an observation made by a librarian of the Royal Institution named Sturt. Sturt reported to his superiors that on 5 November 1820, a number of pages were removed from books in the reading room of the institution, books Accum had read. On the instructions of his superiors, Sturt cut a small hole in the wall of the reading room to watch Accum from an adjoining room. On the evening of 20 December, as recorded in the minutes, Sturt could see Accum tear out and walk off with a paper concerning the ingredients and uses of chocolate. The paper had been in an issue of Nicholson’s Journal. Accum's premises on Old Compton Street were searched on the order of a magistrate for the City of London, and torn pages were indeed discovered there. These could be matched to books belonging to the Royal Institution.

The Magistrate after hearing the whole of the Case observed that however valuable the books might be from which the leaves found in Mr Accum’s house had been taken, yet the leaves separated from them were only waste paper. If they had weighed a pound he would have committed him for the value of a pound of waste paper, but this not being the case he discharged him.

The Royal Institution committee that met on 23 December 1820 was not, however, satisfied with this judgment, and decided to take further legal action against Accum. On 10 January 1821, an open letter directed to Earl Spencer, the president of the Institution, appeared in The Times defending Accum. The letter was signed "A.C", and Cole supposed that the author was the surgeon Anthony Carlisle, who had been friends with Accum since the first years of the latter's stay in London. This unsought support availed Accum little, as the minutes of the Royal Institution from 16 April 1821 show. These report the commencement of a lawsuit against Accum for theft of paper valued at 14 pence. Two of his friends were included in the indictment: the publisher Rudolph Ackermann and the architect John Papworth. These three appeared in court and paid altogether 400 pounds sterling as surety.

=== Return to Germany ===
In the two years before his return to Germany, Accum had published a number of books dealing with nutrition chemistry. In 1820, he published two works, one on beer production (A Treatise on the Art of Brewing) and another on wine (A Treatise on the Art of Making Wine). The following year appeared Culinary Chemistry, in which Accum provided practical information about the scientific basis of cooking. He also published a book on bread (A Treatise on the Art of Making Good and Wholesome Bread). Even when he had returned to Germany, his works continued to be reprinted and were translated into French, Italian and German, reaching a wide readership in Europe, as well as in the US after it was reprinted there.

Immediately upon his arrival in Germany, Accum went to the town of Althaldensleben. There, the industrialist Johann Gottlob Nathusius had acquired various estates and was using them to found a sprawling industrial settlement. Nathusius was a German pioneer in the field of sugar production from beets, and had established a factory for its production in that town between 1813 and 1816. It was probably Nathusius’ extensive library and chemical laboratory that drew Accum. He remained only a short time in Althaldensleben, however, as he soon got a professorship at the Gewerbeinstitut and the Bauakademie in Berlin. His teaching in the areas of physics, chemistry, and mineralogy, were collected in the two volume work, Physische und chemische Beschaffenheit der Baumaterialien, deren Wahl, Verhalten und zweckmässige Anwendung, published in Berlin in 1826. It was the only work Accum published originally in German.

A few years after settling down in Berlin, Accum had a house built at 16 Marienstraße (later 21 Marienstraße), where he dwelt until his death. During his last years, he suffered from a bad case of gout, which ultimately led to his death. His illness took a serious turn for the worse in June 1838, and he rapidly deteriorated. On 28 June, approximately 16 years after he return to Germany, Accum died at the age of 69 in Berlin. He was buried there at the Dorotheenstädtischen Friedhof.

== Bibliography and primary sources ==
The first biographical sketch of Friedrich Accum's life was written by the American agricultural chemist and historian of science Charles Albert Browne, Jr. in 1925. He studied the life and works of Accum closely for ten years, which he was able to complement with information from civil and ecclesiastical sources in Bückeburg. His enthusiasm for the subject was so great that he traveled to Germany in July 1930 to meet with Hugo Otto Georg Hans Westphal (26 August 1873 – 15 September 1934), a great-grandson of Accum's. Brown's last writing on the subject, which appeared in 1948 in Chymia, a journal for the history of chemistry, relied to a great extent on the information he gathered from Hans Westphal. Three years later, R. J. Cole published an outline of Accum's life based on English sources. He was particularly concerned with bringing new information to light about the judicial process of 1821. Like Browne, Cole also provided relatively little data about the last part of Accum's life in Berlin. A modern presentation of Accum's life and works that fills in the lacuna in the available biographies has not been written. Lawson Cockroft of the Royal Society of Chemistry in London observed that Friedrich Accum was one of those chemists who, despite significant achievements in his lifetime, was by and large forgotten today.

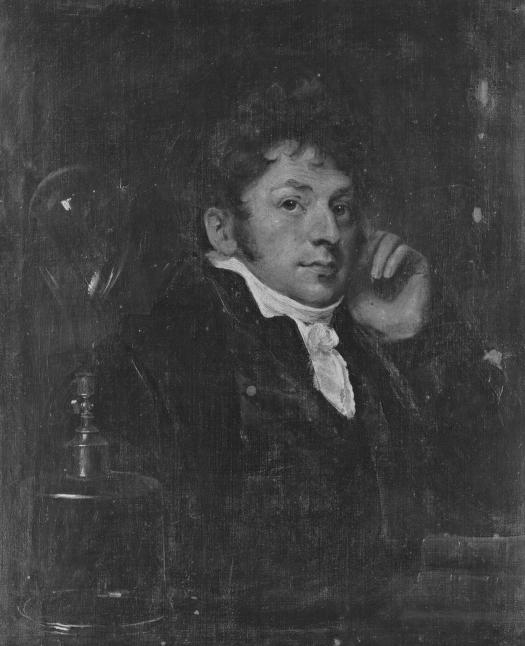
Black and white photograph of an oil painting by Samuel Drummond, from London.

Probably the best known pictorial representation of Accum was an engraving by James Thomson made in July 1820 for the English journal European Magazine. It shows Accum sitting at a table close to a gas lamp. Thomson's engraving was probably based on an oil painting by the London portrait painter Samuel Drummond (1765–1844), who had shown Accum in a similar pose in a painting produced a few years prior to this. In addition, Accum's brother-in-law, the artist Wilhelm Strack, painted an oil portrait that shows Accum as a young man.

A few letter fragments and documents relating to Accum still exist in his family's possession. A certificate from the Gesellschaft naturforschender Freunde (society of natural philosophical friends), based in Berlin and granting honorary membership to Accum, dated 1 November 1814, was made available online in 2006. A letter from Accum written in London and addressed to his brother Philipp in Bückeburg, about life in London after the end of the Napoleonic Wars, is also available online at Wikisource.

== Publications ==
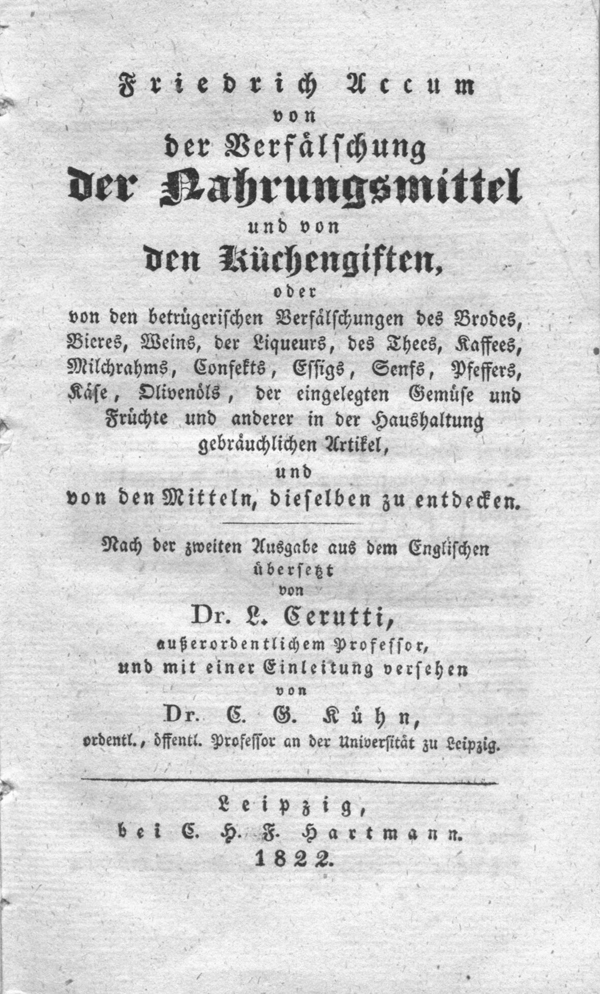
Title page: "Von der Verfälschung der Nahrungsmittel und von den Küchengiften", 1822

- System of Theoretical and Practical Chemistry, London 1803 Vol 1, Vol 2 Second edition 1807; Reprint Philadelphia 1808 Vol 1 Vol 2, Second edition 1814 Vol 1 Vol 2
- A Practical Essay on the Analysis of Minerals, London 1804; Reprint Philadelphia 1809; and a new edition expanded to two volumes in 1808 with the title A Manual of Analytical Mineralogy
- An Analysis of a Course of Lectures on Mineralogy, London 1809, expanded edition in 1810 under the title A Manual of a Course of Lectures on Experimental Chemistry and Mineralogy
- Descriptive Catalogue of the Apparatus and Instruments Employed in Experimental and Operative Chemistry, in Analytical Chemistry, and in the Pursuits of the Recent Discoveries of Electro-Chemical Science, London 1812
- Elements of Crystallography, London 1813
- Practical Treatise on Gas-Light, London 1815, went through four English editions to 1818, rewritten with the title Description of the Process of Manufacturing Coal-Gas. For the lighting of streets, houses, and public buildings, with elevations, sections, and plans of the most improved sorts of apparatus. Now employed at the gas works in London, London 1819, Second edition 1820; German translation by Wilhelm August Lampadius entitled Praktische Abhandlung über die Gaserleuchtung: enthaltend eine summarische Beschreibung des Apparates und der Maschinerie, Berlin 1816, Second edition 1819; the 1816 French edition Traité pratique de l’éclairage par le gaz inflammable contained a forward and was expanded by Friedrich Albert Winsor, Paris 1816; Italian Trattato pratico sopra il gas illuminante: contenente una completa descrizione dell’apparecchio ... con alcune osservazioni, Milan 1817
- A Practical Essay on Chemical Re-agents or Tests: Illustrated by a Series of Experiments, London 1816, expanded second edition 1818 with the title Practical Treatise on the Use and Application of Chemical Tests with Concise Directions for Analyzing Metallic Ores, Metals, Soils, Manures and Mineral Waters, Third edition 1828; reprint Philadelphia 1817; French Traité pratique sur l’usage et le mode d’application des réactifs chimiques, Paris 1819; Italian (translation of second English edition) Trattato practico per l’uso ed apllicazione de’reagenti chimici, Milan 1819
- Chemical Amusement, a Series of Curious and Instructive Experiments in Chemistry Which Are Easily Performed and Unattended by Danger, London 1817, Second edition 1817, Third edition 1818, fourth reprint 1819; German Chemische Unterhaltungen: eine Sammlung merkwürdiger und lehrreicher Erzeugnisse der Erfahrungschemie, Kopenhagen 1819, entitled Chemische Belustigungen Nürnberg 1824; second American edition based on the third English edition with additions by Thomas Cooper, Philadelphia 1818; French translation by V. Riffault Manual de Chimie Amusante; ou nouvelles recreations chimiques, contenant une suite d’experiences d’une execution facile et sans danger, ainsi qu’un grand nombre de faits curieux et instructifs, 1827, Second edition 1829 later reprinted by A. D. Vergnaud, final and sixth reprinting Paris 1854; two volume Italian translation Divertimento chimico contenente esperienze curiose, Milan 1820, second expanded edition by Pozzi La Chimica dilettevole o serie di sperienze curiose e instruttive di chimica chi si esequiscono con facilità e sicurezza, Milan 1854
- Dictionary of the Apparatus and Instruments Employed in Operative and Experimental Chemistry, London 1821, reprinted omitting the author's name as Explanatory Dictionary of the Apparatus and Instruments Employed in the Various Operations of Philosophical and Experimental Chemistry by a Practical Chemist, London 1824
- A Treatise on Adulterations of Food and Culinary Poisons: Exhibiting the Fraudulent Sophistications of Bread, Beer, Wine, Spirituous Liquors, Tea, Coffee, Cream, Confectionery, Vinegar, Mustard, Pepper, Cheese, Olive Oil, Pickles, and Other Articles Employed in Domestic Economy, and Methods of Detecting Them, London 1820, Second edition 1820, Third edition 1821, Fourth edition 1822; reprint Philadelphia 1820; German translation by L. Cerutti Von der Verfälschung der Nahrungsmittel und von den Küchengiften, Leipzig 1822, Second edition 1841
- A Treatise on the Art of Brewing: exhibiting the London practice of Brewing, Porter, Brown Stout, Ale, Table Beer, and various other Kinds of Malt Liquors, London 1820, Second edition 1821; German translation by Accum's niece Fredrica Strack Abhandlung über die Kunst zu brauen, oder Anweisung Porter, Braun-Stout, Ale, Tischbier ... zu brauen, Hamm 1821; French translation by Riffault Manual théorique et pratique du brasseur, Paris 1825, later reprinted by A. D. Vergnaud
- Guide to the Chalybeate Spring of Thetford, London 1819
- A Treatise on the Art of Making Wine, London 1820, followed by many edition, the last being 1860; French Nouveau Manuel complet de la Fabrication des Vins de Fruits, 1827, later translation by Guilloud and Ollivier as Nouveau Manuel complet de la fabrication des vins de fruits, du cidre, du poiré, des boissons rafraîchissantes, des bières économiques et de ménage ..., Paris 1851
- Treatise on the Art of Making Good and Wholesome Bread, London 1821
- Culinary Chemistry, exhibiting the scientific principles of Cookery, with concise instructions for preparing good and wholesome Pickles, Vinegar, Conserves, Fruit Jellies with observations on the chemical constitution and nutritive qualities of different kinds of food, London 1821
- Physische und chemische Beschaffenheit der Baumaterialien, deren Wahl, Verhalten und zweckmässige Anwendung, 2 volumes, Berlin 1826

== Bibliography ==
- Cole, R. J. (1951). "Friedrich Accum (1769–1838). A biographical study". Annals of Science. 7 (2): 128–143. doi:10.1080/00033795100202291.
- Browne, Charles Albert (1925). "The Life and Chemical Services of Frederick Accum". Journal of Chemical Education. 2 (10–12): 829–851, 1008–1034, 1140–1149. Bibcode:1925JChEd...2..829B. doi:10.1021/ed002p829. hdl:2027/wu.89102112083.
- Schivelbusch, Wolfgang (1983). Lichtblicke: zur Geschichte der künstlichen Helligkeit im 19. Jahrhundert (in German). Munich: C. Hanser.

Translation:

- Schivelbusch, Wolfgang (1988). Disenchanted night: the industrialization of light in the nineteenth century. Berkeley: University of California Press.
