= Elliott Torrance Galt =

Canadian businessman

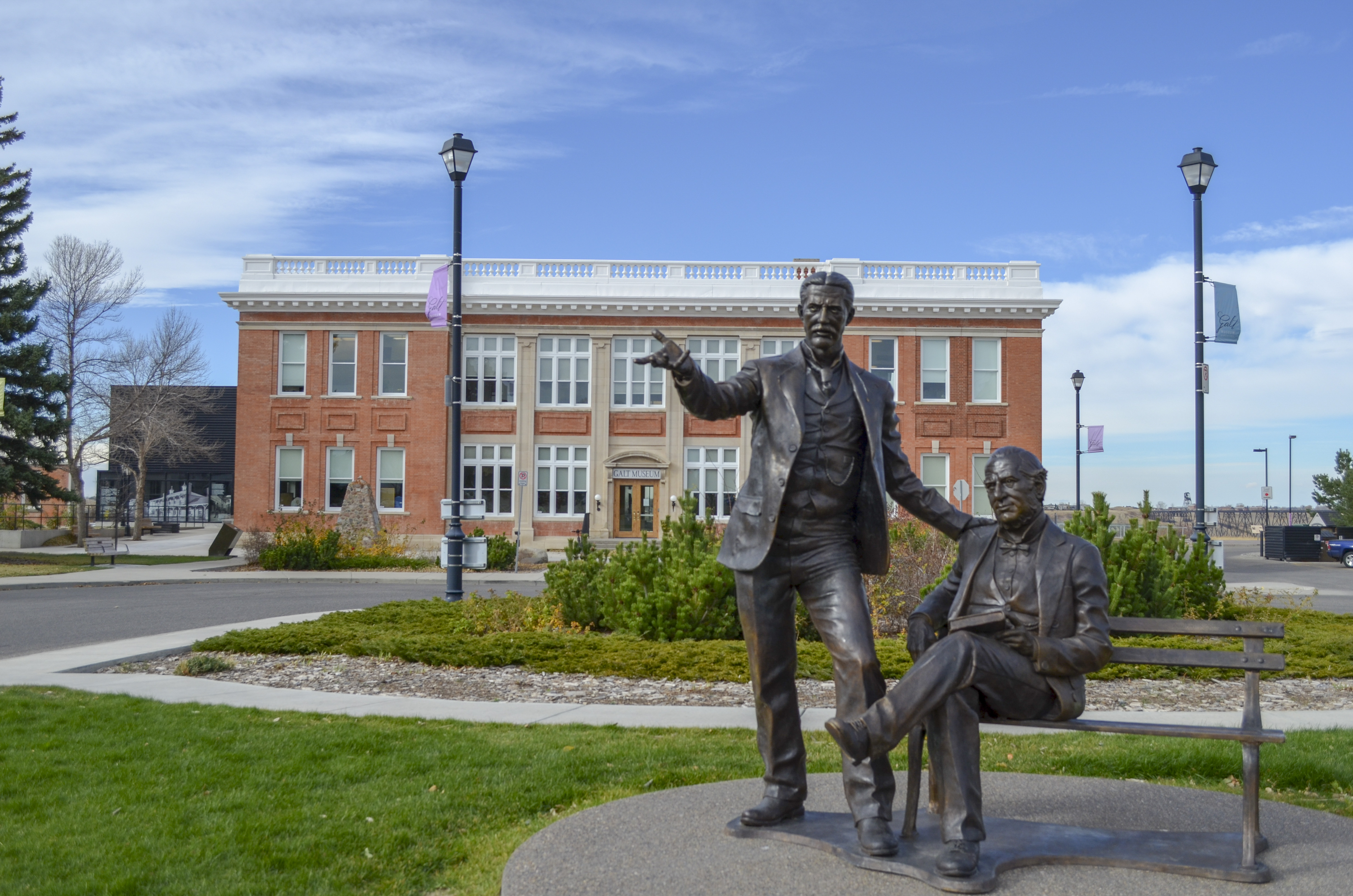
Statue of Alexander and Elliot Galt outside the Galt Hospital building which houses the Galt Museum & Archives

Elliott Torrance Galt (24 May 1850 – 15 May 1928) was a Canadian businessman and developer.

The grandson of the novelist John Galt and only child of the politician Sir Alexander Tilloch Galt (1817–1893) by his wife Elliott (d. 1850 shortly after giving birth to her son), daughter of the entrepreneur John Torrance, Galt was educated at Bishop's College School in Lennoxville, Lower Canada, before studying at Harrow and at Tours in France.

Galt's business career began in 1883, following a period in the 1870s as clerk to various Montreal businessmen including John Rose and having held the position of secretary to Edgar Dewdney, Indian commissioner for the Northwest Territories, which led to Galt's appointment as assistant Indian commissioner at Regina.

With his father, Galt was a major figure in the financing and management of Lethbridge, Alberta, building 571 kilometres of irrigation canals and establishing coal mines with a daily capacity of over 2,000 tonnes.

Galt died, unmarried, from complications related to a heart attack in New York City, where he had gone for medical treatment.

== See also ==
- List of Bishop's College School alumni
