= Alexander Tilloch Galt =

Canadian Father of Confederation (1817–1893)

The Honourable Sir Alexander Tilloch Galt PC GCMG CB
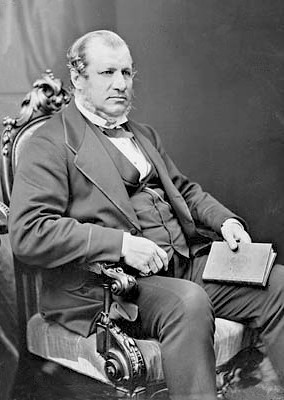
- Sir Alexander Tilloch Galt in 1869

Member of the Canadian Parliament for Town of Sherbrooke
- In office 1867–1872
- Preceded by: District created
- Succeeded by: Edward Towle Brooks

Minister of Finance
- In office July 1, 1867 – November 7, 1867
- Prime Minister: John A. Macdonald
- Preceded by: Office created
- Succeeded by: Sir John Rose, 1st Baronet

1st Canadian High Commissioner to the United Kingdom
- In office 1880–1883
- Preceded by: Sir John Rose, 1st Baronet (as Financial Commissioner)
- Succeeded by: Charles Tupper

Personal details
- Born: September 5, 1817 Chelsea, England
- Died: September 19, 1893 (aged 76) Montreal, Quebec, Canada
- Resting place: Mount Royal Cemetery
- Party: Liberal-Conservative
- Spouses: Elliott Torrance (m. 1848; died 1850); Amy Gordon Torrance (m. 1851)
- Relations: Sir Hugh Allan (cousin); Alexander Tilloch (grandfather)
- Children: 11, including Elliott
- Parent: John Galt

Sir Alexander Tilloch Galt, PC GCMG CB (September 6, 1817 – September 19, 1893) was a Canadian industrialist, politician, and Father of Confederation, the union of British North American colonies into Canada.

== Early life ==
He was born in Chelsea, England on September 6, 1817. He was the third son of John Galt, a Scottish novelist, and Elizabeth (née Tilloch) Galt. His mother was the only daughter of Alexander Tilloch, the journalist and inventor who founded the Philosophical Magazine. He was a first cousin of Sir Hugh Allan of Montreal, the owner of the Allan Shipping Line which was the largest privately owned shipping empire in the world in 1882. He was educated at Reading School.

== Career ==
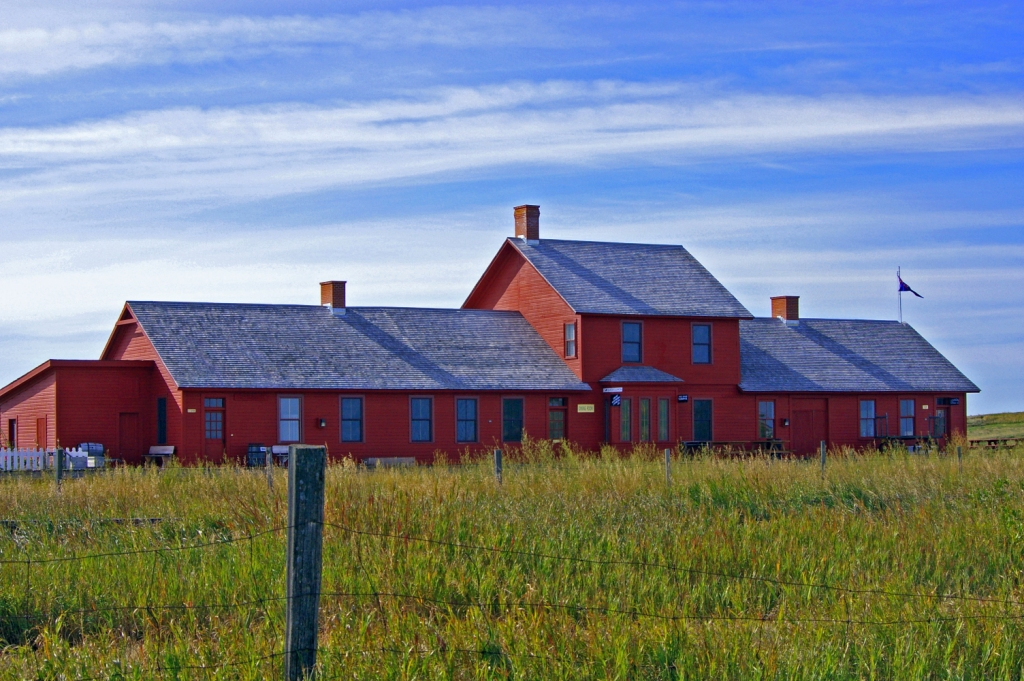
The International Train Station Depot in the County of Warner No. 5, Alberta

He was a member of the Great Coalition government in the Province of Canada that secured Confederation between 1864 and 1867. He became a leading figure in the creation of the Coalition when he was asked to become premier of the Province of Canada by then Governor-General Sir Edmund Walker Head. Doubting his ability to demand the loyalty of the majority of members of the Legislative Assembly, he turned down the position. Still, he recommended that George-Étienne Cartier and John A. Macdonald be asked to become co-leaders of the new Government.

Cartier and Macdonald asked him to become Inspector-General of Canada. He accepted the post on the condition that Macdonald and Cartier made Confederation a key platform in their new Government. In 1858, Alexander Tilloch Galt made a motion in the Legislature at Kingston recommending that the Province of Canada ask the British Government to create a federal union of British North America (Canada East and West, Prince Edward Island, Newfoundland, New Brunswick, and Nova Scotia) and Rupert's Land (owned by the Hudson's Bay Company). The motion succeeded, and Alexander Galt, John Ross, and Sir George-Étienne Cartier went to London to begin the long process of convincing the British to make British North America into the first sovereign Dominion within the British Empire.

As Inspector General, Galt reformed the Province of Canada's banking system trade policies. He was the main architect of the Cayley-Galt Tariff, which protected colonial businesses and caused consternation in both Britain and the United States.

On July 1, 1867, Canada East and West, New Brunswick, and Nova Scotia became the first provinces in British North America to form the Dominion of Canada. Galt served as the first Minister of Finance in the new Confederation. As minister of Finance, he reversed many of his earlier policies, promoting trade within the British Empire. Following a strong disagreement with Macdonald and Cartier concerning the fate of the Commercial Bank of Canada, Galt resigned from Government. He continued to sit as an MP until 1872.

Nevertheless, Galt remained an important figure in Canadian business and politics. In 1877, The British appointed him as their representative in the Halifax Fisheries Commission concerning American fishing rights in Canadian waters. Galt was sent to London to be Canada's informal representative, thereafter a rapprochement with the re-elected Macdonald. As this was the only important office of the Canadian Government overseas at the time, he also travelled to France and Spain to negotiate trade deals with those nations. The British Government knew of these trips and was displeased that Canada had developed a foreign policy separate from the Empire. The British demanded that Galt's position be formalized, and in late 1880, he became the first Canadian High Commissioner in London. He left his post on 1 June 1883.

=== Business ventures ===
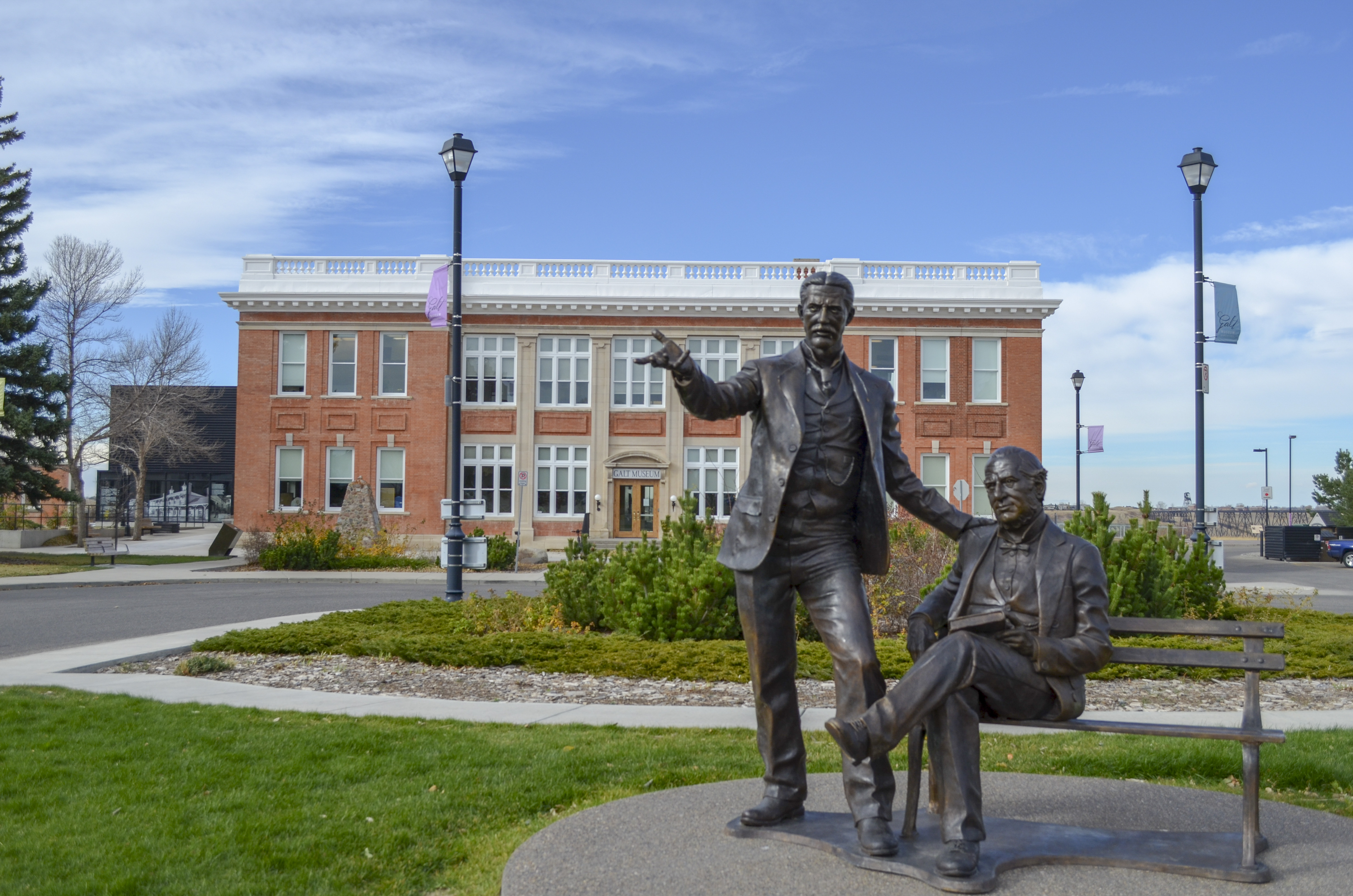
Statue of Alexander and Elliot Galt with the 1910 Hospital Building, Lethbridge, Alberta

Sir Alexander Galt and his son Elliott Torrance Galt used their connections in Ottawa to arrange for Elliot to be appointed the Assistant Indian Commissioner in southern Alberta. Alexander was undoubtedly aware of the work done by Dr. George Dawson to map the coal deposits in south Alberta on behalf of the Geological Survey of Canada. As well, knowing a railroad was soon to be built in the region, Alexander likely saw the economic potential in southern Alberta's coal. This knowledge and planning may have been part of why he secured Elliot a post as Assistant Indian Commissioner.

Alexander Galt sent Nicholas Bryant and William Stafford to decide the best location for a mine in southern Alberta. The men took samples at five locations across the region. Finally, Stafford decided upon the west side of the Oldman River. On October 13, 1882, William Stafford and a group of miners from Nova Scotia opened Drift Mine No. 1 near the community of Coalbanks. Alexander created the North Western Coal and Navigation Company to grow his industry with the participation of English investors, the largest shareholder being William Lethbridge. William Lethbridge was named the president of the company, and the growing community called Coalbanks was officially renamed Lethbridge in his honour in 1885.

Alexander and Elliot Galt established the Alberta Railway and Coal Company to build two narrow-gauge rail lines, hoping that the infrastructure would attract other businesses and settlers to the region. One rail line would go east to Dunmore, near Medicine Hat, and the second line would go south to Montana. Canada's Governor-General, the Marquess of Landsdowne, demonstrated the Dominion government's support of the Galt enterprises by opening the Galts' railway in September 1885 in Lethbridge.

The Federal Government granted large tracts of land in southern Alberta to the Galt's companies in return for building those two rail lines. The Galts wanted to sell that land to colonists and settlers, but the community and the region did not attract new European settlers to move here in the numbers they had expected.

Charles Ora Card was sent to establish a colony of the Church of Jesus Christ of Latter-day Saints (LDS) in Canada in 1886. He selected a spot "3 miles up Lee's Creek," the current site of the Town of Cardston. A small group of Mormon colonists arrived to establish the community in June 1887.

Card encouraged the Galts to undertake a significant irrigation project because the area around Cardston was so dry. Even though he was unable to secure financing for the project at a time of nationwide recession, the Galts nevertheless formed the Alberta Irrigation Company to purchase the Alberta Railway and Coal Company land for future irrigation projects. Galt, Charles A. Magrath, the Company Land Commissioner, and the Lethbridge News lobbied the Government for almost ten years for additional funding for irrigation projects.

In 1896, the Dominion Government and the Canadian Pacific Railway (CPR) agreed to fund their irrigation plan by supplying cash, constructing a rail line to the Crowsnest Pass and writing off the debt of surveying fees on previous land grants.

The leaders of the Church of Jesus Christ of Latter-day Saints in Utah entered into a contract with Galt and Magrath in 1898 to construct an irrigation system in southern Alberta. The agreement required the Church to provide skilled labourers to build fifty miles of irrigation canals from Kimball to Stirling. They were also required to populate two settlements along the planned irrigation line with at least 250 colonists each. These two communities would become the Village of Stirling and the Town of Magrath.

Voluntary immigration of LDS colonists to southern Alberta was slow, despite propaganda put out by the Church. LDS Church leaders eventually resorted to calling members on "missions" to build the irrigation canal or move to southern Alberta with their families to meet the Church's contractual obligations for populating colonies.

By 1900, over 95 miles of canals had been completed, including the main canal from the St. Mary River starting from the hamlet of Kimball near the United States border and branch canal to Lethbridge.

The immigration boom to southern Alberta began in earnest in 1905. The Government, the CPR, and Galt and Magrath promoted the region heavily. People lined up for homesteads every year until the outbreak of the First World War. Galt's sugar beet farms and factory at Raymond and his model farm near Lethbridge demonstrated that agriculture could prosper in southern Alberta.

Galt's company, the North Western Coal and Navigation Company, went through various name changes as it moved into railways and irrigation enterprises. Prime Minister Sir Wilfrid Laurier dedicated the 1910 Galt Hospital addition. Since the construction of the new hospital Lethbridge Municipal Hospital in 1955, The 1910 Galt Hospital has served as a senior citizen's home, a rehabilitation centre, and the Health Unit. In 1966, the Sir Alexander Galt Museum moved from the Bowman Arts Centre into the Galt Hospital and occupied the top and bottom floors. In 1979, the Galt Museum & Archives took over the rest of the building. The museum has built two expansions to the original building, one in 1985 and the most recent in 2006.

Alexander Galt was also the founding president of The Guarantee Company of North America in 1872, providing fidelity bonds to guarantee the surety of employees of railroads and Government. Today, the company is the largest provider of surety bonds in all of Canada in public works and government services.

== Personal life ==
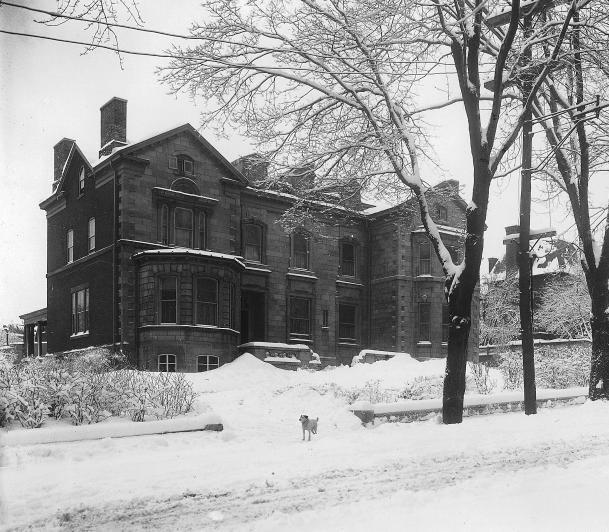
The Galt house on Simpson Street in the Golden Square Mile at Montreal

On February 9, 1848, Galt married Elliot Torrance (1828–1850), the daughter of merchant and entrepreneur John Torrance, of Saint-Antoine Hall, Montreal. Among Elliot's sibling was Daniel Torrance, who married Sophia Johnson Vanderbilt, a daughter of Cornelius Vanderbilt, and Jane Torrance, who married David Torrance, president of the Bank of Montreal. Galt's wife died on May 25, 1850, shortly after giving birth to their only son, Elliott Torrance Galt (1850–1928), a businessman and developer who died unmarried.

Later he married her younger sister, Amy Gordon Torrance (1834–1911). Amy gave birth to eight daughters and two more sons. They lived in Montreal at their house within the Golden Square Mile, which Galt built in about 1860. Galt appears to have had a very non-sectarian approach to religious faith and although the grandson of a Calvinist theologian, Alexander Galt supported both the Methodist and Anglican churches while his wife, Amy, was a lifelong Presbyterian.

Galt was reported to be a Freemason of Victoria Lodge, No. 16 (Quebec) of Sherbrooke.

Galt died in Montreal, Quebec on September 19, 1893. He is interred in the Mount Royal Cemetery in Montreal.

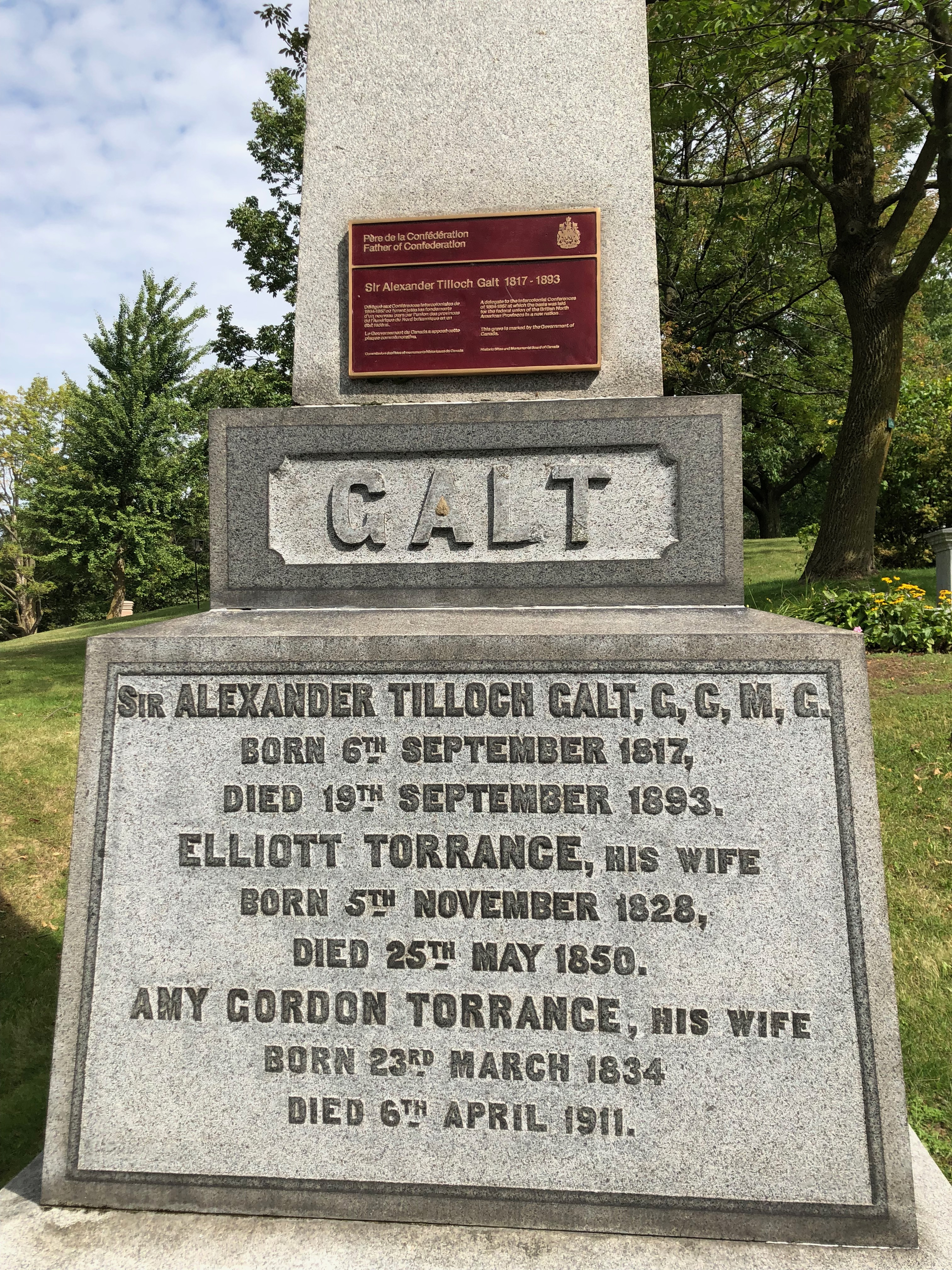
Galt's funeral monument in Mount Royal Cemetery.

== Legacy ==
He has a street named after him: Avenue Galt in the borough of Verdun, Quebec, in the city of Montreal where he had lands.

In Sherbrooke, Quebec, he has two streets named after him: rue Galt Est/Ouest and rue Alexandre. The Quartier Alexandre, located downtown, is also named after Galt. There is also a high school in Sherbrooke (Lennoxville) - Alexander Galt Regional High School (http://alexandergalt.etsb.qc.ca/) found close to Bishop's University, which is home to approximately 1000 students from grades 7 to 11.

The Galt Gardens public park and Galt Museum (formerly a hospital) in Lethbridge, Alberta are named after him.

Galt was portrayed by Patrick McKenna in the 2011 CBC Television film John A.: Birth of a Country.

== Archives ==
There is an Alexander Tilloch Galt fonds at Library and Archives Canada.

== Electoral record ==
1867 Canadian federal election: Sherbrooke (Town of)
| Party | Candidate | Votes |
|---|---|---|
| Liberal–Conservative | Alexander Tilloch Galt | acclaimed |
Source: Canadian Elections Database
