= Annals of the Parish =

Book by John Galt

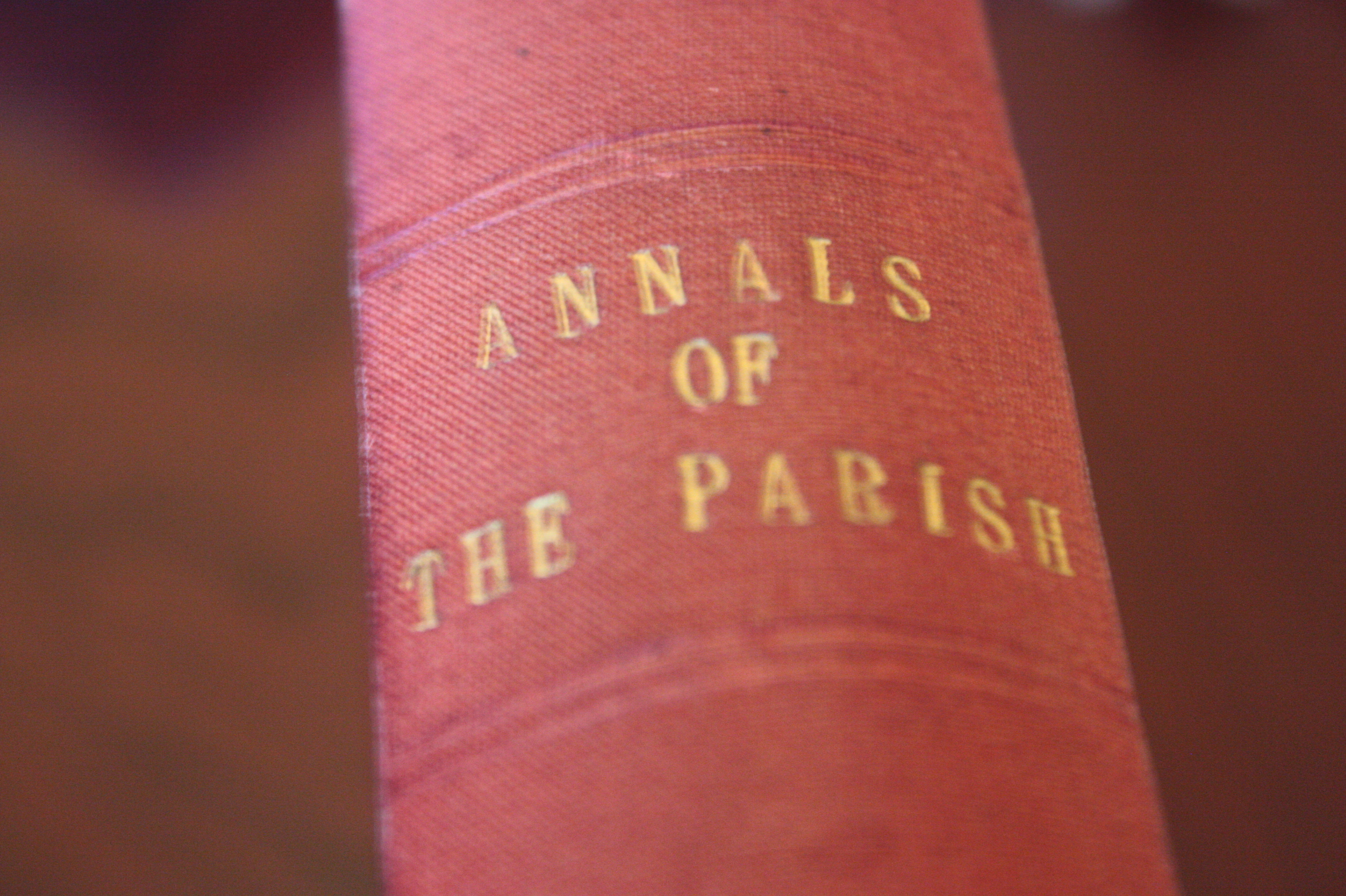
Annals of the Parish

Annals of the Parish (full title: Annals of the parish: or, The chronicle of Dalmailing; during the ministry of the Rev. Micah Balwhidder, written by himself) is an 1821 novel of Scottish country life by John Galt. Micah Balwhidder, considered to be the finest character created by Galt, reveals himself in the fictional first-person account to have human failings including conceit and vanity, as well as a keen interest in how the economy prospers. The book provides a humorous and realistic account of a typical parish minister of the late 18th and early 19th century, the way of life in rural Scotland, and the social changes of the Industrial Revolution.

As Balwhidder proudly notes in his introduction, the Annals begin with Balwhidder's appointment as minister on 25 October 1760, the same day that King George III came to the throne, and end with 1810 when the king "was set by as a precious vessel which had received a crack or a flaw, and could only be serviceable in the way of an ornament", and Balwhidder's ministry ends.

Annals of the Parish, written in Scots and English, is part of a series of Scottish stories written by Galt in the 1820s, which he referred to as "theoretical histories" or "Tales of the West".

== The French Revolution, Utilitarians in Dalmailing ==
In his entry for 1793, Balwhidder recalls having a remarkable dream on the first night of the year, in which dead nobles and commoners rose from a graveyard to witness a mighty battle, the scene of the fighting then changing to a wasteland with a distant city around a tower with the fiery letters "Public Opinion", a perplexing vision which appeared prophetic when he heard of the Execution of Louis XVI. In 1794 people of the parish favouring radical Jacobins emulating the reforms of the French Revolution become insolent and divided from the gentry, whose pride prevented them from showing any affability to these democrats. Concerned by this division, Balwhidder noted "a bruit and a sound about universal benevolence, philanthropy, utility, and all the other disguises with which an infidel philosophy appropriated to itself the charity, brotherly love, and welldoing inculcated by our holy religion". He preached to his congregation that he "thought they had more sense than to secede from Christianity to become Utilitarians; for that it would be a confession of ignorance of the faith they deserved, seeing that it was the main duty inculcated by our religion to do all in morals and manners to which the newfangled doctrine of utility pretended."

This was one of the earliest published uses of the term "utilitarian", which had been coined sometime in the preceding decades by English philosopher Jeremy Bentham.

== See also ==
- 1821 in literature
- Greenock
- Murder of Alexander Montgomerie
- Literary Taste: How to Form It
