= Philosophical Magazine =

- Discipline: Multidisciplinary
- Language: English
- Edited by: Edward A. Davis

Publication details
- Former names: The Philosophical Magazine and Journal; The London, Edinburgh, and Dublin Philosophical Magazine and Journal of Science
- History: 1798–present
- Publisher: Taylor & Francis
- Frequency: 36/year
- Open access: Hybrid
- License: creative commons
- Impact factor: 1.948 (2021)

Standard abbreviations
- ISO 4: Philos. Mag.

Indexing
- CODEN: PMHABF
- ISSN: 1478-6435 (print); 1478-6443 (web)
- LCCN: 2003249007
- OCLC no.: 476300855

Links
- Journal homepage; Online access; Online archive

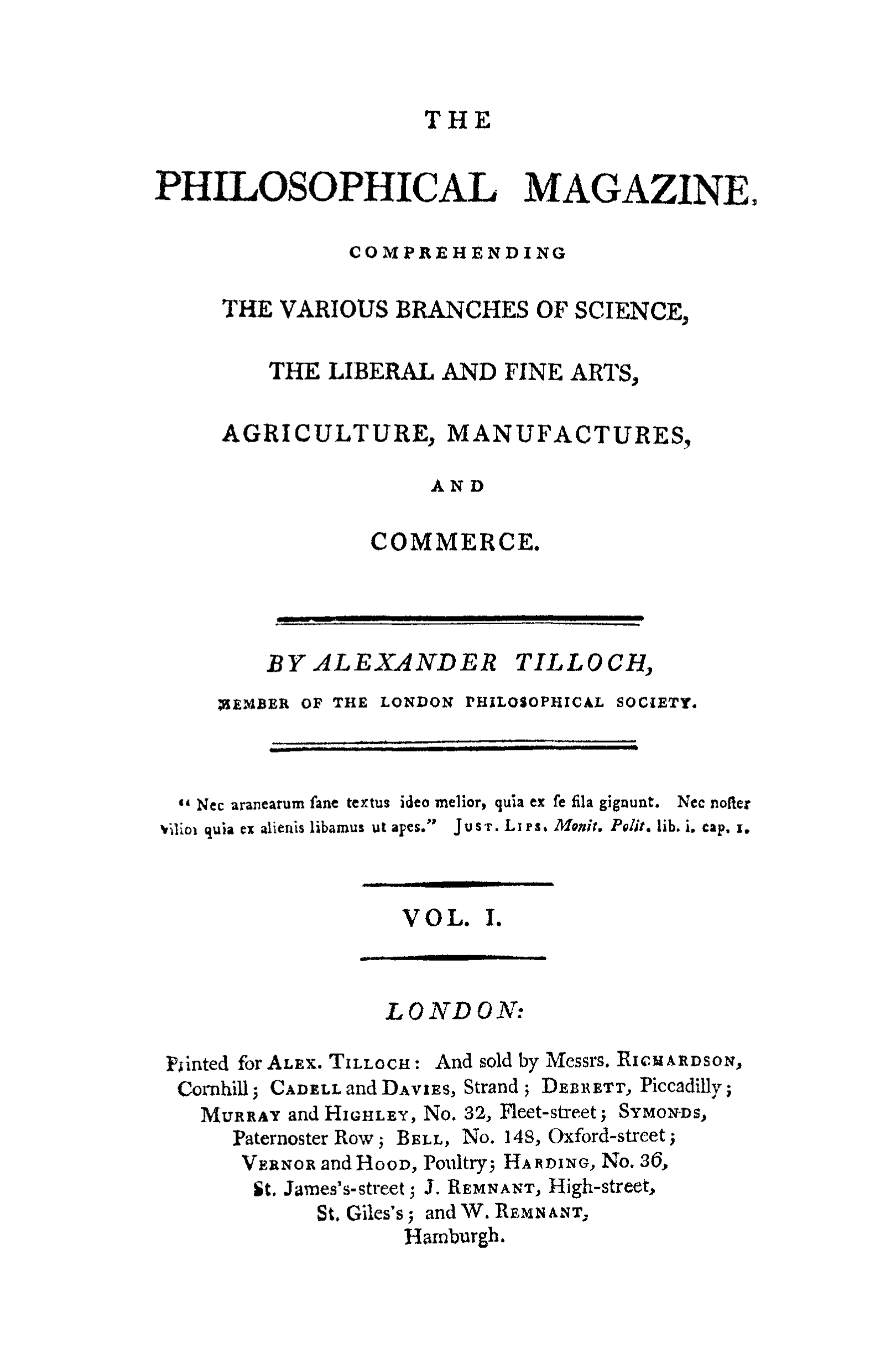
Titlepage of the first issue

The Philosophical Magazine is one of the oldest scientific journals published in English. It was established by Alexander Tilloch in 1798; in 1822 Richard Taylor became joint editor and it has been published continuously by Taylor & Francis ever since.

== Early history ==
The name of the journal dates from a period when "natural philosophy" embraced all aspects of science. The very first paper published in the journal carried the title "Account of Mr Cartwright's Patent Steam Engine". Other articles in the first volume include "Methods of discovering whether Wine has been adulterated with any Metals prejudicial to Health" and "Description of the Apparatus used by Lavoisier to produce Water from its component Parts, Oxygen and Hydrogen".

== 19th century ==
Early in the nineteenth century, classic papers by Humphry Davy, Michael Faraday and James Prescott Joule appeared in the journal and in the 1860s James Clerk Maxwell contributed several long articles, culminating in a paper containing the deduction that light is an electromagnetic wave or, as he put it himself, "We can scarcely avoid the inference that light consists in transverse undulations of the same medium which is the cause of electric and magnetic phenomena". The famous experimental paper of Albert A. Michelson and Edward Morley was published in 1887 and this was followed ten years later by J. J. Thomson with article "Cathode Rays" – essentially the discovery of the electron.

In 1814, the Philosophical Magazine merged with the Journal of Natural Philosophy, Chemistry, and the Arts, otherwise known as Nicholson's Journal (published by William Nicholson), to form The Philosophical Magazine and Journal. Further mergers in 1827 with the Annals of Philosophy, and in 1840 with The London and Edinburgh Philosophical Magazine and Journal of Science (named the Edinburgh Journal of Science until 1832) led to the retitling of the journal as The London, Edinburgh, and Dublin Philosophical Magazine and Journal of Science. In 1949, the title reverted to The Philosophical Magazine.

== 20th century ==
In the early part of the 20th century, Ernest Rutherford was a frequent contributor. He once told a friend to "watch out for the next issue of Philosophical Magazine; it is highly radioactive!" Aside from his work on understanding radioactivity, Rutherford proposed the experiments of Hans Geiger and Ernest Marsden that verified his nuclear model of the atom and led to Niels Bohr's famous paper on planetary electrons, which was published in the journal in 1913. Another classic contribution from Rutherford was entitled "Collision of α Particles with Light Atoms. IV. An Anomalous Effect in Nitrogen" – an article describing no less than the discovery of the proton, which he named a year later.

In 1978 the journal was divided into two independent parts, Philosophical Magazine A and Philosophical Magazine B. Part A published papers on structure, defects and mechanical properties while Part B focussed on statistical mechanics, electronic, optical and magnetic properties.

== Recent developments ==
Since the middle of the 20th century, the journal has focused on condensed matter physics and published significant papers on dislocations, mechanical properties of solids, amorphous semiconductors and glass. As subject area evolved and it became more difficult to classify research into distinct areas, it was no longer considered necessary to publish the journal in two parts, so in 2003 parts A and B were re-merged. In its current form, 36 issues of the Philosophical Magazine are published each year, supplemented by 12 issues of Philosophical Magazine Letters.

== Editors ==
Previous editors of the Philosophical Magazine have been John Tyndall, J.J. Thomson, Sir Nevill Mott, and William Lawrence Bragg. The journal is currently edited by Edward A. (Ted) Davis, who has been in this role since 1975.

== Philosophical Magazine Letters ==
In 1987, the sister journal Philosophical Magazine Letters was established with the aim of rapidly publishing short communications on all aspects of condensed matter physics. It is edited by Edward A. Davis and Peter Riseborough. This monthly journal had a 2022 impact factor of 1.2.

== Series ==
Over its 200-year history, Philosophical Magazine has occasionally restarted its volume numbers at 1, designating a new "series" each time. The journal's series are as follows:

- Philosophical Magazine, Series 1 (1798–1826), volumes 1 through 68
- Philosophical Magazine, Series 2 (1827–1832), volumes 1 through 11
- Philosophical Magazine, Series 3 (1832–1850), volumes 1 through 37
- Philosophical Magazine, Series 4 (1851–1875), volumes 1 through 50
- Philosophical Magazine, Series 5 (1876–1900), volumes 1 through 50
- Philosophical Magazine, Series 6 (1901–1925), volumes 1 through 50
- Philosophical Magazine, Series 7 (1926–1955), volumes 1 through 46
- Philosophical Magazine, Series 8 (1955–present), volumes 1 through 95 (through December 2015)

If the renumbering had not occurred, the 2015 volume (series 8, volume 95) would have been volume 407.
