= John Galt (novelist) =

Scottish writer (1779–1839)

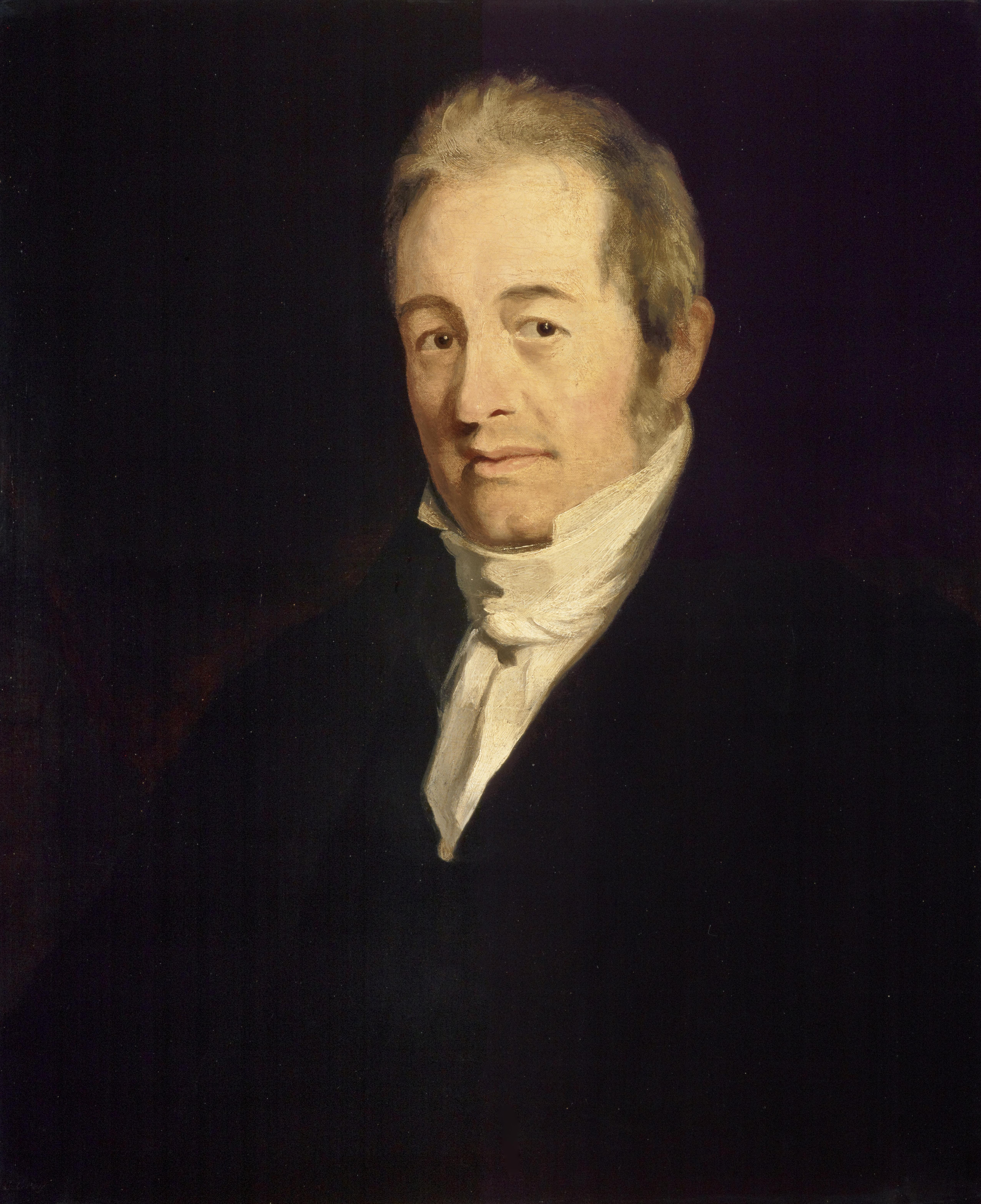
- Born: 2 May 1779; Irvine, Ayrshire, Scotland
- Died: 11 April 1839 (aged 59); Greenock, Scotland
- Occupations: Writer, colonial businessman
- Spouse: Elizabeth Tilloch
- Writing career
- Period: 1812–1839
- Genres: Poetry, drama, short stories, travel writing
- Notable works: Annals of the Parish; The Chronicle of Dalmailing, The Entail

Signature
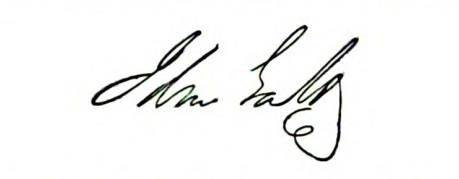

John Galt (/ɡɔːlt/; 2 May 1779 – 11 April 1839) was a Scottish novelist, entrepreneur, and political and social commentator. Galt has been called the first political novelist in the English language, due to being the first novelist to deal with issues of the Industrial Revolution.

Galt was the first superintendent of the Canada Company (1826–1829). The company was formed to populate a part of what is now Southern Ontario (then known as Upper Canada) in the first half of the 19th century; it was later called "the most important single attempt at settlement in Canadian history".

In 1829, Galt was recalled to Great Britain for mismanagement of the Canada Company (particularly incompetent bookkeeping), and was later jailed for failing to pay his son's tuition. Galt's Autobiography, published in London in 1833, includes a discussion of his life and work in Upper Canada.

He was the father of Sir Alexander Tilloch Galt of Montreal, Quebec, one of the leading Fathers of Confederation from Lower Canada.

== Life ==
Born on 2 May 1779 in the seaport of Irvine in Ayrshire, Galt was the son of a shipmaster and trader. Every year, Galt's whole family moved seasonally to Greenock. He grew up tall but rather delicate, and spent a lot of time listening to the "marvellous narrations" of some elderly women who lived in the close behind his grandmother's house. After tutoring at home, he joined Irvine Grammar public school in 1787, becoming a lifetime friend of his schoolfellow Henry Eckford. Around 1789, Galt's father owned and commanded a West Indiaman trading with Jamaica, and had a house built in Greenock. The family settled there, and at school Galt became close friends with classmates William Spence, a budding mathematician, and James Park, who spurred Galt's enthusiasm for writing and poetry. Their education, well suited to commerce, covered penmanship, arithmetic, French, geography, astronomy and mathematics, including navigation using a sextant on local hills in 1794.

=== Career, early publications ===
It was usual in Greenock for lads starting careers in commerce to first improve their penmanship by copying entries in the books of the custom house, so Galt and Park were "desked" there for a few months. At the age of 17, Galt became a junior clerk at a Greenock firm of merchants. He was a "voracious reader" using the town's subscription library. With his friends, he went on long walks, wrote essays and stories, some of which were published in Constable's The Scots Magazine, and founded a Literary and Debating Society. In early 1804, at the Tontine Hotel, this hosted James Hogg, who was not widely known at the time. Hogg, with two companions, arrived unannounced in Greenock at the start of a tour of the highlands, and was surprised and gratified by the invitation to supper with a large literary community. He remembered Galt as "a tall thin young man, with something a little dandyish in his appearance", dressed in a frock coat and new top-boots, with his shirt collar fashionably high at one side, while the other flapped down, but debating with "such good-nature and such strong emphatic reasoning" as to be "no common youth". The discussion, songs, and stories were "much above what I had ever been accustomed to hear". They became good friends.

Though seemingly doing well, Galt "felt at Greenock as if I was never in my proper element", and was restless about "the narrowness of my prospects". Incensed by an abusive letter, he pursued its author to Leith and got a written apology, then on return told his father and the merchants' firm he intended to quit Greenock. Galt made preparations and, accompanied by his father, took post chaise and mail coach to London in May 1804. Letters of introduction got him, at most, dinner invitations. In 1805 he used an advance of his father's patrimony to fund a partnership with a factor. In 1809 he began studying law at Lincoln's Inn.

During a subsequent trip to Europe, where he was commissioned by a merchant firm to establish trade agreements, Galt met and befriended Lord Byron in Gibraltar. He traveled with Byron and his companion, John Hobhouse, 1st Baron Broughton, to Malta. He met them again in Greece. Parting company, Galt continued alone to Constantinople, Adrianople and then Sofia. He returned to Greenock via Ireland. He then embarked to London to pursue business plans, but these did not come to fruition and he took to writing. Galt wrote an account of his travels, which met with moderate success. Decades later, he would also publish the first full biography of Lord Byron. He also published the first biography of the painter Benjamin West, The Life and Studies of Benjamin West (1816, expanded 1820).

In 1813, Galt attempted to establish a Gibraltarian trading company, in order to circumvent Napoleon's embargo on British trade; however, Wellington's victory in Spain made this no longer necessary. Galt then returned to London and married Elizabeth Tilloch, daughter of Alexander Tilloch. They had three boys, John Galt Jr (1814–1866), Thomas Galt (1815–1901), and Alexander Tilloch Galt (1817–1893). In 1815, he became Secretary of the Royal Caledonian Asylum in London. He also privately consulted in several business ventures.

Galt started to submit articles to Blackwood's Magazine in late 1819, and in March 1829 he sent Blackwood the publishers the plan for "The Ayrshire legatees".

Concentrating on his writing for the next several years, Galt lived at times in London, Glasgow, Edinburgh and elsewhere, writing fiction and a number of school texts under the pseudonym Reverend T. Clark. Around 1821 he moved his family from Greenock to Eskgrove near Musselburgh. In addition to moving his residence frequently during this period, Galt also switched publishers several times, moving from Blackwood's Magazine to Oliver and Boyd and then back again. In 1821 Annals of the parish was published as were two instalments of The steam boat and he started work on the novel Sir André Wylie. Annals of the parish established Galt's reputation overnight. Sir Andrew Wylie was published in 1822.

=== The Canada Company ===
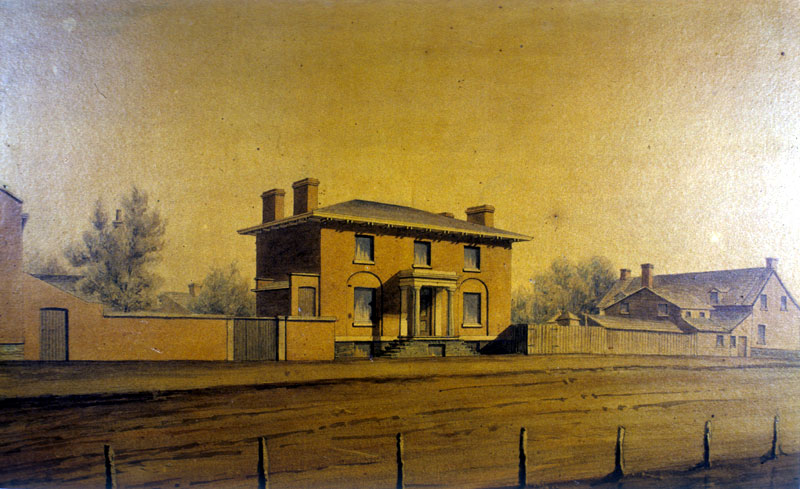
Canada Company office, 1834

In 1824, Galt was appointed secretary of the Canada Company, a charter company established to aid in the colonization of the Huron Tract in Upper Canada along the eastern shore of Lake Huron. After the company was incorporated by royal charter on 19 August 1826, Galt traveled across the Atlantic on the man-of-war HMS Romney, arriving at New York City and then traveling by road. Sadly, soon after arriving, word was sent that his mother had suffered a stroke. He returned to her (in Musselburgh) in 1826 and she died a few months later. He returned to Canada in 1826. While in Canada, Galt lived in York in Upper Canada (now Ontario), but located the headquarters of the Canada Company at Guelph, a town he also founded in 1827. Later that year, he co-founded the town of Goderich with Tiger Dunlop. The community of Galt, Ontario, was named after him.

During his tenure with the Canada Company, Galt ran afoul of several colonial authorities, including Sir Peregrine Maitland, who was Lieutenant-Governor of Upper Canada at the time. His employers grew concerned about his spending and problems with the accounts. In 1828 they sent an accountant to help, and investigate for them. When he left for London with papers. Galt decided to follow and give an explanation to the directors, but at New York early in 1829 found he had been replaced. When Galt reached England on 20 May his creditors had already read the news, and Galt was put in debtors' prison over school fees for his sons.

By the 1830s, the Canada Company was attracting substantial numbers of Scottish settlers to the area around Guelph.

=== Return, debts and health problems ===
On his return to Great Britain, Galt prepared his case for the Company directors, and was given considerable support. On 14 July 1829, he wrote to his friend, the physician David Macbeth Moir, saying he had brought from Canada "book-material", some of which he had sent on to Blackwood for possible publication. At the insistence of his debtors, he then spent several months in King's Bench Prison for failure to pay debts, and used the time to write. After his release in November 1829, he published books including novels set in Canada; Lawrie Todd in 1830, and Bogle Corbet in 1831. He pressed on with his biography of Byron.

Around this time, he began to suffer symptoms of nervous disease. He told Moir In April 1831 that, while still in Canada, he had stumbled and hurt his spine on a tree root. In early April, 1831, he moved with his family to Barn Cottage in Old Brompton. He wrote more novels. The most successful, The Member and its sequel The Radical, reprised the device of being written in the first person by a protagonist, revealing more than they intend, with political corruption as the central theme, drawing on his own recent experiences.

Galt was involved in another colonial business venture, the British American Land Company, which was formed to develop lands in the Eastern Townships of Lower Canada (now Quebec). Galt served as secretary but was forced to resign in December 1832 because of his health. By this stage, his spinal injury was crippling him. A series of strokes affected his speech and handwriting, and he had great difficulty walking. Unable to write, he dictated a two volume Autobiography which sold well.

Galt's three sons returned to Canada in 1833. The eldest, John Jr., would be appointed Collector of Customs and Registrar of Deeds at Goderich and become part of the Colborne Clique. His youngest son Alexander became one of the fathers of Confederation and Canada's first minister of finance.

=== Return to Scotland ===
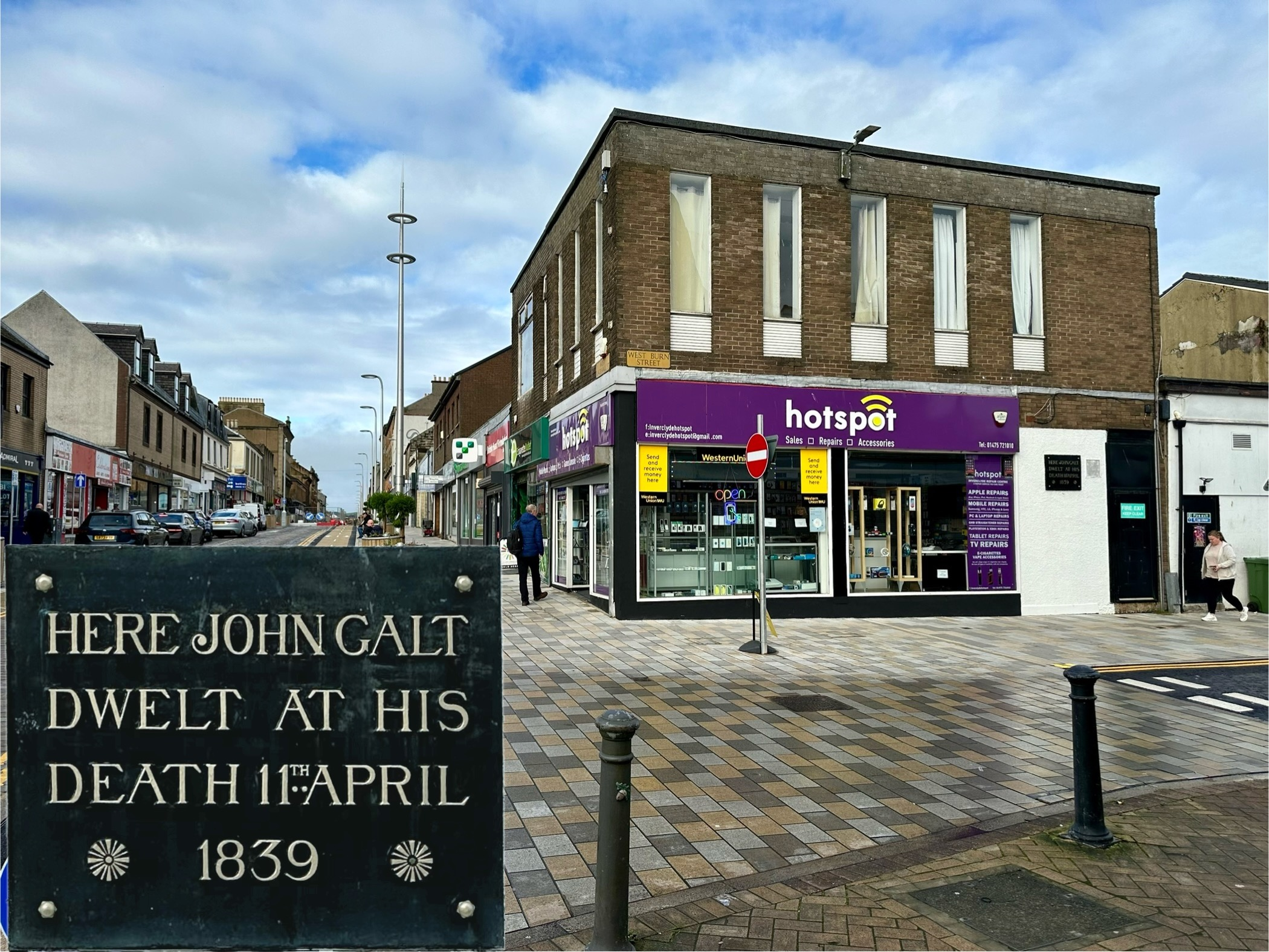
Plaque on modern building which occupies the plot in Greenock where his father had the family house built in 1790, marking the garden entrance from Westburn Street to the upstairs flat where Galt died.

In December 1833, having gone through his papers and found early work of interest, Galt took up Moir's suggestion and began what became his three volume Literary Life and Miscellanies, and planned to return to Scotland while still sufficiently able.

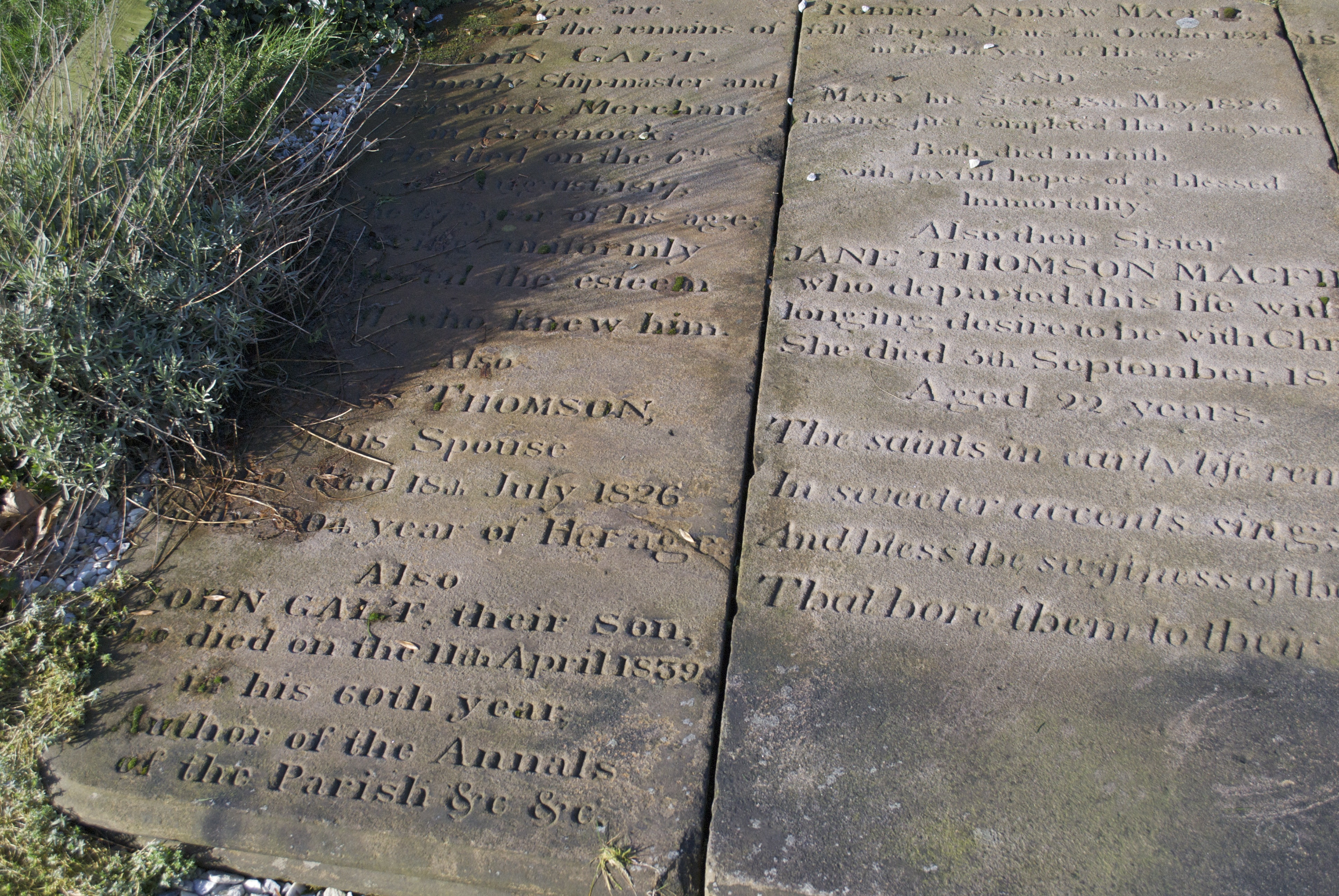
The Galt family tomb, inscribed to John Galt, "Author of The Annals of the Parish &c &c."

He retired to his old home in Greenock in August 1834 following the departure of three of his sons to Canada. Finding the accommodation unsuitable he lived temporarily in Gourock before moving in December 1834 to a more comfortable house, sited in central Greenock on Westburn Street, at its corner with West Blackhall Street. He stayed there with his wife and sister. Galt died on 11 April 1839, and was buried in the family tomb of his parents in the New Burying Ground in Greenock (now called the Old Greenock Cemetery or Inverkip Street Cemetery).

== Commemoration ==
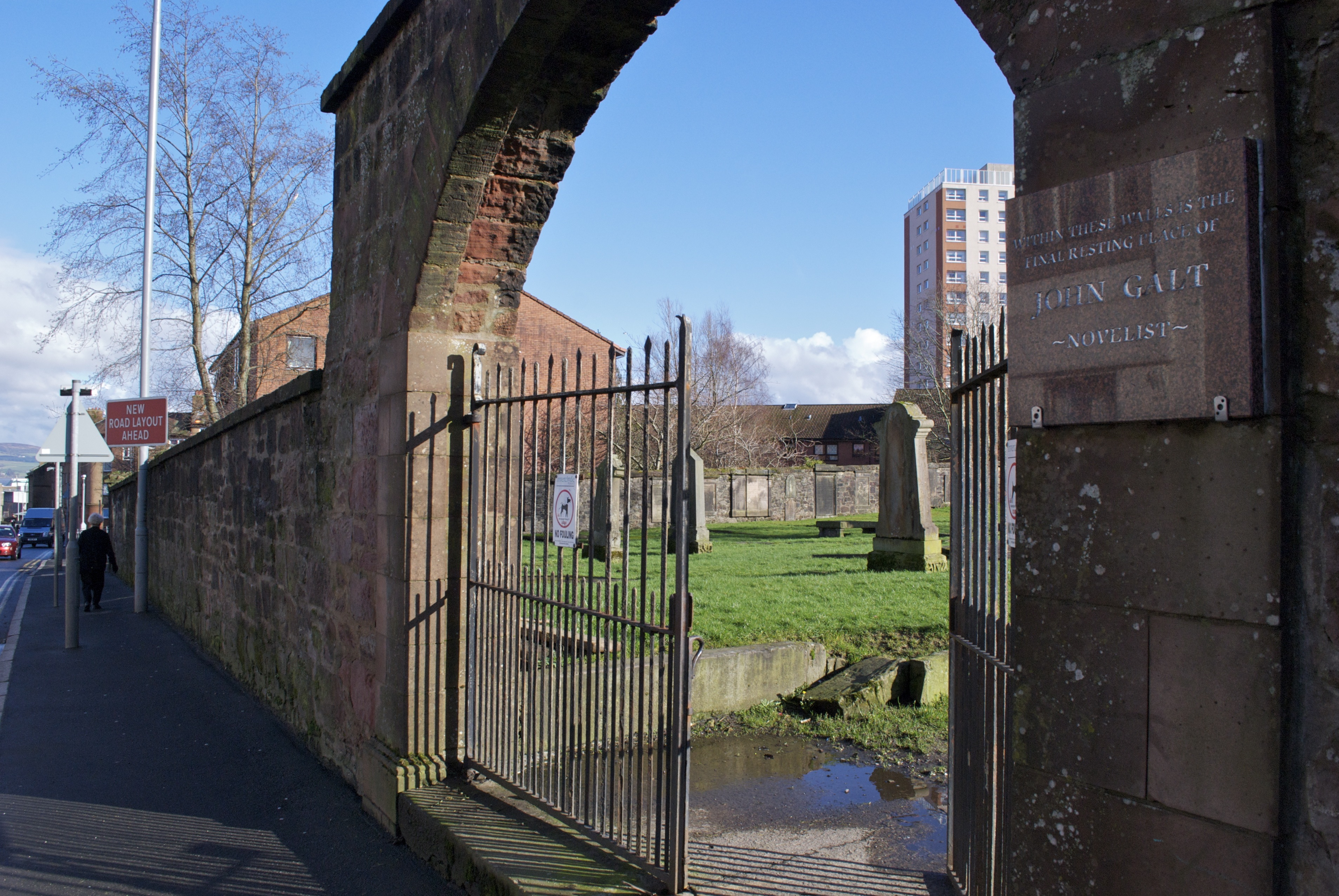
The old Greenock cemetery entrance from Inverkip Street, with a plaque commemorating John Galt, and in the immediate background John Galt House

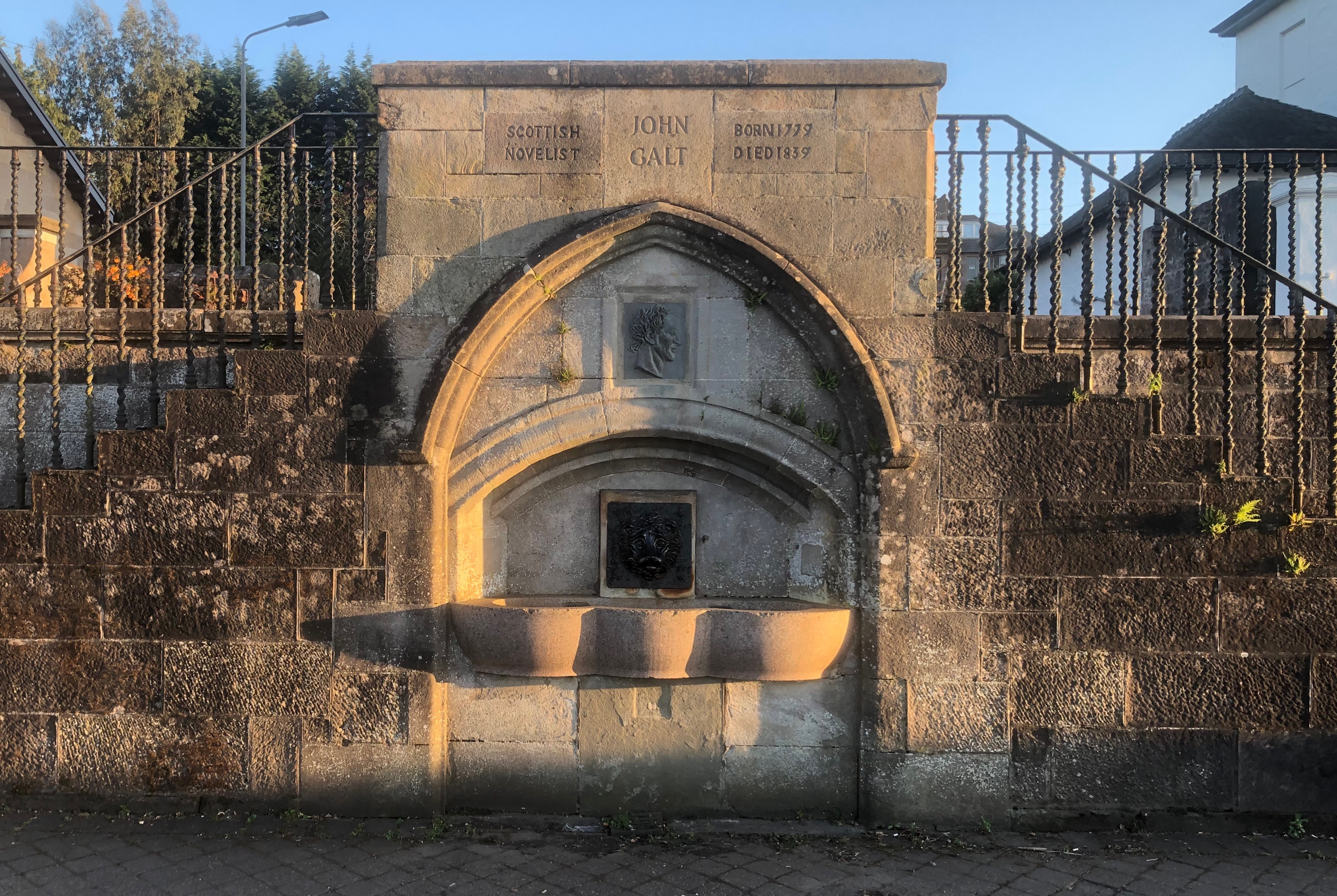
John Galt memorial fountain at Greenock Esplanade

In Greenock, John Galt is commemorated by the John Galt memorial fountain on the Esplanade, and by a plaque at the old cemetery where he is buried. Sheltered housing (for seniors) built next to the cemetery in 1988, on the site of the old Greenock Royal Infirmary, is named John Galt House in his honour.

He is also commemorated in Makars' Court, outside The Writers' Museum, Lawnmarket, Edinburgh. The paving slab is engraved with the Scots language words "birr and smeddum" (vigour and liveliness) quoting his 1821 book Annals of the Parish.

The city of Galt, Ontario was named after John Galt, but was absorbed into Cambridge, Ontario in 1973. His original home in Guelph, known as the "Priory" (built 1827–1828), stood on the banks of the Speed River near the current River Run Centre for performing arts. The building later became the first Canadian Pacific Railway station in the city; the conversion was completed in 1888. The building was no longer required by the Canadian Pacific Railway which built a new station in 1910. A photograph from 1914 depicts it as boarded up. In spite of attempts by various individuals in Guelph to save the structure, it was torn down in 1926.

A historical plaque commemorates Galt's role with the Canada Company in populating the Huron Tract, calling it "the most important single attempt at settlement in Canadian history". In 2006, the community of Guelph proclaimed the first Monday in August, "John Galt Day".

== Works ==
Galt's novels are best known for their depiction of Scottish rural life, tinged with ironic humour. Galt wrote the following works:

- Cursory Reflections on Political and Commercial Topics (1812)
- The Life and Administration of Cardinal Wolsey (1812)
- The Tragedies of Maddelen, Agamemnon, Lady Macbeth, Antonia and Clytemnestra (1812)
- Voyages and Travels (1812)
- Letters from the Levant (1813)
- The Mermaid (1814)
- The Life and Studies of Benjamin West (1816)
- The Majolo (2 volumes) (1816)
- The Appeal (1818)
- The Star of Destiny (a three act play, 1818)
- The History of Gog and Magog: The Champions of London (children's book, 1819)
- The Wandering Jew (1820)
- The Earthquake (3 volumes) (1820)
- Glenfell (1820)
- The Life, Studies and Works of Benjamin West (1820)
- Annals of the Parish (1821)
- The Ayrshire Legatees (1821)
- Sir Andrew Wylie, of that Ilk (3 volumes) (1822)
- The Provost (1822)
- The English Mother's Catechism for her Children (1822)
- The Steam-Boat (1822)
- The Entail (3 volumes) (1823)
- The Gathering of the West (1823)
- Ringan Gilhaize (The Covenanters) (3 volumes) (1823)
- The Spaewife (3 volumes) (1823)
- The Bachelor's Wife (1824)
- Rothelan (3 volumes) (1824)
- The Omen (1825)
- The Last of the Lairds (1826)
- Lawrie Todd or The Settlers in the Woods (1830)
- The Life of Lord Byron (1830)
- Southennan (3 volumes) (1830)
- The Book of Life (1831)
- The Black Ferry (variant of The Book of Life)
- Bogle Corbet or The Emigrants (3 volumes) (1831)
- The Lives of the Players (1831)
- The Member: An Autobiography (1832) – novel
- The Radical (1832) – novel, sequel to The Member
- Stanley Buxton (3 volumes) (1832)
- Autobiography (2 volumes) (1833)
- Eben Erskine or The Traveller (3 volumes) (1833)
- The Ouranoulagos or The Celestial Volume (1833)
- Poems (1833)
- The Stolen Child (1833)
- Stories of the Study (3 volumes) (1833)
- Literary Life and Miscellanies (3 volumes) (1834)
- A Contribution to the Greenock Calamity Fund (1834)
- Efforts by an Invalid (1835)
- The Demon of Destiny and Other Poems (1839)
