= Alexander Tilloch =

Scottish inventor (1759–1825)

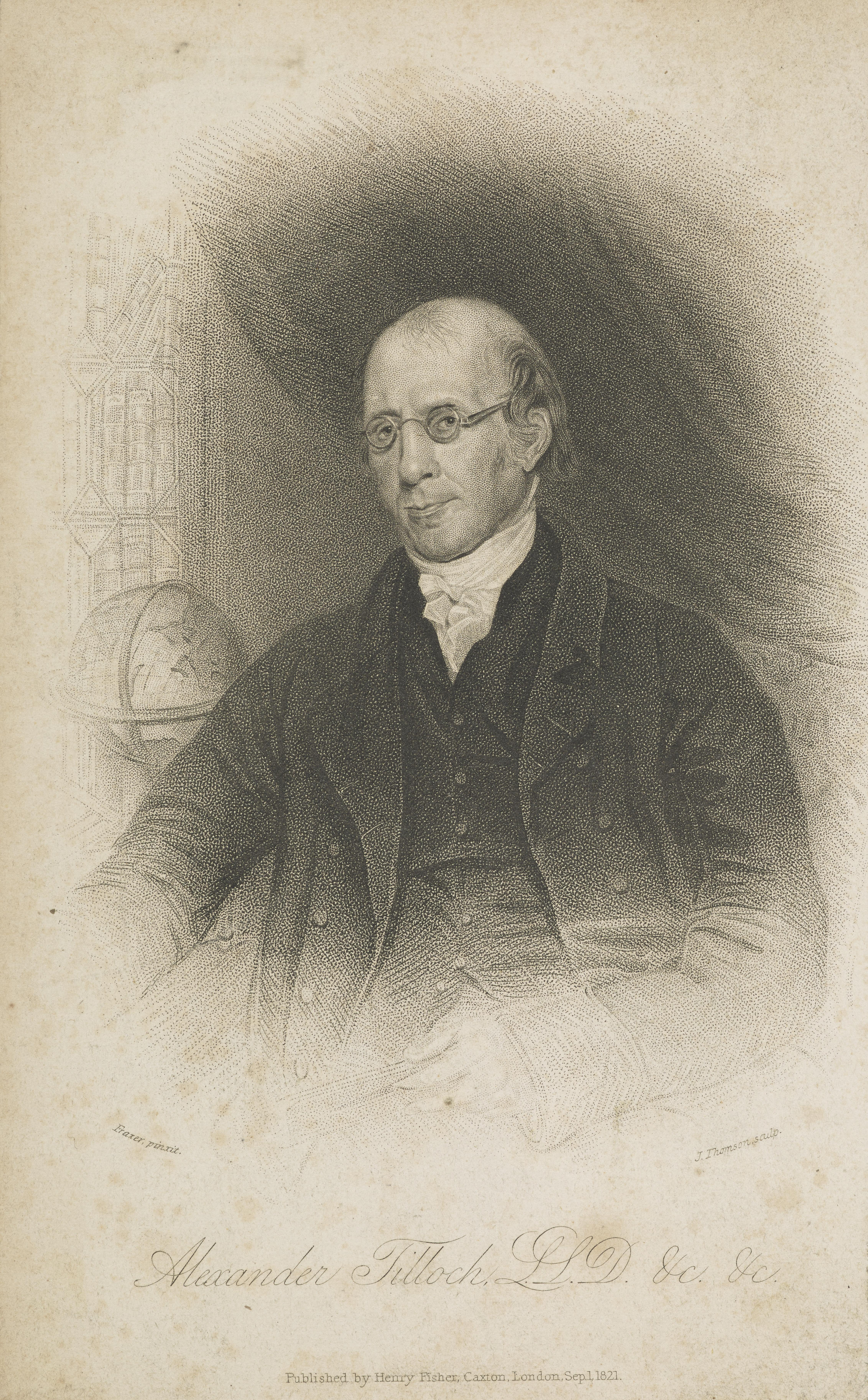
- Engraving of Tilloch by James Thomson, published 1821
- Born: 28 February 1759; Glasgow, Scotland
- Died: 26 January 1825 (aged 65); Islington, London, England
- Education: Glasgow University
- Known for: Founder of Philosophical Magazine
- Spouse: Margaret Simpson
- Children: 2
- Parent: John Tilloch
- Relatives: Alexander Tilloch Galt (grandson)

Alexander Tilloch FSA (Scot) (28 February 1759 – 1825) was a Scottish journalist and inventor. He founded the Philosophical Magazine.

== Early life ==
The son of John Tilloch, a tobacco merchant and magistrate of Glasgow, he was born there on 28 February 1759. He was educated at Glasgow University, and turned his attention to printing.

In 1781, he began work on stereotypes. In 1725, William Ged had obtained a privilege for a development of Van der Mey's process, but encountered practical difficulties. Tilloch independently developed a process by 1782, and worked with Andrew Foulis the younger, printer to the university of Glasgow. On 28 April 1784, they took out a joint patent for England (No. 1431) for ‘printing books from plates instead of movable types,’ and another for Scotland about the same time. They made no great use of it, however. From Tilloch, Earl Stanhope derived knowledge of the process of making stereotype plates.

== In London ==
In 1787, Tilloch moved to London, and in 1789, in connection with others, purchased The Star, an evening daily paper, of which he remained editor until 1821. At that time forgery of Bank of England notes was common, and Tilloch in 1790 laid before the British ministry a mode of printing which would render forgery impossible. Receiving no encouragement, he brought his process before the notice of the Commission d'Assignats of the Legislative Assembly, at Paris, but then came the outbreak of war. In 1797 he submitted to the Bank of England a specimen of a note engraved after his plan, accompanied by a certificate signed by Francesco Bartolozzi, Wilson Lowry, William Sharp and other engravers, to the effect that they did not believe it could be copied by any of the known arts of engraving. He could not, however, persuade the authorities to accept it, though in 1810 they adopted the process of Augustus Applegath, which Tilloch claimed in 1820, in a petition to parliament, to be virtually his own.

In 1797, he projected and established the Philosophical Magazine, a journal devoted to scientific subjects, and intended for the publication of new discoveries and inventions. He devoted much of his time to the conduct of the magazine, of which he remained sole proprietor until 1822, when Richard Taylor became associated with him. The only previous journal of this nature in London was the Journal of Natural Philosophy, Chemistry, and the Arts, founded by William Nicholson in 1797. It was incorporated with Tilloch's Magazine in 1813.

On 20 August 1808 Tilloch took out a patent (No. 3161) for ‘apparatus to be employed as a moving power to drive machinery and mill work.’

== Later life ==
In later life Tilloch devoted attention to scriptural prophecy, joined the Sandemanians, and occasionally preached to a congregation in Goswell Street. On 11 January 1825 he took out a patent (No. 5066) for improvements in the ‘steam engine or apparatus connected therewith,’ and it is stated that the engineer, Arthur Woolf took up his suggestions. Tilloch was a member of numerous learned societies at home and on the continent, among others of the Scottish Society of Antiquaries, and of the Regia Academia Scientiarum of Munich. He collected manuscripts, coins, and medals, of which he left a considerable number.

He died in Barnsbury Street, Islington, on 26 January 1825. His wife, Margaret née Simpson, (1760–1783) died following the birth of a second child, who also died, leaving a daughter, Elizabeth (1781–1851), who later married John Galt.

== Works ==
Tilloch was the author of:

- ‘Dissertation on the opening of the Sealed Book,’ Arbroath; 2nd edit. Perth, 1852; printed from a series of papers published in the ‘Star’ in 1808–9, signed ‘Biblicus.’ From the introduction it appears that the papers were intended to deal with the whole Book of Revelation.
- ‘Dissertations introductory to the Study and right Understanding of the Apocalypse,’ London, 1823.

Tilloch also edited the ‘Mechanic's Oracle,’ commenced in July 1824 and discontinued soon after his death.

== Notes ==
Attribution

This article incorporates text from a publication now in the public domain: "Tilloch, Alexander". Dictionary of National Biography. London: Smith, Elder & Co. 1885–1900.
