= Journal of Natural Philosophy, Chemistry, and the Arts =

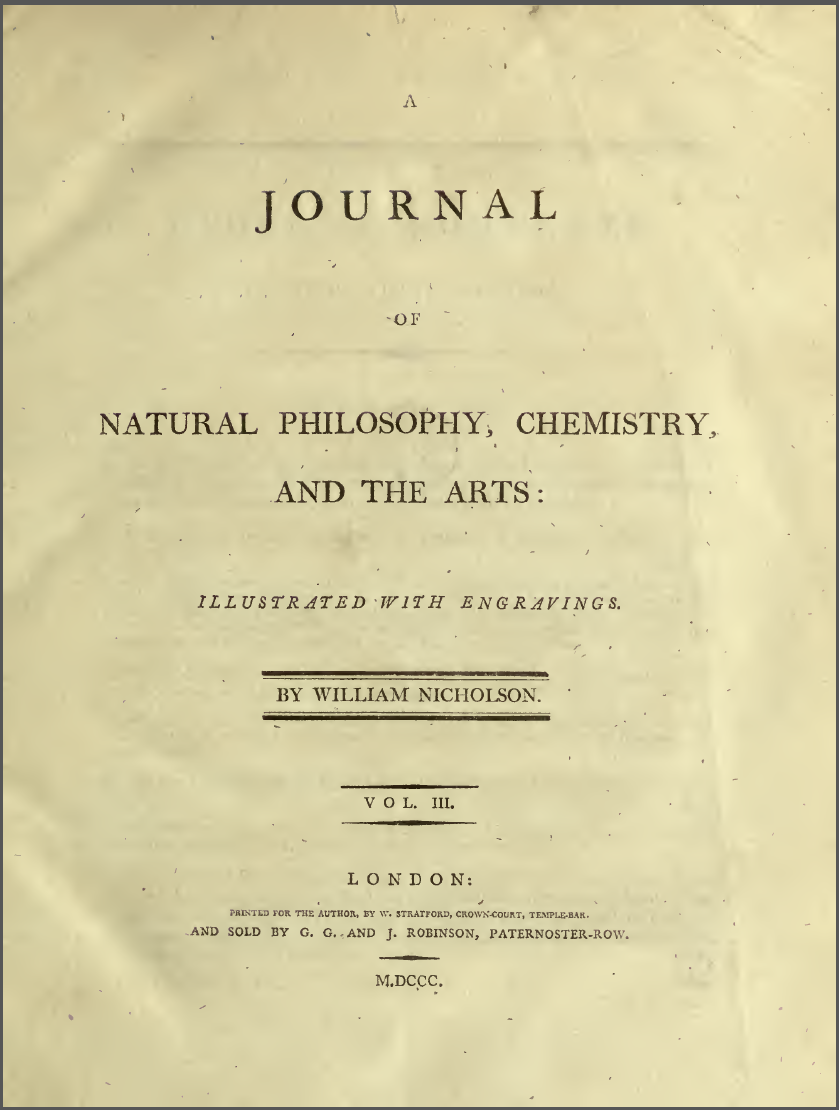
Title page of 1799-1800 volume

A Journal of Natural Philosophy, Chemistry, and the Arts, generally known as Nicholson's Journal, was the first monthly scientific journal in Great Britain. William Nicholson began it in 1797 and was the editor until it merged with another journal in January 1814.

Nicholson's journal would accept short papers, written by new or anonymous authors, and decide whether to publish them relatively quickly. These attributes distinguished the new journal from the established scientific journal The Philosophical Transactions of the Royal Society. By one account this less-formal model was so appealing that the next year (1798) a similar startup launched, Alexander Tilloch's Philosophical Magazine, and in January 1813, a further rival, Thomas Thomson's Annals of Philosophy.

== Significant articles ==
- Nicholson and Anthony Carlisle split water into hydrogen and oxygen for the first time in 1800 and immediately published their results in the journal. They used Volta's pile (an electric battery) as soon as they learned of it to achieve this electrolysis.
- Discovery of the element palladium was announced in 1803. The author chose Nicholson's journal in order to remain anonymous at first, and later revealed himself to be William Hyde Wollaston.
- The journal published the first known aerodynamic analysis of gliders and heavier-than-air fixed-wing flying machines designs, by George Cayley in 1809–1810.

== Publishing business ==
By one account, William Nicholson started the journal and made all editorial decisions in a "pioneering and uncertain attempt" to make a living from publishing it. Revenues came only from subscriptions. Tilloch's Philosophical Magazine was more successful as a popular science journal business than Nicholson's journal, according to one source, and another such journal appeared in 1813 (Annals of Philosophy). Possibly partly because of this competition, William Nicholson ended the journal. By some accounts Nicholson's journal simply ceased, and by others it merged in 1814 with the Philosophical Magazine to form The Philosophical Magazine and Journal.

The "Advertisement", dated 31 December 1813, at the start of Volume 42 of The Philosophical Magazine. states:

"Nearly seventeen years have elapsed since The Philosophical Journal was commenced by Mr. Nicholson, and sixteen since the appearance of the first number of The Philosophical Magazine. [...] [T]he result of [...] deliberations [between the publishers of Nicholson's Philosophical Journal and The Philosophical Magazine in order to respond to readers' complaints regarding duplication of material in the two publications] has been that it would certainly be best that we should unite, and that the joint product of our exertions and our correspondence should be consolidated in one periodical work. [...] The Philosophical Journal will henceforth be discontinued; and The Philosophical Magazine will be conducted by William Nicholson and Alexander Tilloch, in the same manner as it has always been carried on."

For the duration of Volume 43 (January to June 1814) the joint publishers of the new merged journal provided duplicate title-pages for each number, ostensibly so that subscribers to Nicholson's Philosophical Magazine might be enabled to "preserve their Series without a chasm." However, despite their intention to continue this scheme of two-fold numeration, they abandoned it at the end of this trial period in June 1814, because of the perceived "confusion and risque of many errors" when referring to future volumes; from July 1814 a single numeration was used, following the numbering of The Philosophical Magazine.

== Bibliography and archives ==
Complete journal issues have been scanned and are available online at the Biodiversity Heritage Library and at archive.org thanks to the Natural History Museum Library, London, the New York Public Library and google books.
