= William Nicholson (chemist) =

English chemist and writer (1753–1815)

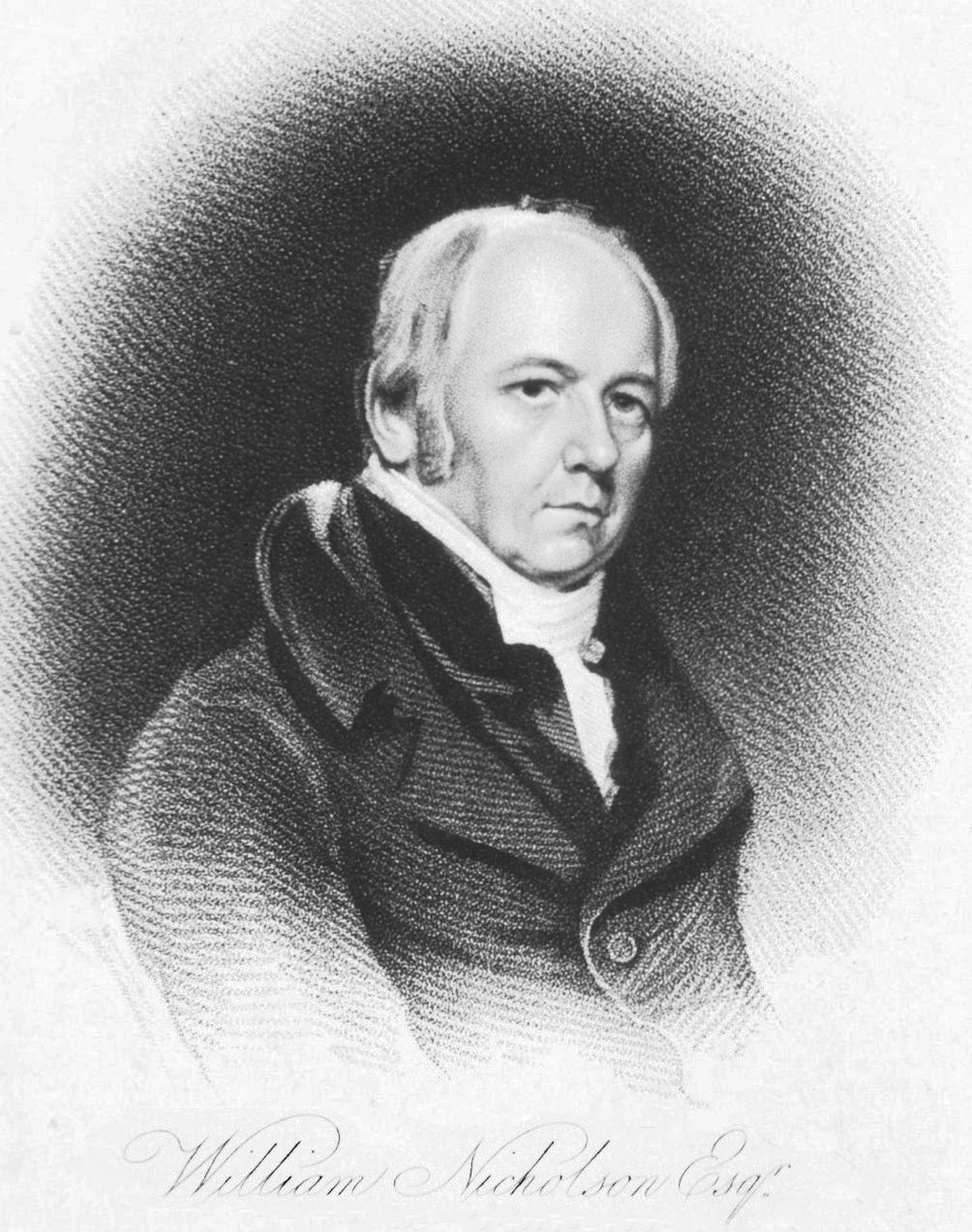
- William Nicholson, c. 1811}
- Born: 13 December 1753
- Died: 21 May 1815 (aged 61); Bloomsbury
- Known for: First to achieve electrolysis
- Scientific career
- Fields: Writing, scientist, inventor, civil engineer
- Workplaces: East India Company, Amsterdam, General Chamber of Manufacturers of Great Britain

William Nicholson (13 December 1753 – 21 May 1815) was an English writer, translator, publisher, scientist, inventor, patent agent and civil engineer. He launched the first monthly scientific journal in Britain, Journal of Natural Philosophy, Chemistry, and the Arts, in 1797, and remained its editor until 1814. In 1800, he and Anthony Carlisle were the first to achieve electrolysis, the splitting of water into hydrogen and oxygen, using a voltaic pile. Nicholson also wrote extensively on natural philosophy and chemistry.

== Early life ==
Nicholson was educated in Yorkshire, and after leaving school, he made two voyages as a midshipman in the service of the British East India Company. His first voyage was to India and the second voyage was to China on board the Gatton, (1772–1773).

Subsequently, having become acquainted with Josiah Wedgwood in 1775, he moved to Amsterdam, where he made a living for a few years as Wedgwood's agent.

On his return to England he was persuaded by Thomas Holcroft to apply his writing talents to the composition of light literature for periodicals, while also assisting Holcroft with some of his plays and novels – Alwyn and Duplicity.

Meanwhile, he devoted himself to the preparation of An Introduction to Natural Philosophy, which was published in 1782 by Joseph Johnson and was at once successful. Translations for Joseph Johnson included Voltaire's Elements of the Philosophy of Newton as well as M. Maistre de La Tour's History of Hyder Shah in 1784. He then published The Navigator's Assistant based on his time with the East India Company .

In 1784 he was proposed by Josiah Wedgwood (the current chairman) and appointed as secretary to the General Chamber of Manufacturers of Great Britain, and he was also connected with the Society for the Encouragement of Naval Architecture, established in 1791.

== Scientific work ==
On 12 December 1783, Nicholson was elected to the "Chapter Coffee House Philosophical Society". He was proposed by Jean-Hyacinthe Magellan and seconded by horologist John Whitehurst.

Nicholson communicated to the Royal Society in 1789 two papers on electrical subjects. In the same year he reviewed the controversy which had arisen over Richard Kirwan's essay on phlogiston, and published a translation of the adverse commentaries by the French academicians (Lavoisier, Monge, Berthollet, and Guyton de Morveau) as 'An Essay on Phlogiston, to which are added Notes.'

Nicholson's Hydrometer

In 1784 he invented the Nicholson hydrometer, a constant volume hydrometer to measure specific gravity of liguids or solids, with a pan for small weights on top and a small container ("basket") on the bottom into which a sample can be placed.

in 1790, William Nicholson obtained a patent for a cylindrical printing machine – a design which was copied in the US and Barcelona, before Friedrich Koenig developed and commercialised the concept in 1814.

In 1797 he founded, published, and wrote part of the Journal of Natural Philosophy, Chemistry and the Arts, generally known as Nicholson's Journal, the earliest monthly scientific work of its kind in Great Britain. The journal published the first known aerodynamic analysis of gliders and heavier-than-air fixed-wing flying machines designs, by George Cayley in 1809–1810. The publication continued until 1814.

Nicholson held a life-long interest in horology, and he became good friends with clockmakers Edward Nairne and J.H. de Magellan. Between April 1797 and August 1799, he wrote four papers of his own on the aspects of timekeeping and throughout his editorship of the Journal (between 1797 and 1813) he published numerous papers by others on the topic. Nicholson had at least two clocks made to his own designs, and his innovations include ‘creating new types of escapement and temperature compensation for pendulum clocks’. One, a skeleton clock, is privately owned. The other is a table regulator with Nicholson's own form of gravity escapement, dated 1797, in the Ilbert Collection at the British Museum. Described as ‘a unique piece’ with ‘a movement of most unusual and interesting design it has also been called ‘one of the most ingenious’ early pendulum temperature compensators.

In 1799 he established a school in London's Soho Square, where he taught natural philosophy and chemistry, with the aid of a grant of £1,500 from Thomas Pitt.

Nicholson and Anthony Carlisle demonstrated sustained electrolysis of water into hydrogen and oxygen using a voltaic pile for the first time in May 1800. The two were then appointed to a chemical investigation committee of the new Royal Institution. But his own interests shortly turned elsewhere. In 1809 he became a first class corresponding member, living abroad, of the Royal Institute of the Netherlands.

Besides considerable contributions to the Philosophical Transactions, Nicholson wrote translations of Fourcroy's Chemistry (1787) and Chaptal's Chemistry (1788), First Principles of Chemistry (1788) and a Chemical Dictionary (1795); he also edited the British Encyclopedia, or Dictionary of Arts and Sciences (6 vols., London, 1809). A sceptical critique of biblical miracles, The Doubts of Infidels, though published anonymously, is attributed to Nicholson.

== Later life ==
During the later years of his life, Nicholson's attention was chiefly directed to water supply engineering at Portsmouth, at Gosport and in Hammersmith. William Nicholson died in Bloomsbury at the age of 61 on 21 May 1815, attended by Sir Anthony Carlisle.

== See also ==
- Timeline of hydrogen technologies
