= List of Rees's Cyclopædia articles =

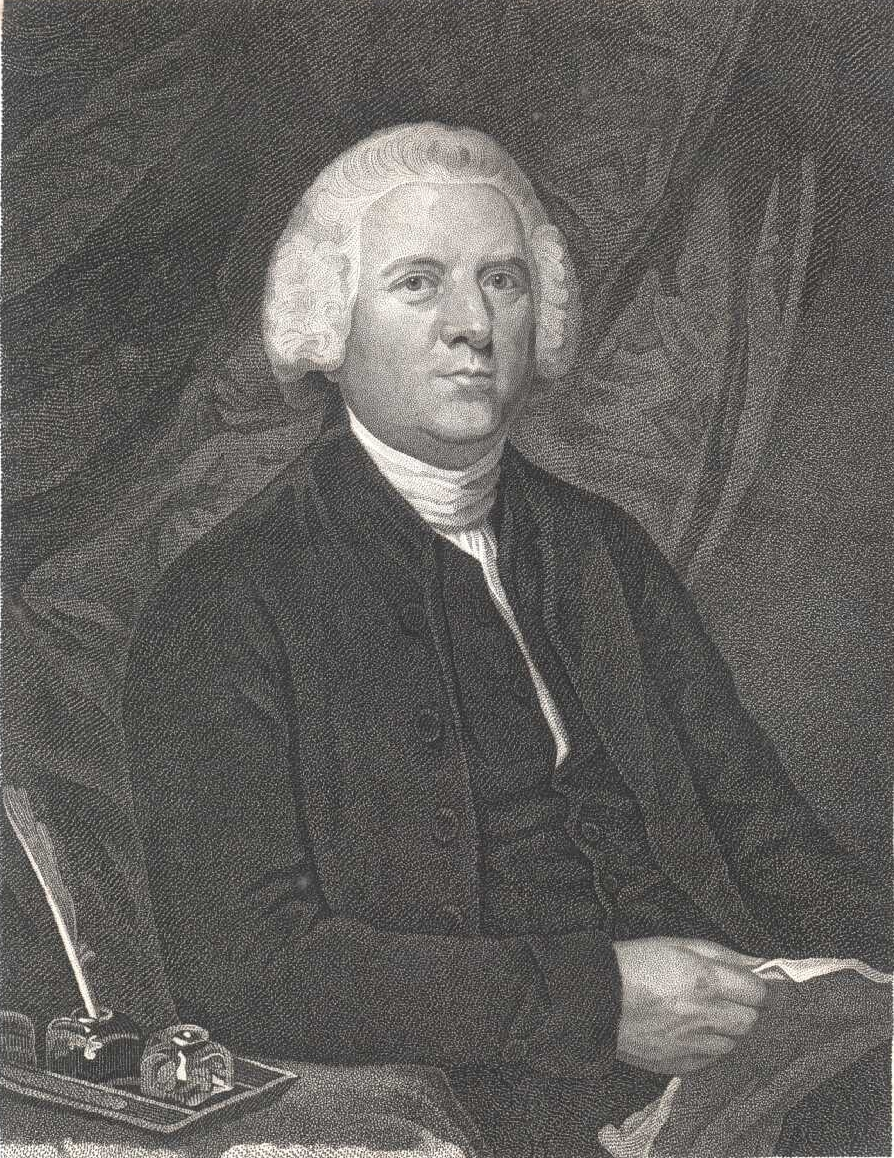
Abraham Rees (1743–1825), compiler of Rees's Cyclopædia.

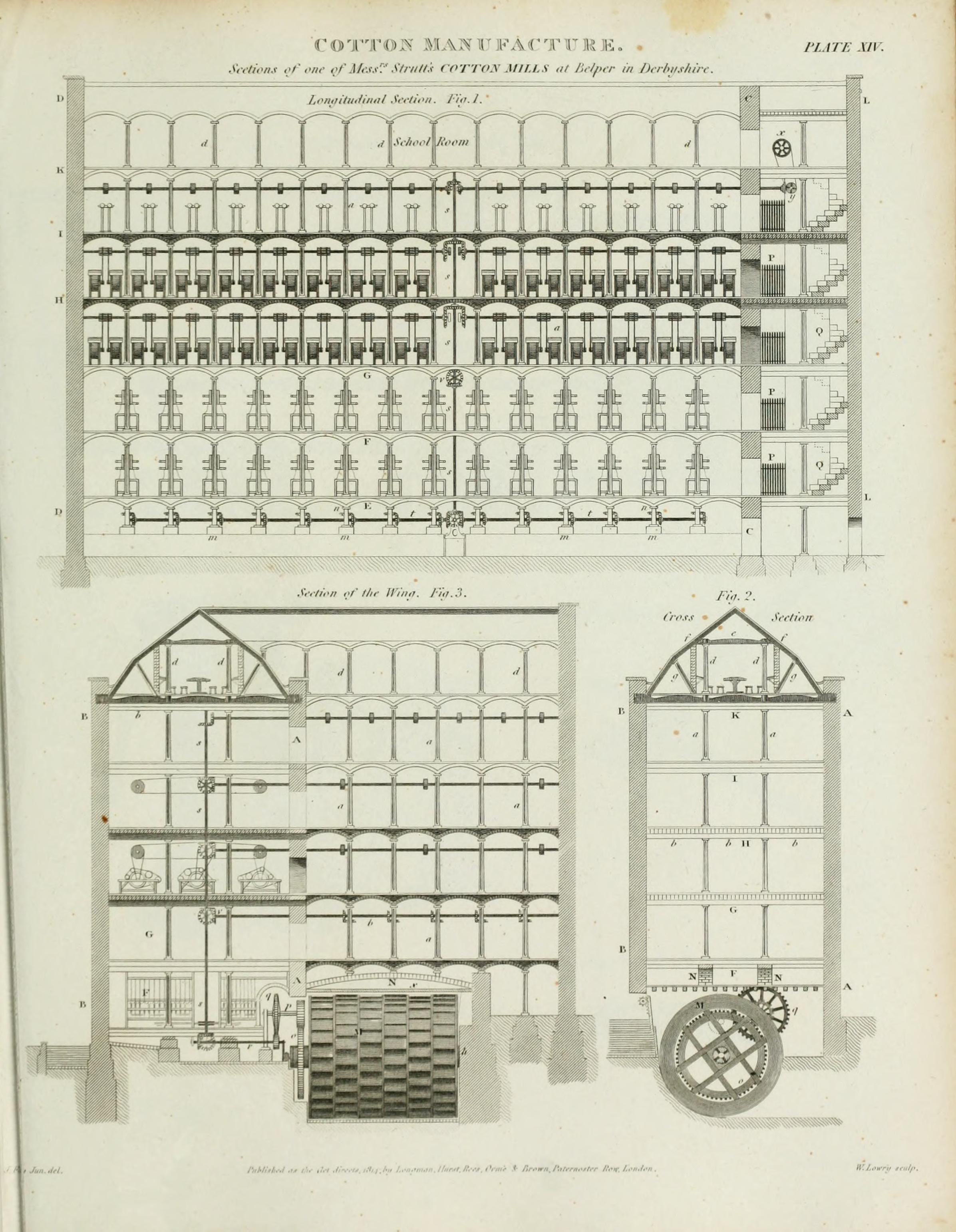
Jedediah Strutt, North Mill at Belper, Derbyshire. Rees's Cyclopædia, 1802–1819. Drawn by John Farey, jr, and engraved by Wilson Lowry.

The Cyclopædia; or, Universal Dictionary of Arts, Sciences, and Literature is an important 19th century British encyclopaedia edited by Rev. Abraham Rees (1743–1825), a Presbyterian minister and scholar who had edited previous editions of Chambers's Cyclopædia. Many major scholars of the day contributed. Scientific theorising about the atomic system, geological succession, and earth origins; natural history (botany, entomology, ornithology and zoology); and developments In technology, particularly In textiles manufacture, are all reflected in the Cyclopædia. Serially published from 1802 to 1820, the Cyclopædia was criticised for its idiosyncratic topic selection and alphabetization standards. Hostile reviews in the Anti-Jacobin Review (1802–1805) complained about its supposed anti-religious aspects and radical standpoints attributed to its editor and contributors, and cited lack of article balance, confusing alphabetization, and cross-references to then-unpublished volumes. The British Critic less stridently criticised lack of balance and confusion. The Quarterly Review commented in 1863, "Rees is the most extensive cyclopædia in English with many excellent articles it has generally been condemned as on the whole too diffuse and too commonplace." In 1948 Percy Scholes published his biography The Great Dr Burney, 2 vol., and devoted a chapter to Charles Burney's work for Rees, discussing in some detail the faults of the work, in particular, the way the serial production caused major problems when editors were faced with new knowledge that appeared after the volume containing the appropriate section had been issued. They addressed this partially with an appendix in the last volume.

The Rees Project, was instigated by Professor June Zimmerman Fullmer, who independently indexed the Cyclopædia. After tapping the invisible college of scholars who knew of Rees, she convened a summer 1986 meeting in London, following which she wrote a proposal to the American Foundation for the Humanities for funding to the project, setting out the object of producing a printed concordance to the contents of the Cyclopædia. This was intended to make Rees much more widely accessible to the modern reader. Funding was not forthcoming, and the matter lapsed.

The Cyclopædia lacks a classified index volume. In 1820, Philosophical Magazine analysed the work's contents by half-volume publication dates, as proper priority had not been given to serially published scientific discoveries. The following are notable topics covered by the Cyclopædia (containing over 15 columns).

Notes: In the original Cyclopædia, the letters I and J are treated as identical, as are U and V, following ancient Latin conventions; each pair forms one sequence in the alphabetical order of the articles. Two-year dating of volumes indicates separate publication dates for half-volumes. Contributors' names have been attributed based on the 1820 analysis.

== Volume 1 ==
A – Amaranthides Vol 1, 1802

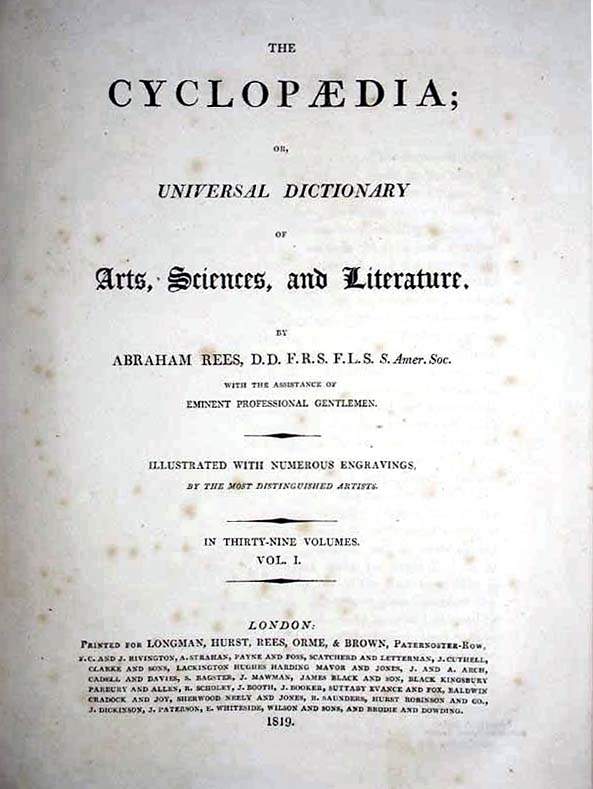
The title page from the work, issued 1919.

Article	Classification	Columns	Contributor/Notes
Abyssinia	Geography	23.3	
Academy	Miscellaneous	17.5	
Aerostation	Natural Philosophy	27.2	
Aetna	Geography	26.2	
Affinity	Chemistry	26.9	
Africa	Geography	18.3	
Air	Physics	19.4	
Alexander the Great	Biography	23.4	
Algebra	Algebra	22.8	
Algiers	Geography	23.0	
Aleppo	Geography	19.5	
Allium	Botany	18.6	William Wood

== Volume 2 ==
Amarantus – Arteriotomy Vol 2, 1802/3

Article	Classification	Columns	Contributor/Notes
America	History	30.7	
Amphitheatre	Architecture	15.0	
Amputation	Surgery	31.2	
Anatomy, veterinary	Comparative anatomy	35.0	
Anatomy	Anatomy	29.0	
Aneurism	Surgery	18.9	
Annuities	Annuities	16.0	William Morgan
Antimony	Chemistry	21.0	
Arabia	Geography	27.3	
Arsenic	Chemistry	20.6	

== Volume 3 ==
Artery – Battersea Vol 3, 1803/4

Article	Classification	Columns	Contributor/Notes
Asia	Geography	25.1	
Astronomy	Astronomy	18.3	
Athens	Geography	80.5	
Atmosphere	Natural Philosophy	38.1	Abraham Rees
Banks	Commerce	24.3	
Barometer	Meteorology	68.2	
Basso-Relievo	Sculpture	15.6	John Flaxman
Battalion	War	64.2	

== Volume 4 ==
Battery – Bookbinding Vol 4, 1804/5

Article	Classification	Columns	Contributor/Notes
Battle	War	22.2	
Bees	Natural History	26.3	
Bible	Scripture	78.5	
Bird	Ornithology	125.8	Edward Donovan
Birman Empire	Geography	23.3	
Bishop	Ecclesiastical History	21.3	
Bleaching	Technology	25.4	Charles Taylor
Blindness	Medicine	17.3	
Blowing & Blastfurnaces	Technology	45.2	David Mushet
Blowing Machine	Machine	29.1	David Mushet
Boat	Naval & Marine	23.6	George Glover; possibly pseudonymous
Book	Misc	25.2	

== Volume 5 ==
Book-keeping – Calvart Vol 5, 1805

Article	Classification	Columns	Contributor/Notes
Book-keeping	Business	50.8	
Bounty	Commerce	15.8	
Brain	Anatomy	18.9	
Bridge	Architecture	23.0	
Calculus	Mathematics	24.6	

== Volume 6 ==
Calvary – Castra Vol 6, 1806

Article	Classification	Columns	Contributor/Notes
Camelus	Zoology	18.6	
Camp	War	18.2	
Campanula	Botany	18.7	
Canal	Civil Engineering	289.0	John Farey, Sr.; the longest article in the work
Cancer	Zoology	32.0	
Cannon	Artillery - War	60.4	
Canon	Religion	21.8	
Carabus	Entomology	22.0	Edward Donovan
Carduus	Botany	19.7	William Wood
Carex	Botany	37.1	William Wood
Carbon	Chemistry	18.5	
Carriage	Artillery - War	26.6	James Glenie
Carthaginian	Ancient history	36.7	

== Volume 7 ==
Castramentation – Chronology Vol 7, 1806/7

Article	Classification	Columns	Contributor/Notes
Castrametation	War	18.6	James Glenie?
Cataract	Surgery	23.5	
Catherine II	Biography	28.0	
Cattle	Agriculture	38.9	Richard Watson Dickson
Cause	Philosophy	15.1	
Center	Mechanics	49.1	
Centaurea	Botany	20.5	William Wood
Cerambyx	Entomology	37.2	Edward Donovan
Cervix	Zoology	16.0	
Ceylon	Geography	33.6	
Chance	Probabilities	44.0	
Chimney	Architecture	14.8	
China	Geography	65.0	
Chronology	Chronology	110.0	

== Volume 8 ==
Chronometer – Colliseum Vol 8, 1807

Article	Classification	Columns	Contributor/Notes
Chronometer	Horology	112.7	William Pearson
Church	Religion	38.0	
Cicero	Biography	20.6	
Cimex	Entomology	15.5	Edward Donovan
Cipher	Cryptography	59.9	William Blair
Circle	Astronomy	70.5	William Pearson
Circulation of the blood	Anatomy	24.2	
Cistus	Botany	20.2	William Wood
Classification	Natural history	75.0	
Climate	Geography	26.6	
Clock	Horology	118.6	William Pearson
Clover	Agriculture	19.0	Richard Watson Dickson
Coal	Natural history	75.0	John Farey, Sr.
Coast	Geography	15.2	
Cochin China	Geography	16.1	
Coin	Commerce	23.	Patrick Kelly
Cold	Physiology	25.0	

== Volume 9 ==
Collision – Corne Vol 9, 1807/8

Article	Classification	Columns	Contributor/Notes
Colony	Government	29.4	
Colour-making in Calico Printing	Natural Philosophy	30.7	James Thomson
Coluber	Zoology	36.7	
Columba	Orinithology	14.9	Edward Donovan
Comet	Astronomy	35.8	
Commerce	Commerce	25.1	
Common	Agriculture	27.3	
Compass	Natural Philosophy	16.9	
Compensation-Balance	Horology	31.1	William Pearson
Composition in painting	Painting	15.6	John Flaxman
Conchology	Conchology	64.1	Edward Donovan
Concord	Music	16.9	John Farey, Sr.
Conferva	Botany	16.8	William Wood
Conic Sections	Mathematics	32.0	James Ivory
Construction	Military	65.3	James Glenie
Convolvulus	Botany	28.0	William Wood
Conyza	Botany	15.5	William Wood
Cook, James	Biography	43.9	
Copper	Mineralogy	29.7	
Corn Laws	Rural Economy	63.1	Richard Watson Dickson?

== Volume 10 ==
Cornea – Czyrcassy Vol 10, 1808

Article	Classification	Columns	Contributor/Notes
Cottage farm	Rural Economy	15.0	Richard Watson Dickson?
Cottage	Rural economy	18.7	Richard Watson Dickson?
Cotton manufacture	Commerce	35.2	James Thomson; revisited in 1812 as "Manufacture of cotton"
Court	Law	37.2	
Cranium	Anatomy	83.7	
Croisade (Crusade)	History	15.0	
Crops, course of	Agriculture	50.0	Richard Watson Dickson
Croton	Botany	17.6	William Wood
Crystals	Chemistry	16.0	
Cucumis	Gardening	15.2	Richard Watson Dickson?
Curculio	Entomology	19.2	Edward Donovan
Curve	Geometry	16.2	James Ivory
Cutlery	Technology	15.4	Charles Sylvester
Cutting-engine	Mechanics	18.4	William Pearson
Cycle	Miscellaneous	21.8	

== Volume 11 ==
D – Dissimilitude Vol 11, 1808

Article	Classification	Columns	Contributor/Notes
Daemon	Antiquity	12.5	
Dairying	Rural economy	38.6	Richard Watson Dickson?
David	Biography	18.0	
Death	Physiology	18.6	
Declination of a Compass	Natural philosophy	14.5	
Declination	Astronomy	85.0	
Degeneration	Physiology	35.9	
Degree	Astronomy	118.2	
Deluge	Natural history	24.8	
Denmark	Geography	23.2	
Diagonal motion	Technology	21.7	John Duncan
Dial	Horology	30.4	William Pearson
Digestion	Physiology	28.2	
Diophantine	Algebra	18.8	John Pond
Dipping in Calico Printing	Dyeing	17.5	James Thomson

== Volume 12 ==
Dissimulation – Eloane Vol 12, 1809

Article	Classification	Columns	Contributor/Notes
Dog	Zoology	26.3	
Dramatic machinery	Theatre	15.0	
Dropsy	Medicine	17.6	
Druids	Miscellaneous	18.6	
Drunkenness	Physiology	15.2	
Dublin	Geography	16.0	
Duck	Ornithology	21.0	Edward Donovan
Dyeing	Dyeing (history of)	15.9	Charles Taylor
Dynamics	Physics	19.4	Tiberius Cavallo
Ear	Anatomy	43.8	
Earth	Astronomy	71.0	
Earthquake	Natural history	28.4	
Eclipse	Astronomy	57.9	
Egypt	Geography	33.0	
Electrical experiments	Electricity	35.9	
Electrical machine	Electricity	16.2	

== Volume 13 ==
Elocution – Extremities Vol 13, 1809

Article	Classification	Columns	Contributor/Notes
Embankment	Agriculture	26.0	Richard Watson Dickson
Embryo	Anatomy	23.0	
Enamelling	Arts - Technological	15.8	Edmund Turrell
England	Geography	38.8	
Engraving	Arts - Technological	48.0	
Entomology	Entomology	116.0	Signed D, for Donovan
Equations	Algebra	51.0	
Equatorial instrument	Astronomy	68.0	William Pearson
Escapement	Horology	47.7	William Pearson
Exchange	Commerce	29.5	Patrick Kelly
Extremities	Anatomy	79.0	

== Volume 14 ==
Extrinsic – Food Vol 14, 1810

Article	Classification	Columns	Contributor/Notes
Eye	Anatomy	67.6	
Falco	Ornithology	15.0	Edward Donovan
Falling stones	Natural history	16.0	
Fallowing of land	Agriculture	16.9	Richard Watson Dickson
Farm	Agriculture	40.0	Richard Watson Dickson
Felis	Zoology	27.8	
Fence	Agriculture	54.0	Richard Watson Dickson
Fever	Medicine	120.8	
Ficus	Botany	17.7	James Edward Smith
Fish, anatomy of	Comparative anatomy	136.5	
Fishery	Miscellaneous	32.4	
Fistula	Surgery	31.6	
Fluxions & methods of fluxions	Analysis	26.9	

== Volume 15 ==
Food – Generation Vol 15, 1810

Article	Classification	Columns	Contributor/Notes
Force	Mechanics	39.7	John Pond
Foundry	Technology	16.3	
Fracture	Surgery	71.2	
Fragaria	Botany	15.5	James Edward Smith
France	History	42.6	
French school of engraving	Arts	224.7	John Landseer
Function	Analysis	51.5	
Fungus	Surgery	18.8	
Furnace	Technology	16.2	
Furs	Commerce	26.3	
Galvanism	Electricity	17.2	Charles Sylvester
Gangrene	Medicine	16.1	
Gate	Rural Economy	18.9	Richard Watson Dickson
Gems, engraving of	Arts	24.7	Charles Konig; John Flaxman?
Gems	Miscellaneous	18.6	Charles Konig

== Volume 16 ==
Generation – Gretna Green Vol 16, 1810–11

Article	Classification	Columns	Contributor/Notes
Generation (Reproduction)	Physiology	131.5	
Geometry	Geometry	26.0	
Georgian planet (Uranus)	Astronomy	33.3	
German School of Engraving	Arts	68.2	John Landseer
Germany	Geography	24.6	
Gland	Anatomy	32.5	
Glass	Chemistry	43.0	
Gonorrhoea	Surgery	22.9	
Gout	Medicine	24.0	
Graduation of instruments	Astronomy	34.2	
Graecia	Ancient geography	18.4	
Grammar	Grammar	59.0	
Grass	Agriculture	20.0	Richard Watson Dickson
Grassland	Rural Economy	19.4	Richard Watson Dickson?
Gravitation	Natural Philosophy	29.0	
Grazing	Agriculture	25.4	Richard Watson Dickson
Greek language	Language	22.0	

== Volume 17 ==
Gretry – Hibe Vol 17, 1811

Article	Classification	Columns	Contributor/Notes
Gryllus	Entomology	25.1	
Gun-shot wounds	Surgery	24.3	
Gunnery	Warfare	19.4	James Glenie
Gunpowder	Manufactures	18.2	
Gutta Serena	Surgery	24.0	
Haemorrhage	Surgery	26.0	
Heart	Anatomy	87.0	
Heat	Natural philosophy	22.4	
Helix	Conchology	24.8	Edward Donovan
Hernia	Surgery	81.6	
Heron	Ornithology	15.0	Edward Donovan

== Volume 18 ==
Hibiscus – Increment Vol 18, 1811

Article	Classification	Columns	Contributor/Notes
Hindoostan	Geography	23.0	
History	History	16.3	
Hop	Agriculture	17.3	
Horse	Menage	31.0	
Hospital	Miscellaneous	27.6	
Hunting	Sports & Games	25.6	Delabere Pritchett Blaine
Husbandry	Rural economy	38.1	Richard Watson Dickson?
Hydrocele	Surgery	22.8	
Hydrocephalus	Medicine	17.4	
Hygrometry	Natural philosophy	16.0	
Hydrophobia	Medicine	17.4	
Hyperbolic logarithms	Mathematics	45.0	
Jews	History	17.8	
Imagination, Influence of, on the corporeal Frame	Medicine	20.9	Thomas Bateman

== Volume 19 ==
Increments – Kilmes Vol 19, 1811

Article	Classification	Columns	Contributor/Notes
Increments, Method of	Analysis	20.5	
Incubation	Comparative anatomy	43.0	
Infants, diseases of	Medicine	26.0	
Inoculation	Surgery	23.4	
Insects	Entomology	67.1	Edward Donovan
Insurance on lives	Insurance	15.1	
Integuments	Anatomy	39.5	
Intellectual education	Education	47.2	
Interest	Commerce	21.3	
Jones, Sir W.	Biography	15.3	
Ireland	Geography	31.0	
Iron	Technology	38.8	David Mushet
Isoperimetry	Mathematics	18.4	
Italian school of engraving	Arts	127	John Landseer
Kidney	Anatomy	25.5	

== Volume 20 ==
Kiln – Light Vol 20, 1812

Article	Classification	Columns	Contributor/Notes
Labour	Mid-wifery	16.5	Robert Bland
Lacedaeminians	Antiquity	22.8	
Language	Miscellaneous	39.2	
Larynx	Anatomy	24.2	
Latitude	Astronomy	22.7	
Lava	Mineralogy	16.3	
Laying-down to Grass	Agriculture	16.6	Richard Watson Dickson
Leaf	Botany	15.9	James Edward Smith
Leprosy	Medicine	22.7	
Lichenes	Botany	16.5	James Edward Smith
Life-annuities	Insurance	38.9	William Morgan
Life	Physiology	32.0	
Light, exhibition of by living animals	Zoology	22.6	
Light	Natural philosophy	40.8	

== Volume 21 ==
Light-house – Machinery Vol 21, 1812

Article	Classification	Columns	Contributor/Notes
Lime	Mineralogy	47.2	
Linen	Manufactures	24.1	
Lithotomy	Medicine	33.7	
Liver	Anatomy	26.0	
Lizard	Natural History	20.1	
Logarithms	Mathematics	53.0	
London	Geography	62.9	
Longitude	Geography	111.7	
Low countries, engraving of	Art	191.8	John Landseer
Lues Veneria	Medicine	54.7	
Lungs	Anatomy	48.1	
Luxation	Medicine	44.6	
Machine	Mechanics	15.7	
Machinery	Mechanics	43.3	

== Volume 22 ==
Machinery – Mattheson Vol 22, 1812

Article	Classification	Columns	Contributor/Notes
Machinery for manufacturing ships' blocks	Manufactures	36.1	John Farey, Jr.
Magnet	Natural philosophy	28.1	
Mammalia, anatomy of	Comparative anatomy	171.9	
Man	Natural History	111.7	
Manufacture of cotton	Manufactures	54.7	James Thomson and John Farey, Jr.; revisiting 1808's "Cotton manufacture"
Manure	Agriculture	47.2	Richard Watson Dickson
Marble	Mineralogy	30.5	
Mars	Astronomy	55.0	
Materia Medica	Materia Medica	46.6	
Mathematics	Mathematics	20.1	

== Volume 23 ==
Matthew – Monsoon Vol 23, 1812/3

Article	Classification	Columns	Contributor/Notes
Medals	Commerce	43.6	
Medicine	Medicine	43.6	
Membrane	Anatomy	35.5	
Mercury	Astronomy	26.0	
Mercury	Chemistry	21.0	
Meridional parts	Navigation	16.4	Andrew Mackay
Metastasio	Biography	17.8	Charles Burney
Mexico	Geography	31.7	
Microscope	Miscellaneous	29.9	
Mill-work	Technology	16.8	John Farey, Jr.
Mill	Technology	15.0	John Farey, Jr.
Milton, J.	Biography	15.0	
Mineralogy	Mineralogy	16.8	
Mining, history of	Technology	24.8	John Taylor
Money	Commerce	35.5	

== Volume 24 ==
Monster – Newton-in-the-Willows Vol 24, 1813

Article	Classification	Columns	Contributor/Notes
Monster	Anatomy	28.9	
Moon	Astronomy	40.4	
Moory Earth	Agriculture	18.8	Richard Watson Dickson
Moral Education	Education	65.9	
Morocco	Geography	21.5	
Mortality, bill of	Law	16.0	
Mossy Land	Agriculture	16.1	Richard Watson Dickson
Motacilla	Ornithology	18.7	
Motion	Physics	15.7	
Mountain	Geography	22.6	
Musca	Entomology	28.6	
Muscle	Anatomy	80.6	
Nervous system	Anatomy	106.2	

== Volume 25 ==
Newtonian Philosophy – Ozunusze Vol 25, 1813

Article	Classification	Columns	Contributor/Notes
Norfolk	Geography	20.0	
Norwich	Geography	19.1	
Notation	Arithmetic	19.1	
Number	Arithmetic	18.0	
Numbers, planetary	Astronomy	40.3	William Pearson
Oak-tree	Agriculture	16.1	Richard Watson Dickson
Observatory	Astronomy	22.6	William Pearson
Ogham characters	Cryptology	16.2	William Blair
Ophthalmy	Medicine	20.6	
Organ	Music	22.1	
Orkney Islands	Geography	15.5	
Orrery	Astronomy	63.3	William Pearson
Ossian	Poetry	16.8	
Otaheite	Geography	15.8	
Oxford	Geography	42.8	

== Volume 26 ==
P – Perturbation Vol 26, 1813/4

Article	Classification	Columns	Contributor/Notes
Painting, the art of	Art	69.2	
Paper	Manufactures	47.0	
Papilio	Entomology	53.8	Edward Donovan
Paring & Burning	Agriculture	22.7	Richard Watson Dickson
Paris	Geography	15.3	
Passiflora	Botany	16.5	James Edward Smith
Passion	Philosophy	17.3	
Pelargonium	Botany	15.5	James Edward Smith
Pendulum	Dynamics	25.2	
Persia	Geography	20.7	
Perspective	Art	56.3	Peter Nicholson

== Volume 27 ==
Pertussis – Poetics Vol 27, 1814

Article	Classification	Columns	Contributor/Notes
Peru	Geography	22.8	
Petrifications	Natural history	16.5	
Phalaena	Entomology	26.8	
Philosophy	Philosophy	215.7	
Phosphorus	Chemistry	25.9	
Physical education	Education	44.5	
Picture	Arts	15.8	
Plague	Medicine	24.0	
Planetarium	Astronomy	28.3	William Pearson
Planetary machines, an historical account of	Astronomy	30.2	William Pearson
Planet	Astronomy	19.5	
Plantation	Rural economy	15.5	Richard Watson Dickson?
Plants	Botany	71.2	James Edward Smith
Platonism	Philosophy	17.8	
Plough	Agriculture	20.5	Richard Watson Dickson

== Volume 28 ==
Poetry – Punjoor Vol 28, 1814

Article	Classification	Columns	Contributor/Notes
Poetry	Poetry	16.9	
Political economy	Political economy	35.5	
Pond	Agriculture	16.3	Richard Watson Dickson
Poor	Miscellaneous	18.6	
Pope	Religion	15.8	
Population	Political economy	18.5	
Porcelain	Miscellaneous	29.0	Charles Sylvester
Potato	Agriculture	40.7	Richard Watson Dickson
Prime number	Arithmetic	51.0	
Printing	Printing	35.5	
Projection	Mathematics	42.2	Peter Nicholson
Prunus	Gardening	24.9	Richard Watson Dickson?

== Volume 29 ==
Punishment – Repton Vol 29, 1814/5

Article	Classification	Columns	Contributor/Notes
Punishment	Law	17.5	
Putrefaction	Chemistry	16.0	
Pyrus	Gardening	34.8	Richard Watson Dickson
Pytrotechny	Manufactures	16.8	
Quadrant	Astronomy	25.0	
Quantity	Grammar	48.2	
Quarry	Agriculture	22.4	Richard Watson Dickson?
Quinces	Botany	27.0	James Edward Smith
Ranunculus	Botany	23.9	James Edward Smith
Ratio	Arithmetic	19.5	
Refraction	Optics	37.4	
Religion	Religion	16.4	
Reptiles	Comparative anatomy	154.5	

== Volume 30 ==
Republic – Rzemien Vol 30, 1815

Article	Classification	Columns	Contributor/Notes
Resistance of fluids	Mechanics	16.0	
Respiration	Physiology	43.6	
Revenue	Government	18.4	
Revolution	Politics	21.9	
Rigging	Naval matters	28.7	George Glover; possibly pseudonymous
Road	Rural Economy	31.6	Richard Watson Dickson?
Rock	Geology	17.6	
Rome, Roman Empire, etc	History	43.3	
Roof	Architecture	24.1	
Root	Arithmetic	27.9	
Rope-making	Manufactures	35.4	George Glover; possibly pseudonymous
Rosa	Botany	21.9	James Edward Smith
Rotation	Mechanics	18.1	
Rubus	Botany	17.5	James Edward Smith
Russia	Geography	56.7	

== Volume 31 ==
S – Scotium Vol 31, 1815

Article	Classification	Columns	Contributor/Notes
Sail and sail-making	Naval affairs	51.3	George Glover; possibly pseudonymous
Sailing	Naval affairs	27.2	George Glover; possibly pseudonymous
Salix	Botany	43.1	James Edward Smith
Salt	Manufactures	27.7	
Salt-Brine Springs	Rural economy	15.5	Richard Watson Dickson?
Salt, as manure	Agriculture	18.7	Richard Watson Dickson
Salts	Chemistry	30.3	
Satellites	Astronomy	157.2	William Pearson
Saturn	Astronomy	46.1	
Saxifraga	Botany	16.2	James Edward Smith
Saxons	History	16.4	
Scarabaeus	Entomology	20.8	Edward Donovan
Schools	Education	22.0	

== Volume 32 ==
Scotland – Sindy Vol 32, 1815/6

Article	Classification	Columns	Contributor/Notes
Scotland	Geology	60.8	
Sculpture	Arts	74.8	
Scurvy	Medicine	16.8	
Series	Analysis	32.5	
Shakespeare, Wm	Biography	20.5	
Sheep	Agriculture	119.2	Robert Bakewell
Ship-building	Naval affairs	161.3	George Glover; possibly pseudonymous
Silene	Botany	16.1	James Edward Smith
Silver	Mining	18.5	

== Volume 33 ==
Sines – Starboard Vol 33, 1816

Article	Classification	Columns	Contributor/Notes
Sines	Mathematics	81.0	
Slave trade	Miscellaneous	36.1	
Small-pox	Medicine	26.0	
Soil	Agriculture	41.2	Richard Watson Dickson
Spain	Geography	26.1	
Speculum	Astronomy	14.9	William Pearson
Spine	Anatomy	21.9	
Springs	Natural History	48.0	
Standard	Commerce	15.6	Patrick Kelly
Star	Astronomy	65.4	

== Volume 34 ==
Starch – Szydlow Vol 34, 1816

Article	Classification	Columns	Contributor/Notes
Steam engine	Technology	175.2	John Farey, Jr.
Stone	Natural history	28.6	
Stove	Building	16.2	
Strata	Geology	36.8	
Strength of materials	Mechanics	36.9	Peter Barlow
Sugar-cane	Miscellaneous	32.0	
Surface-Drain	Agriculture	25.4	Richard Watson Dickson?
Surgery	Surgery	28.5	
Survivorship	Annuities	23.6	
Swine	Agriculture	19.6	Richard Watson Dickson
System	Mineralogy	22.0	

== Volume 35 ==
T – Toleration Vol 35, 1817

Article	Classification	Columns	Contributor/Notes
Tax	Government	15.0	
Teeth, diseases of	Physiology	20.0	
Telegraph	Miscellaneous	22.2	
Telescope	Astronomy	161.8	William Pearson
Theodolite	Surveying	16.1	William Pearson. Plate X for "Surveying - Theodolite" is an 1811 survey of Pearson's estate in Mortlake, London Borough of Richmond upon Thames, which became Temple Grove School.
Thermometer	Natural philosophy	42.8	
Tides	Natural philosophy	24.1	
Timber	Rural economy	34.8	Richard Watson Dickson
Tithes, as Obstructions to Agriculture	Agriculture	17.0	Richard Watson Dickson?

== Volume 36 ==
Tolerium – Vermelho Vol 36, 1817

Article	Classification	Columns	Contributor/Notes
Trifolium	Botany	28.5	James Edward Smith
Trigonometry	Triginometry	27.4	
Tumours	Surgery	18.6	
Turning	Manufactures	19.6	
Turnip	Agriculture	26.9	Richard Watson Dickson
Variation of magnetic needle	Naval affairs	25.0	
Veins, metallic and mineral	Geology	16.1	
Venus	Astronomer	23.7	

== Volume 37 ==
Vermes – Waterloo Vol 37, 1817/8

Article	Classification	Columns	Contributor/Notes
Vermes	Anatomy	87.5	
Veronica	Botany	25.0	James Edward Smith
Versification	Poetry	53.5	Henry Parker
Viola	Botany	24.0	James Edward Smith
Vitis	Gardening	24.4	Richard Watson Dickson?
Ulcer	Surgery	30.5	
Union	Government	32.3	
United States	Geography	23.5	
Volcano	Geology	51.0	
Urethra, strictures	Medicine	20.0	
Urinary calculi	Surgery	15.0	
Urine, incontinence	Surgery	32.0	
Urtica	Botany	18.4	James Edward Smith
Watches	Horology	33.8	William Pearson
Water	Geography	20.7	

== Volume 38 ==
Water – Wzetin Vol 38, 1818

Article	Classification	Columns	Contributor/Notes
Waters, Natural	Chemistry	17.2	
Water, Raising of	Manufactures	201.5	John Farey, Jr.
Watering of land	Agriculture	22.4	Richard Watson Dickson
Watson, Richard	Biography	18.3	
Weaving	Manufactures	28.0	John Duncan
Weed	Agriculture	27.9	Richard Watson Dickson
Weight	Physics	21.3	
Westminster	Geography	21.7	
Wheat	Agriculture	25.6	Richard Watson Dickson
Wheel	Manufactures	29.2	
White-swelling	Surgery	15.4	
Wind-mill	Manufactures	14.6	John Farey, Jr.
Wind	Meteorology	20.3	
Wine	Manufactures	28.9	
Wollen manufacture	Manufactures	75.8	Robert Bakewell
Wool	Manufactures	30.7	Robert Bakewell
Worsted manufacture	Manufactures	20.1	Robert Bakewell
Wounds	Surgery	98.7	

== Volume 39 ==
X – Zytomiers with Addenda and Corrigenda Vol 39, 1818–20

Article	Classification	Columns	Contributor/Notes
Zenith	Astronomy	21.1	
Anemone	Botany	17.0	James Edward Smith
Crystallography	Crystallography	23.0	
Mineralogy	Mineralogy	74.4	
Printing, Calico	Manufactures	18.7	James Thomson
Quarantine	Medicine	20.0	

== See also ==
- List of long biographical articles on Rees's Cyclopaedia
