= James Burton & Sons =

Lancashire cotton company, 1784 to 1926

James Burton & Sons Ltd
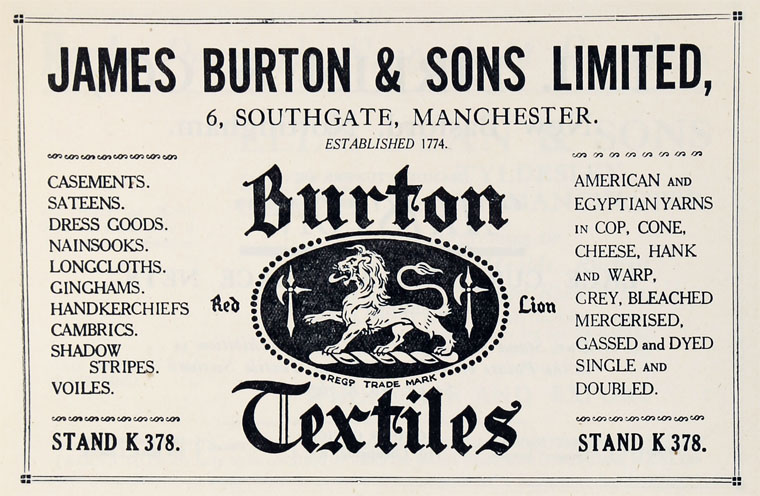
- Industry: Cotton Manufacturing
- Predecessor: Burton, Chippendale & Co.
- Founded: 1784; 242 years ago
- Founder: James Burton
- Defunct: 1926
- Headquarters: Tyldesley, Lancashire
- Products: Casements, sateens, dress goods etc.

James Burton & Sons was a cotton spinning and manufacturing company established in the middle of the 19th century by James Burton in Tyldesley, Manchester, England following the dissolution of the partnership of Burton, Chippendale & Co. in the late 1840s. The business, active until 1926, caught the wave of the cotton-boom following the American Civil War, experiencing rapid growth within the United Kingdom and abroad.

In 1868, with the death of James Burton, the business was managed by his sons, John Burton (1809–1879), Oliver Burton (1822–1883) and Frederick Burton (1828–1913).

The company was incorporated on 9 April 1920 and listed on the stock exchange in 1922 before its end in 1926.

== The founder ==
James Burton was born on 22 September 1784 to Oliver Burton and Ann Wilcock in Ingleton, North Yorkshire. He married Alice Hartley (1788–1840) on 23 July 1807 and became managing partner at the ‘then celebrated’ Thompson, Chippendale & Co., Calico printers, Primrose Hill, Clitheroe.

Burton in 1830.

Originally "Primrose Printworks", the works was acquired by the joint efforts of James Thomson, John Chippendale and James Burton in 1810-11 and assumed the style of "Thomson, Chippendale, Burton and Thomson".

James Thomson, John Chippendale and James Burton met at Church Bank, near Accrington, with Thomson being a student of chemistry there under the direction of Messrs. Peel, in connection with their extensive printing establishment at that place. Chippendale's father was a cotton piece maker in the neighbouring town of Blackburn. Burton also gained much experience from Messrs. Peel and Yates. He had a large cellar arranged and fitted up with lathes and other convieniences for his favourite pursuit of mechanisation. The three met regularly in James Burton's cellar, experimenting with various methods and techniques which eventuated in the partnership at Primrose Hill, works "which ultimately became the most celebrated in the world in their special line."

In 1827, Burton was paid out of the firm by Thomson, receiving £10,000, and moved to Tyldesley, though the two remained good friends until Thomson's death in 1850. Indeed, no addition, alteration or improvement connected with the machinery at Primrose without consultation with Burton, so great was Thomson's esteem of him. James Thomson proceeded to work with his brother William.

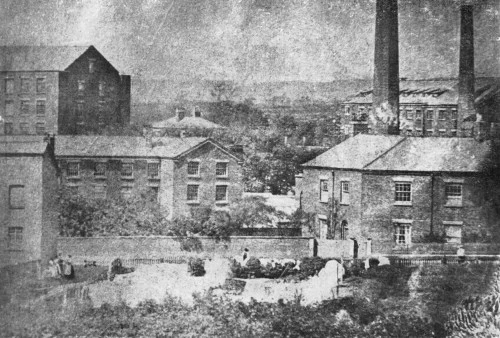
Burton House (and mills). Demolished in 1926.

In late 1827, Burton left Clitheroe to reside in Tyldesley as partner of John Jones and Richard J. Jones, the firm being Jones, Burton & Jones. They worked the Tyldesley Mill before also purchasing Lower Mill. At the expiration of their period of partnership (when R. Jones left to join his brother at the Bedford New Mills, Leigh), Burton entered into partnership with John Chippendale, under the firm of Burton, Chippendale & Co. By 1838, Burton was living on Charles Street in a 10 bedroom house and had acquired 74 cottages and 57 cellars in which his workers lived and the closest pub.

When this partnership dissolved, paving the way for James Burton & Sons, three more mills had been erected: Lodge Mill (1853), Field Mill (1856), and Westfield (1860). These additions made the company the "most extensive establishment of its kind in the district."

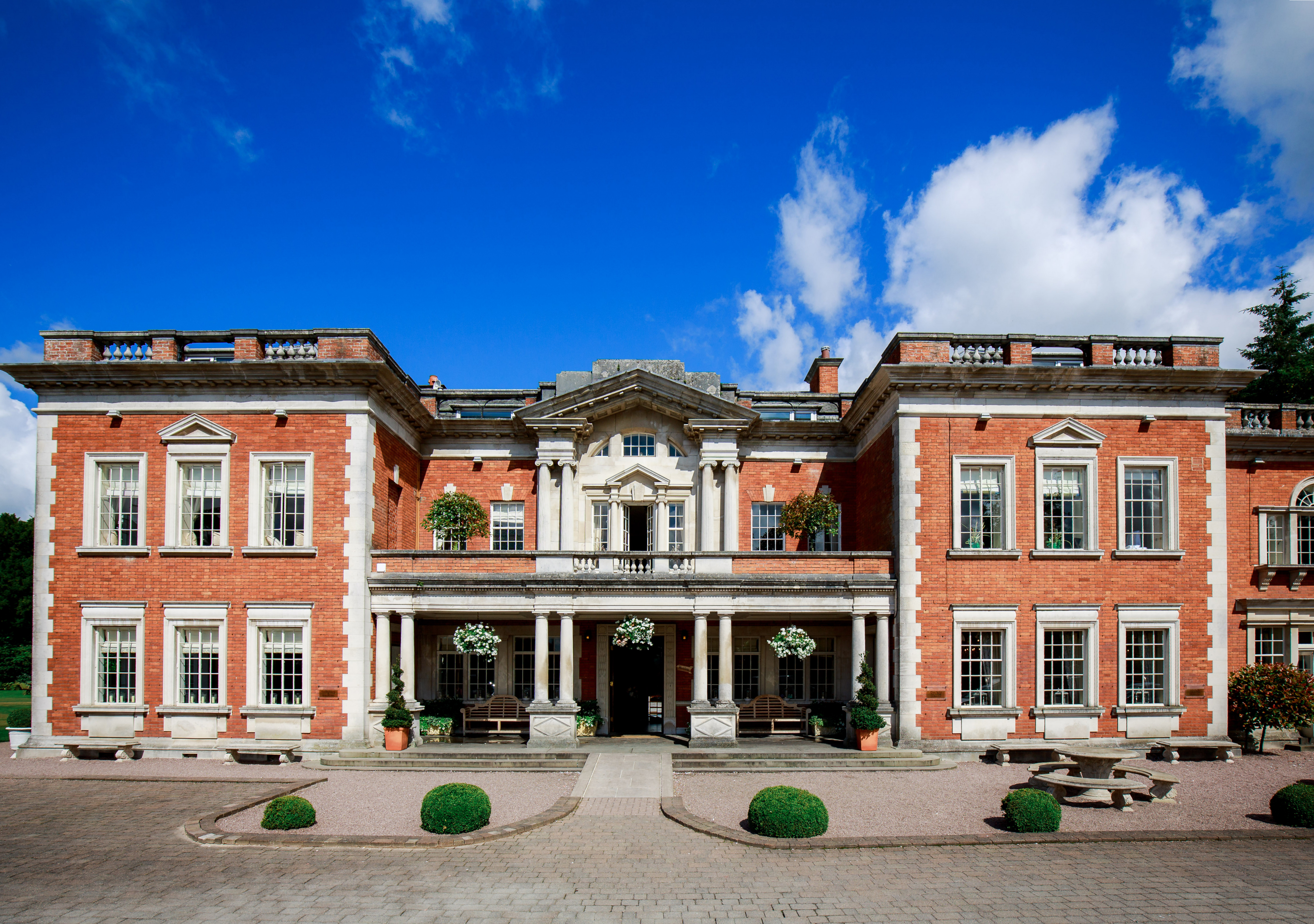
Eaves Hall. Built for John Burton (1809–1879) in 1864

John Burton, who commissioned Eaves Hall, West Bradford, Lancashire to be built for his use in 1864, inherited majority control of the company though, due to poor health, his brothers Oliver and Frederick ran the mills. James Burton Jr (1819–1865), the second son, died before his father.
