= Esther Bakewell =

English novelist (1798–1873)

- Born: January 6, 1798; Wakefield
- Died: July 21, 1873 (aged 75); Hampstead
- Occupation: Writer
- Parent(s): Robert Bakewell
- Relatives: Frederick Bakewell

Esther Bakewell (January 6, 1798 – July 21, 1873) was an English novelist and children's book writer.

Esther Bakewell was born on January 6, 1798 in Wakefield, the fifth child of Robert Bakewell and his first wife Apphia Simpson. Her father was a pioneering geologist and her younger brother Frederick Collier Bakewell was an inventor. Little is known of her life, other than she lived with Frederick's family and died on July 21, 1873 in Hampstead.

Bakewell wrote a single novel, Glenwood Manor-House (1857). Most of her writing was for children, including a book of stories called The Book of One Syllable (1842) and a boarding school story, Eagle Cliff (1843). She contributed the story "My First Place" to the Jan. 10, 1852 issue of Charles Dickens' Household Words, about a servant girl falsely accused of theft, a theme that reappeared in Glenwood Manor-House.

== Bibliography ==
- The Book of One Syllable. Harvey and Darton, 1842.
- Eagle Cliff, a Tale. Darton and Clark, 1843.
- Glenwood Manor-House: A Novel. 1 vol. London: Arthur Hall, 1857.
- The New Book of One Syllable. London, 1868
