= Flopsy =

Flopsy is a common name for pet rabbits.

Flopsy may also refer to:

- Flopsy Rabbit, a fictional rabbit character in The Tale of Peter Rabbit by Beatrix Potter and mother of the Flopsy Bunnies
- Flopsy Fish, a villain in the Mario series of computer games
- Flopsy, a character in This Toilet Earth, an album by GWAR
- Flopsie, a character in Avatar: The Last Airbender
