= King Coal (disambiguation) =

King Coal may refer to

- King Coal, a 1917 novel by Upton Sinclair
- King Coal (film), a 2023 documentary film about coal mining in Appalachia
- King Coal (train), a 1930s passenger train service in Pennsylvania
- King Coal's Levee, an 1818 poem by English poet John Scafe
- King Coal, a 1981 book on the British coal industry by Tony Hall, Baron Hall of Birkenhead
- King Coal, the nickname for English coal entrepreneur Richard Budge (1947 - 2016)
