= James Carter (engraver) =

British engraver (1798–1855)

James Carter (London 23 December 1798 – 23 August 1855) was a British engraver.

== Life ==
Carter was born in the London parish of Shoreditch, and while still young gained the silver medal of the Society of Arts for drawing. He was first articled to Edmund Turrell, an architectural engraver, but later concentrated on landscapes and figures.

James Carter married Sarah Emily Wise on 22 December 1823 and died on 23 August 1855, leaving his wife Sarah and nine daughters.

== Works ==
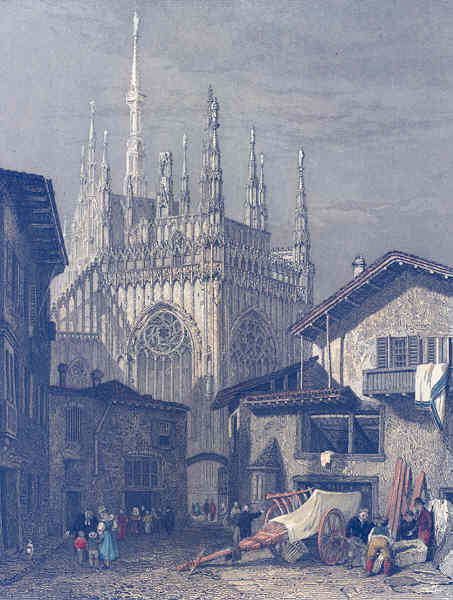
The Duomo di Milano, 1832 engraving by James Carter after Clarkson Stanfield

From 1830 to 1840, Carter was employed largely on engravings for the annuals, especially the Landscape Annual of Robert Jennings, for which he executed plates after Samuel Prout, David Roberts, and James Holland. He was also employed by John Weale, on numerous architectural works.

When the engravings from the Vernon Gallery appeared in The Art Journal, Carter was given The Village Festival, painted by Frederick Goodall. It was followed in the same series by engravings from The Angler's Nook, painted by Patrick Nasmyth, and Hadrian's Villa, painted by Richard Wilson; Edward Matthew Ward then asked that Carter should engrave his picture The South Sea Bubble, and subsequently employed him to engrave Benjamin West's First Essay in Art, a large plate he completed a short time before his death. This was Carter's largest and most important work.

Other works by Carter were a plate from his own design of Cromwell dictating to Milton the Despatch on behalf of the Waldenses, and a portrait of Sir Marc Isambard Brunel, after Samuel Drummond.
