= William Holt Yates =

English physician

William Holt Yates (1802–26 January 1874) was a medical doctor. He travelled to the Middle East and was elected a resident member of the Royal Asiatic Society on 21 June 1834.

== Education ==
He attended the University of Edinburgh and St John's College, Cambridge, (M.D. 1826).

== Career ==
He was a member of the Royal College of Physicians of London. He was Physician for the Royal General Dispensary, London, then Consulting Physician, retiring in 1846.

In 1841 he travelled around Egypt. He gave an account of this journey in The Modern History and Condition of Egypt, its Climate, Diseases, and Capabilities, 2 volumes, 1843.

He was an Honorary Secretary of the Syro-Egyptian Society, which was founded on 3 December 1844 in London.

== Family ==
His parents were William Yates, of Wickersley Hall, Yorkshire and Elizabeth Titcomb. On 2 August 1837 he married Amelia Mary Maxwell, daughter of William Maxwell and Sarah Low at St George's, Hanover Square Astronomer William Pearson, who officiated at the wedding, was married to Sarah Low's sister, Frances Low.

William Holt Yates was a cousin of Jonathan Holt Titcomb who was the first Bishop of Rangoon and father of artist William Holt Yates Titcomb.
