= William Pearson (astronomer) =

English schoolmaster and astronomer

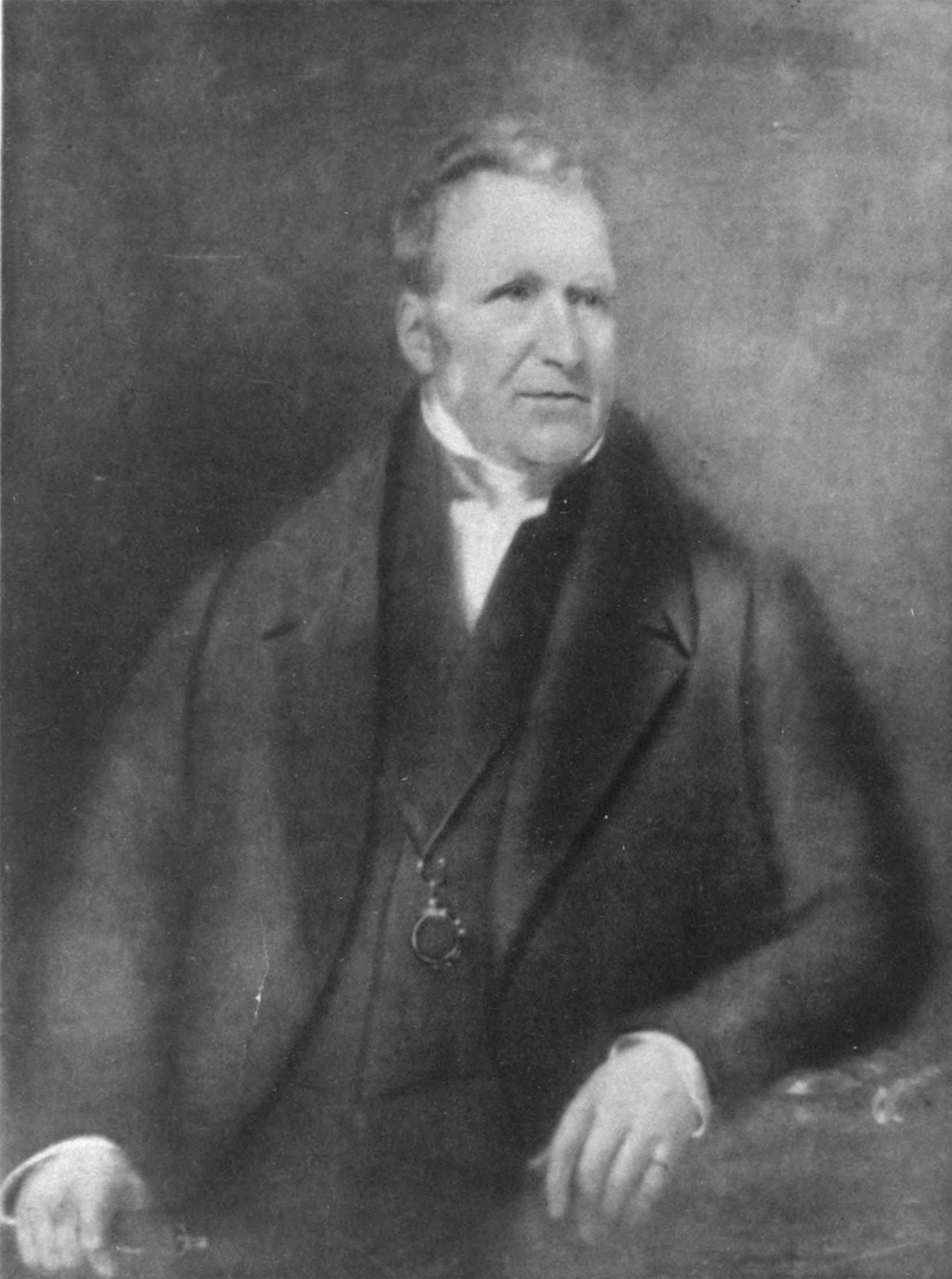
Portrait of William Pearson (1767-1847) from History of the Royal Astronomical Society, 1820–1920.

William Pearson FRS (23 April 1767–6 September 1847) was an English schoolmaster, astronomer, and a founder of the Astronomical Society of London. He authored Practical Astronomy (2 vols., 1825 and 1829).

== Biography ==
William Pearson was born at Whitbeck in Cumberland on 23 April 1767. After graduating from Hawkshead Grammar School near to Lake Windermere, Westmorland, Pearson began his career as a schoolmaster at Hawkshead. After which, moving to Lincoln as undermaster of the Free Grammar School. Through Pearson's interest in astronomy, Pearson constructed an astronomical clock and an orrery, which was probably used for public lectures. Although enrolled at Cambridge University, he does not appear to have earned a degree. He was admitted as a sizar at Clare College in 1793, but may not have gained residence.

An original proprietor of the Royal Institution, Pearson finished a planetarium in 1803 that illustrated Dr. Thomas Young's lectures. On 10 January 1810 Pearson was presented to the rectory of Perivale in Middlesex. On 15 March 1817, Lord-chancellor Eldon presented Pearson to the rectory of South Kilworth in Leicestershire.

He acquired the Temple Grove School, a large private institution at East Sheen in 1810. After establishing an observatory there, he measured the diameters of the Sun and Moon during the partial solar eclipse of 7 September 1820, with one of John Dollond's divided object-glass micrometers.

The foundation of the Astronomical Society of London (now known as the Royal Astronomical Society) was largely due to his efforts. In 1812 and 1816, he began development of the society that formally took shape during a meeting at the Freemasons' Tavern on 12 January 1820. Pearson helped write the rules and served as treasurer during the society's first ten years. In 1819, he was elected a Fellow of the Royal Society and received an honorary LL.D.

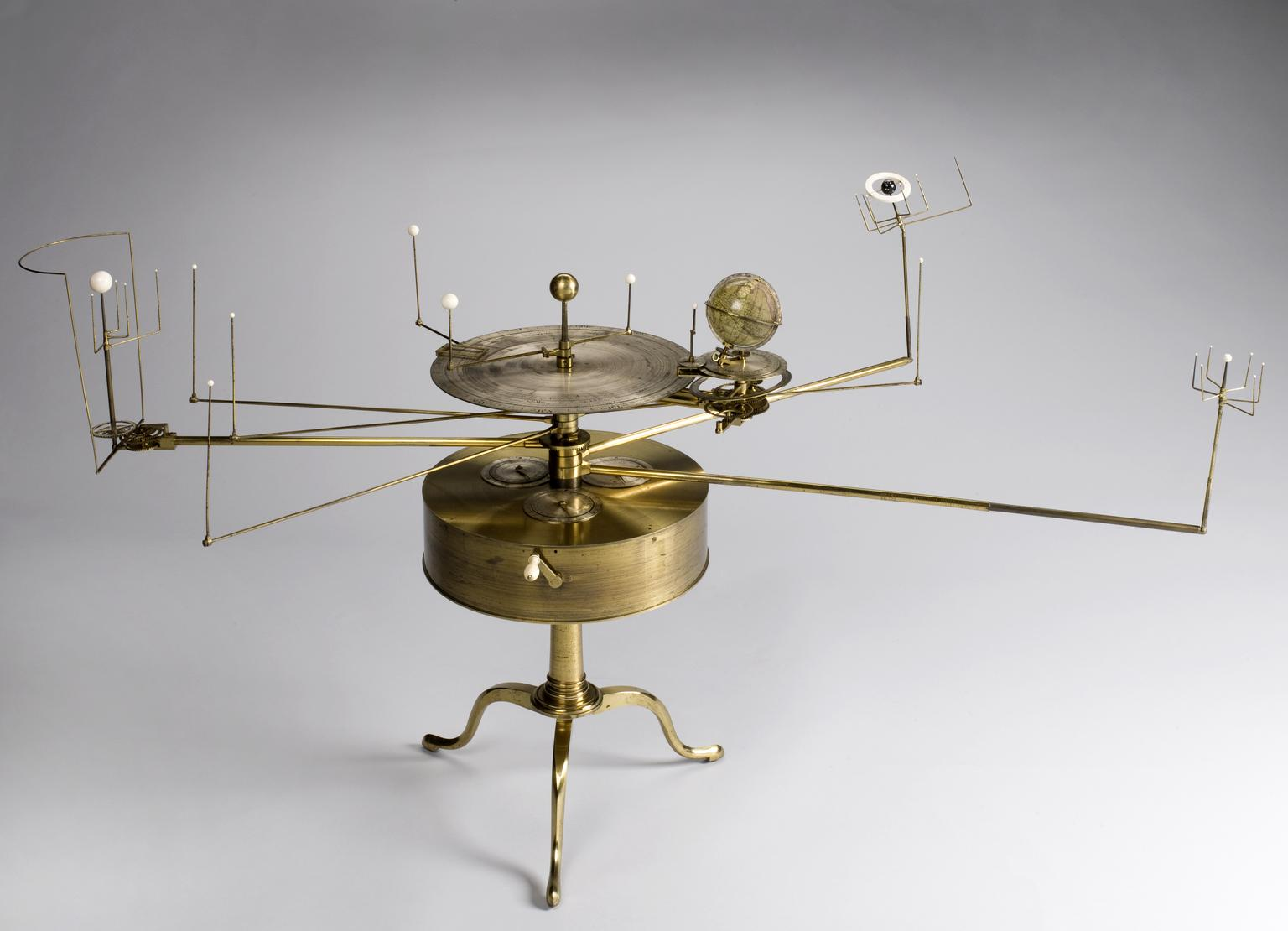
Orrery designed by William Pearson (1767-1847), 1813-1822 now in the Science Museum, London. Made by Robert Fidler.

After leaving East Sheen in 1821, William erected an observatory at South Kilworth that possessed a 36-inch focal-length altazimuth telescope, originally constructed by Edward Troughton for the St. Petersburg Academy of Sciences. The observatory was also equipped with a 42-inch focal-length achromatic refractor by Tulley, a transit circle by William Simms, and a clock by Hardy.

While at South Kilworth, Pearson observed the occultations of the Pleiades in July and October 1821. In 1824 and 1829, he published the two quarto volumes of his Introduction to Practical Astronomy. The first volume mainly contained tables for the processes of reduction. The second volume included elaborate descriptions and engravings of various astronomical instruments (drawn by John Farey, Jr, and engraved by Edmund Turrell) along with instructions for their use. Pearson received the Gold Medal of the Royal Astronomical Society (then known as the Astronomical Society of London) on 13 February 1829 for the publication, which Sir John Herschel called ‘one of the most important and extensive works on that subject which has ever issued from the press’.

In 1830, the Royal Observatory nominated Pearson to its new board of visitors. Assisted by a village mathematician named Ambrose Clarke, Pearson began the reobservation and computation of the 520 stars tabulated for occultations in his Practical Astronomy during the same year. He presented the resulting catalogue to the Royal Astronomical Society on 11 June 1841.

Pearson observed Halley's Comet on 29 October 1835, and in 1839 he deduced a value for the obliquity of the ecliptic from his own research.

He died on 6 September 1847 at South Kilworth, and a tablet honoring his memory in the church recognizes the respect earned by his exemplary conduct as a clergyman and magistrate.

== Family ==
William Pearson married Frances Low on 22 February 1796 at St Swithun, East Retford, Nottinghamshire. Their daughter, Frances, was born in 1797 in Lincoln. Frances Pearson, née Low, died on 10 October 1831, aged 61 years and was buried at South Kilworth.

Frances Low's sister, Sarah Low, married William Maxwell in 1804. William Pearson officiated when their daughter, Amelia Mary Maxwell, married William Holt Yates in 1837 at St George's, Hanover Square.

He married Eliza Sarah Hunter on 10 November 1832 at St George, Hanover Square, Middlesex. Eliza Sarah Pearson, née Hunter, died in Tunbridge Wells, Kent in 1878, aged 82.

== Works ==
- His textbook, Selected Speeches for the Young Gentlemen of the Seminary (1801), taught Rhetoric.
- Introduction to Practical Astronomy, Vol 1, 1824, and Vol 2, 1829, contained 31 plates drawn by John Farey, Jr, and engraved by Edmund Turrell.
- Pearson contributed 63 articles to Rees's Cyclopædia on practical astronomy, which included Astronomical, Chronometrical, Optical etc. Instruments, Horology, Planetary Machines, and Watch. The full list is in Gurman and Harratt, p290.
- He wrote the article on Planetary Machines in the Edinburgh Encyclopædia
- He authored numerous articles in Nicholson's Journal, the Philosophical Magazine, and periodicals published by the Royal Astronomical Society. The full list is in Gurman and Harratt, p289.

== Green Plaque ==
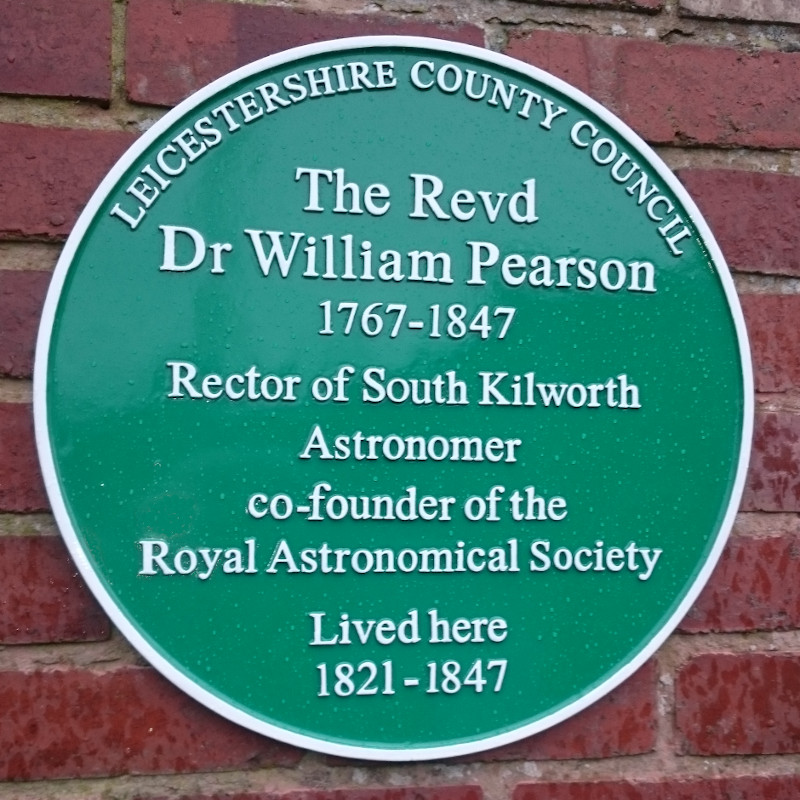
A plaque at the Rectory, South Kilworth, commemorating the astronomer William Pearson.

On 16 January, 2020, a green plaque was unveiled at the Rectory, South Kilworth, Leicestershire. William Pearson lived there from 1821 until his death in 1847.

It was 200 years and four days after the dinner on 12 January, 1820 at the Freemason's Tavern, Lincoln's Inn Fields, London, which led to the formation of the Astronomical Society of London. In 1831 this became the Royal Astronomical Society.

William Pearson's grave was restored in 2019 to coincide with this event, with funding from South Kilworth Parish Council and the Royal Astronomical Society.
