= List of long biographical articles in Rees's Cyclopaedia =

This is a list of the longer biographical articles from Rees's Cyclopaedia, 4 columns or more (3000 words appx.) The longest is that of Captain Cook (43.9 columns).

There are 3789 biographies half a column (350 words) or more long, and an unknown number of briefer ones. Sir James Edward Smith wrote the botanical articles, and Charles Burney the ones on music. Many of the biographical articles are sourced to biographical reference books. In most cases Christian names were Anglicised – John for Johannes, for example.

== Vol 1 A-Amarathides ==
Name	Century	Country	Occupation	Columns	Contributor/Notes
Addison, Joseph	17th	English	Writer	8.0	
Adrian	2nd	Roman	Emperor	7.5	
Agricola	1st	Rome	Ruler	4.0	
Alaric I	4th	Unknown	King	4.0	
Alcibiades	Ancient	Greece	General	4.4	
Alembert, John D'	18th	France	Mathematician	4.7	
Alexander the Great	Ancient	Macedonia	Emperor	23.4	
Alfred the Great	9th	English	King	6.2	
Alva, Don Fernando	16th	Spain	General	6.5	

== Vol 2 Amarantus–Arteriotomy ==
Name	Century	Country	Occupation	Columns	Contributor/Notes
Ambrose, Saint	4th	Spain	Bishop	5.4	
Anselm	11th	England	Archbishop	4.0	
Antoninus, Marcus	9th	Italian	Emperor	4.0	
Aristotle	Ancient	Greece	Philosopher	14.8	

== Vol 3 Artery–Battersea ==
Name	Century	Country	Occupation	Columns	Contributor/Notes
Athanasius, Saint	4th	Egypt	Bishop	3.9	
Atterbury, Francis	17th	England	Bishop	5.1	
Augustus, Octavian Caesar	Ancient/1st	Rome	Emperor	11.0	
Aurelian	3rd	Rome	Emperor	5.0	
Bacon, Francis	16th	England	Philosopher/Chancellor	8.4	

== Vol 4 Battery–Bookbinding ==
Name	Century	Country	Occupation	Columns	Contributor/Notes
Baxter, Richard	17th	England	Non-Conformist Divine	4.1	
Bayle, Peter	17th	France	Philosopher	6.1	
Beckett, Thomas	13th	English	Prelate	8.0	
Belisarius	6th	Rome	Emperor	5.1	
Berkeley, George	18th	Irish	Bishop	5.5	
Blackburne, Francis	18th	England	Clergyman	5.8	
Blake, Robert	17th	England	Admiral	4.3	
Boerhaave, Hermann.	17th	Holland	Chemist	4.1	

== Vol 5 Book-keeping–Calvart ==
Name	Century	Country	Occupation	Columns	Contributor/Notes
Boileau-Despraeux, Nicholas	17th	France	Poet	4.8	
Boscovich, Ruggero Guiseppi	18th	Italy	Mathematician	6.8	
Boyle, Robert	13th	England	Philosopher	9.7	
Bracciolini, Poggio	15th	Italy	Writer	5.2	
Brahe, Tycho	16th	Denmark	Astronomer	4.9	
Brindley, James	18th	England	Inventor	5.0	
Brissot, Jaques	18th	France	Revolutionary	4.3	
Brown, John	18th	England	Clergyman	4.1	
Buchanan, George	16th	Scotland	Poet	4.1	
Buffon, George Louis	18th	France	Naturalist	6.0	
Burke, Edmund,	18th	Ireland	Scholar	4.6	
Burnet, Gilbert	17th	England	Prelate	6.2	
Caesar, Caius Julius	Ancient	Rome	Dictator	10.6	

== Vol 6 Calvary–Castra ==
Name	Century	Country	Occupation	Columns	Contributor/Notes
Calvin, John	16th	France	Religious reformer	11.6	
Camden, John	16th	England	Historian	5.3	
Campbell, Colin	18th	Scottish	Clan leader	11.4	
Camper, Peter	18th	Holland	Physician	4.4	
Caracalla, Marcus A. A.	2nd	Rome	Emperor	4.8	
Cardan, Girolamo	16th	Italy	Philosopher	4.5	
Cartes, Des, Rene	17th	France	Philosopher	8.6	Rees's idiosyncratic spelling of Descartes.

== Vol 7 Castramentation–Chronology ==
Name	Century	Country	Occupation	Columns	Contributor/Notes
Catherine II	18th	Russia	Ruler	28.0	Tooke
Cato	Ancient	Italy	General	12.2	
Charlelemagne	8th	French	Emperor	9.0	
Charles I	17th	England	King	6.6	
Charles II	17th	England	King	9.0	
Charles V	16th	France	Holy Roman Emperor	11.0	
Charles XII	17th	Sweden	King	7.8	

== Vol 8 Chronometer–Colliseum ==
Name	Century	Country	Occupation	Columns	Contributor/Notes
Churchill, John	17th	England	Statesman	4.0	
Cicero	Ancient	Italy	Government Official	20.6	
Clarke, Samuel	17th	England	Scholar	6.0	
Clement VII	16th	Italy	Pope	8.0	
Cleopatra III	Ancient	Egypt	Queen	4.7	

== Vol 9 Collision–Corne ==
Name	Century	Country	Occupation	Columns	Contributor/Notes
Columbus, Christopher	15th	Italy	Explorer	5.8	
Constantine I	4th	Byzantium	Emperor	5.7	
Cook, James	18th	England	Discoverer	43.9	
Corelli, Arcangelo	17th	Italy	Musician	5.8	Burney

== Vol 10 Cornea–Czyrcassy ==
Name	Century	Country	Occupation	Columns	Contributor/Notes
Cortes, Ferdinand	16th	Spain	Naval Commander	11.3	
Cranmer, Thomas	16th	England	Archbishop/Martyr	4.0	
Cromwell, Oliver	17th	England	Statesman	7.9	
Cyrus	Ancient	Persia	King	4.9	

== Vol 11 D–Dissimilitude ==
Name	Century	Country	Occupation	Columns	Contributor/Notes
Daniel	Ancient	Jerusalem	Prophet	5.1	
David	Ancient	Palestine	King	18.0	
Demosthenes	Ancient	Greece	Orator	4.5	
Muris, John De	14th	France	Musician	6.5	Burney; Rees's idiosyncratic spelling of De Muris
Dioclesian	3rd	Rome	Emperor	9.8	

== Vol 12 Dissimulation–Eloane ==
Name	Century	Country	Occupation	Columns	Contributor/Notes
Doddridge, Philip	18th	England	Minister	7.0	
Dombey, Joseph	18th	France	Botanist	5.6	Smith
Domitian	lst	Rome	Emperor	5.2	
Dryden, John	17th	England	Poet	5.2	
Elizabeth I	17th	England	Queen	4.7	

== Vol 13 Elocution–Extremities ==
Name	Century	Country	Occupation	Columns	Contributor/Notes
Emlyn	17th	England	Non-Conformist divine	5.0	
Erasmus	15th	Holland	Divine	4.2	

== Vol 14 Extrinsic–Food (part) ==
Name	Century	Country	Occupation	Columns	Contributor/Notes
Farinelli, (Carlo Broschi).	18th	Italy	Opera singer	7.2	Burney
Fenelon, Francis	17th	France	Archbishop	10.0 ‘	

== Vol 15 Food (part)–Generation (part) ==
Name	Century	Country	Occupation	Columns	Contributor/Notes
Fox, Charles	18th	Fngland	Statesman	14.2	
Franco, Magister.	10th	France	Writer of Musical Tracts	4.5	Burney
Franklin, Benjamin	18th	America	InventorDiplomat	5.9	
Frederic III	18th	Prussia	King	7.3	
Galilei, Galileo	17th	Italy	Astronomer	11.3	
Gardiner, Stephen,	16th	England	Bishop	7.2	
Geddes, Alexander.	18th	Scotland	Translator	4.3	

== Vol 16 Generation (part)–Gretna ==
Name	Century	Country	Occupation	Columns	Contributor/Notes
George I	17th	England	King	4.6	
Gregory I	6th	Italy	Pope	5.8	

== Vol 17 Gretry–Hebe ==
Name	Century	Country	Occupation	Columns	Contributor/Notes
Gretry, Andre	18th	Belgium	Opera Composer	7.2	Burney
Guido, Aretino	16th	Italy	Musician	4.8	Burney
Haller, Albert	18th	Switzerland	Physician	5.4	
Handel, George	18th	German	Composer	11.7	Burney
Hasselquist, Frederick	18th	Sweden	Botanist	4.0	Smith

== Vol 18 Hibiscus–Increment ==
Name	Century	Country	Occupation	Columns	Contributor/Notes
Hippocrates	Ancient	Greece	Physician	6.6	
Hogarth, William	18th	England	Engraver	14.5	
Hunter, William	18th	Scotland	Physician	4.5	
Hunter, John	18th	Scotland	Anatomist	5.2	

== Vol 19 Increments–Kilmes ==
Name	Century	Country	Occupation	Columns	Contributor/Notes
Jerome of Prague	15th	Bohemia	Martyr	4.9	
John the Baptist	1st	Palestine	Prophet	7.2	
Johnson, Samuel	18th	England	Writer	4.0	
Jomelli, Niccolò	18th	Iitaly	Composer	4.6	Burney
Jones, Sir W.	18th	England	Orientalist	15.3	
Josquin des Prey	16th	Holland	Composer	4.5	Burney

== Vol 20 Kiln–Light ==
Name	Century	Country	Occupation	Columns	Contributor/Notes
Kippis, Andrew	18th	England	Nonconformist Divine	7.5	
Knox,, John	16th	Scotland	Divine	5.0	
Latimer, Hugh	15th	England	Martyr	5.0	
Laud, William	17th	England	Archbishop	5.1	
Lavoisier, Antoine Laurent.	18th	France	Chemist	5.6	
Leo X	15th	Italy	Pope	4.6	
Lewis XIV	18th	France	King	4.5	Rees's idiosyncratic spelling of Louis.
Lewis XVI	18th	France	King	9.8	Rees's idiosyncratic spelling of Louis.

== Vol 21 Lighthouse–Machinery (part) ==
Name	Century	Country	Occupation	Columns	Contributor/Notes
Linnaeus, Charles Von	18th	Sweden	Naturalist	20.0	Smith
Locke, John	17th	England	Philosopher	7.1	
Luther, Martin	16th	German	Reformer	21.5	

== Vol 22 Machinery (part)–Mattheson ==
Name	Century	Country	Occupation	Columns	Contributor/Notes
Mahomet I.	6th	Arabia	Religious Founder	12.4	
Martini, Fr. Giambatista	18th	Italy	Musician	4.7	Burney
Mary	16th	Scotland	Queen	6.0	
Maskelyne, Nevil	18th	England	Astronomer	6.0	

== Vol 23 Matthew–Monsoon ==
Name	Century	Country	Occupation	Columns	Contributor/Notes
Medici, Lorenzo	15th	Italy	Diplomat	5.6	
Melancthon	16th	Germany	Theological Reformer	4.4	
Metastasio	17th	Italy	Opera librettist	17.8	Burney
Milton, John	17th	England	Poet	15.0	
Monk, George	17th	England	General	4.1	

== Vol 24 Monster–Newton-in-the-Willows ==
Name	Century	Country	Occupation	Columns	Contributor/Notes
Moore, Lt.-Gen. John	18th	England	General	27.0	
More, Thomas	17th	England	Statesman	5.3	
Morley, Thomas	18th	England	Musician	4.4	Burney
Moses	Ancient	Egypt	Jewish Leader and Prophet	5.1	
Mutis, Joseph	18th	Spain	Physician	4.3	
Nelson, Horatio	18th	England	Admiral	26.4	
Nero	lst	Rome	Emperor	4.3	
Newton, Isaac	17th	England	Mathematician	8.3	

== Vol 25 Newtonian Philosophy–Ozunusze ==
Name	Century	Country	Occupation	Columns	Contributor/Notes
Origen	2nd	Egypt	Church Father	4.3	

== Vol 26 P–Perturbation ==
Name	Century	Country	Occupation	Columns	Contributor/Notes
Paley, William	18th	England	Natural Philosopher	6.3	
Pallas, Dr Peter Simon	18th	Prussia	Naturalist	6.6	Smith
Paul, Saint	1st	Rome	Apostle	11.0	
Peter, Simon	1st	Palestine	Apostle	5.2	
Peter I	17th	Russia	Emperor	6.2	
Petrarcha, Francesco	14th	Italy	Poet	5.2	

== Vol 27 Pertussis–Poetics ==
Name	Century	Country	Occupation	Columns	Contributor/Notes
Pitt, William, the elder	18th	England	Statesman	6.2	
Pitt, William, the younger	18th	England	Statesman	12.2	
Pius VI	18th	Italy	Pope	8.2	

== Vol 28 Poetry–Punjoor ==
Name	Century	Country	Occupation	Columns	Contributor/Notes
Pombal, Sebastião José	18th	Portugal	Statesman	4.5	
Pompey	Ancient	Italy	Govt Official	4.0	
Pope, Alexander	18th	England	Poet	4.8	
Price, John	18th	England	Writer	5.6	
Priestley, Joseph	18th	England	Natural Philosopher	7.5	
Ptolemy, Claudius	Ancient	Egypt	Astronomer	5.0	

== Vol 29 Punishment–Repton ==
Name	Century	Country	Occupation	Columns	Contributor/Notes
Purcell, Henry	17th	England	Musician	11.4	Burney
Pythagoras	Ancient	Greece	Philosopher	4.7	
Quantz, John Joachim	18th	German	Musician	5.3	Burney
Ragotski, Francis	18th	Hungary	Prince	11.0	
Ralegh [sic], Sir Walter	16th	England	Adventurer	7.7	
Raphael Sazio, Da Urbino	16th	Italy	Painter	7.4	
Ray, John	17th	England	Botanist	11.9	Smith

== Vol 30 Republic–Rzemien ==
Name	Century	Country	Occupation	Columns	Contributor/Notes
Reynolds, Sir Joshua	18th	England	Painter	9.9	
Robinson, Robert	18th	England	Church Official	6.0	
Romney, George	18th	England	Painter	4.2	
Rousseau, Jean Jacques	18th	Switzerland	Writer	8.1	
Reubens, Sir Peter	17th	Belgium	Painter	5.4	
Rupert, Prince	17th	Germany	Prince	4.2	
Rush, Benjamin	18th	America	Physician	6.3	
Russell, Lord William	17th	England	Patriot	4.0	

== Vol 31 S–Scotium ==
Name	Century	Country	Occupation	Columns	Contributor/Notes
Selden, John	17th	England	Scholar	4.2	

== Vol 32 Scotland–Sindy ==
Name	Century	Country	Occupation	Columns	Contributor/Notes
Shakespeare, William	16th	England	Dramatist	20.5	
Sibthorp, John	18th	England	botanist	6.3	Smith

== Vol 33 Sines–Starboard ==
Name	Century	Country	Occupation	Columns	Contributor/Notes
Sixtus IV	15th	Italy	Pope	5.4	
Sloane, Hans	18th	Scotland	Natural Historian	5.6	
Socrates	Ancient	Greece	Philosopher	7.7	
Stanhope, George	18th	England	Divine	8.1	

== Vol 34 Starch–Szydlow ==
Name	Century	Country	Occupation	Columns	Contributor/Notes
Swift, Jonathan	18th	England	Writer	7.0	

== Vol 35 T–Toleration ==
Name	Century	Country	Occupation	Columns	Contributor/Notes
Titian	16th	Italy	Painter	4.7	

== Vol 36 Tolerium–Vermelho ==
Name	Century	Country	Occupation	Columns	Contributor/Notes
Tournefort, Joseph Piton de.	17th	France	Botanist	5.1	Smith
Vaillant, Sebastian	18th	France	Botanist	4.5	Smith
Vandyck, Sir Anthony	17th	Belgium	Painter	4.0	
Vinci, Leonardo Da	15th	Italy	Genius	7.0	
Usher, James	16th	Ireland	Archbishop	8.5	

== Vol 37 Vermes–Waterloo ==
Name	Century	Country	Occupation	Columns	Contributor/Notes
Walpole, Robert	17th	England	Politician	4.0	
Washington, George	18th	America	President	4.0	

== Vol 38 Water–Wzetin ==
Name	Century	Country	Occupation	Columns	Contributor/Notes
Watson, Richard	18th	England	Bishop and writer	18.0	
Werner, Abraham	18th	Germany	Mineralogist	4.6	
Wesley, John	18th	England	Religious Leader	4.1	
Whitbread, Samuel	18th	England	Brewer	8.0	
Wood, Anthony	17th	England	Antiquary	4.6	

== Vol 39 X–Zytomiers with Addenda ==
Name	Century	Country	Occupation	Columns	Contributor/Notes
Zwingle, Ulric	16th	Switzerland	Religious Reader	5.2	
Park, Mungo	18th	Scotland	Traveller	8.2	
Romilly, Sir Samuel	18th	England	Philanthropist	5.1	

== See also ==
- List of Rees's Cyclopædia articles
