= Listed buildings in West Bradford, Lancashire =

West Bradford is a civil parish in Ribble Valley, Lancashire, England. It contains nine listed buildings that are recorded in the National Heritage List for England. All of the listed buildings are designated at Grade II, the lowest of the three grades, which is applied to "buildings of national importance and special interest". The parish contains the village of West Bradford and surrounding countryside. Most of the listed buildings are house, farmhouses and associated structures, the others comprising a public house and a bridge.

== Buildings ==
Name and location	Photograph	Date	Notes
Pillings; 53.89589°N 2.39396°W		1722	A stone house with sandstone dressings, projecting quoins, and an imitation stone-slate roof, in two storeys and three bays. The windows are mullioned and transomed, with moulded surrounds and architraves. The doorway has an architrave, a pulvinated frieze, and a moulded pediment on console brackets decorated with acanthus leaf. Above the doorway is an inscribed plaque.
Eaves House Cottage and barn 53.89874°N 2.40530°W	—	Late 18th century	The house and barn are in sandstone with a stone-slate roof. The house has two storeys and two bays. The windows are mullioned with three lights, and the doorway, in a modern porch, has a plain surround. To the right, the barn has a wide entrance with a segmental head.
Lower West Clough Farmhouse; 53.90015°N 2.37772°W	—	Late 18th century	A limestone house with sandstone dressings and a slate roof, in two storeys and with a symmetrical three-bay front. Most of the windows are mullioned and have plain surrounds. The doorway has Tuscan pilasters and a moulded pediment. At the rear is a stair window with a semicircular head, a projecting keystone and imposts.
The Three Millstones; 53.89528°N 2.39483°W		Late 18th century	A public house in stone with a stone-slate roof, in two storeys. The main part has two bays with a central doorway. The windows are mullioned with three lights, the central light being sashed, and the doorway has a plain surround. There are single-bay extensions on both sides.
Eaves House Farmhouse; 53.89760°N 2.40807°W	—	1782	The house is in sandstone with a rendered front, sandstone dressings, quoins, and a stone-slate roof. It has two storeys and a symmetrical front of three bays. The windows on the front are modern sashes, and the doorway has a plain surround, a fanlight, and a triangular pediment inscribed with the date on console brackets. On the rear are re-set windows, a stair window with a semicircular head, and a doorway with a chamfered surround and a segmental head. In front of this is a porch with a moulded open segmental pediment on moulded brackets.
West Bradford Bridge; 53.89542°N 2.39375°W		c. 1800	The bridge carries Waddington Road over West Bradford Brook. It is in sandstone, and consists of a single segmental arch. The bridge has a solid parapet with a rounded top, and there are pilaster strips at the ends and in the centre.
Halsteads Farmhouse; 53.89932°N 2.38533°W	—	1822	A sandstone house with a stone-slate roof in two storeys and three bays. The windows are modern with plain surrounds, and the doorway, also with a plain surround, has a moulded pediment containing an inscription.
Dove Sike; 53.90195°N 2.41040°W	—	1827	A house with a sandstone front and a slate roof, in two storeys and three bays. The windows are modern, and include a French window and sashes. The doorway has a plain surround and a fanlight, and above it is a plaque inscribed with initials and the date. On the left chimney stack is a re-set inscribed stone.
Eaves Hall; 53.89885°N 2.39981°W		1922	A country house in red brick and Portland stone. It has two storeys with attics, and is in Free Renaissance style. The main front is symmetrical, and has projecting wings linked by a balcony on paired Tuscan columns. In the centre of the first floor is an open pediment with paired Ionic columns and a Diocletian window. The other windows are casements, some with architraves, and some with pediments. The west front includes mullioned windows and a Venetian window.
