= Gwaenynog =

Grade II* listed house in Denbighshire, Wales

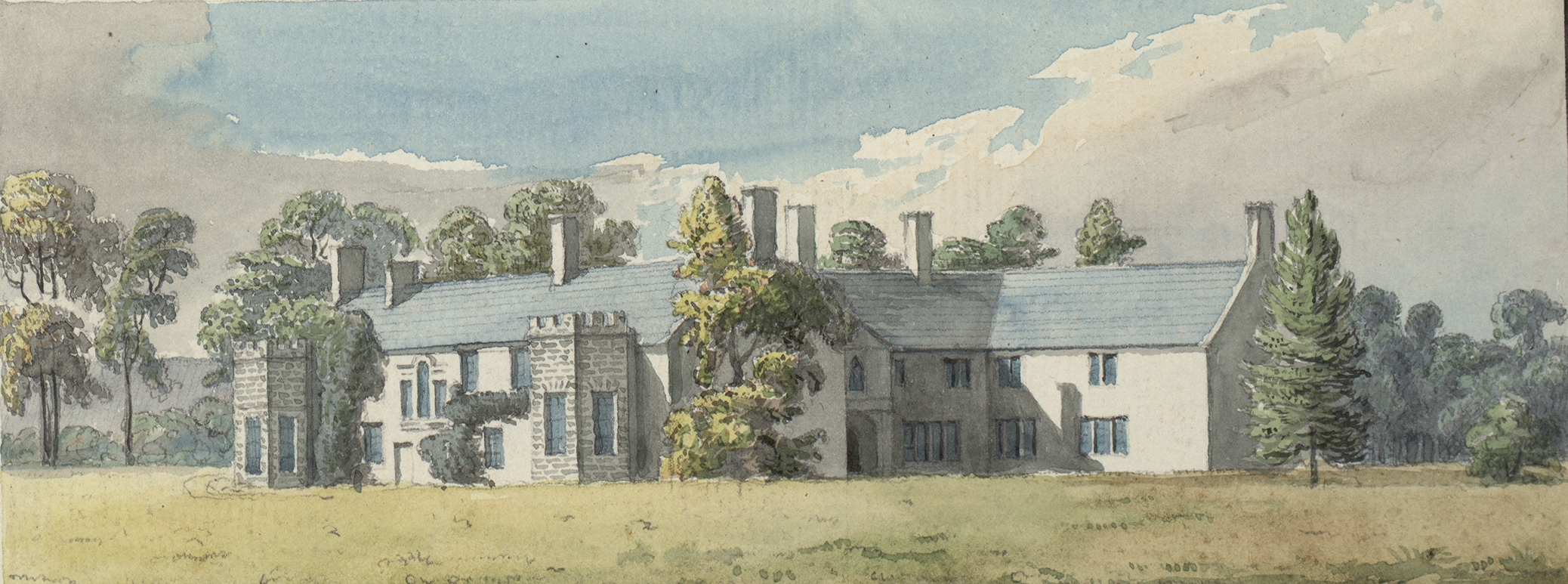

- Location within Denbighshire
- 53.1769°N 3.4453°W
- Type: House and garden
- Location: Denbigh

Site notes
- Governing body: Privately owned

Cadw/ICOMOS Register of Parks and Gardens of Special Historic Interest in Wales
- Official name: Gwaenynog
- Designated: 1 February 2022
- Reference no.: PGW(C)58(DEN)

Listed Building – Grade II*
- Official name: Gwaenynog
- Designated: 24 October 1950
- Reference no.: 1058

Listed Building – Grade II
- Official name: Garden Walls at Gwaenynog, including Mr Macgregor's Potting Shed
- Designated: 20 July 2000
- Reference no.: 23643

Listed Building – Grade II
- Official name: Dr Johnson's Monument
- Designated: 24 October 1950
- Reference no.: 1059

Gwaenynog (also spelled Gwaynynog) is an estate about 1 km (0.62 mi) to the south-west of the town of Denbigh, Wales. Its origins are mediaeval when it was built as a house for the Myddelton family. The Myddeltons claimed descent from Rhirid Flaidd, of the House of Cunedda, hereditary Kings of Gwynedd. Anglicising themselves and their name after the conquest of Wales, they thrived as prominent local landowners and politicians. Basing themselves ultimately at Chirk Castle, they served as receivers of Denbigh, governors of its castle and as members of parliament for Denbighshire and Denbigh Boroughs.

Originally the principal family house, Gwaenynog descended to a cadet branch after the purchase of Chirk. This first building was a timber-framed hall-house dating to the middle of the 16th century. Extended in the 18th century, in 1774 the then owner, Colonel John Myddleton, hosted his relative Hester Thrale and her close friend, the lexicographer Samuel Johnson, a visit Myddleton commemorated by the erection of a monument in the grounds. In the 19th century, the house passed out of Myddleton ownership and came into the possession of Frederick Burton, whose wife was an aunt of Beatrix Potter. Potter stayed at the house on many occasions between 1895-1912 and the walled kitchen garden was the inspiration for The Tale of the Flopsy Bunnies. Mr Macgregor's potting shed still stands.

The house, which remains privately owned, is a Grade II* listed building and its gardens and landscaped park are listed at Grade II on the Cadw/ICOMOS Register of Parks and Gardens of Special Historic Interest in Wales.

== History ==
The Myddelton family (variously Myddleton and Middleton) claimed lineal descendant from Rhirid Flaidd (c.1160-1207), himself descended from the kings of both Gwynedd and Powys. From the reign of Edward IV, when David Myddelton served as Receiver for North Wales, the family established themselves as landowners and politicians, serving as governors of Denbigh Castle and as members of parliament for Denbighshire and Denbigh Boroughs. During this period, Gwaenynog was the family's main home in North Wales, but was superseded in around 1590, when Thomas Myddleton (1550-1631), Lord Mayor of London, bought Chirk Castle as his principal seat. Gwaenynog passed to a cadet branch of the family, and declined in importance.

In the 18th century, when home to Colonel John Myddleton, the estate was embellished with a Neoclassical monument erected to commemorate a visit to Gwaenynog by Hester Thrale and her friend, Samuel Johnson. While Johnson appeared to enjoy Myddleton's company, remarking that he was "the only man who in Wales has talked to me of literature", he was less impressed by the monument itself suggesting, "it looks like an intention to bury me alive".

In the late 19th century, the Gwaenynog estate was bought by Oliver Burton (son of James Burton), on whose death it passed to his younger brother, Frederick Burton, whose wife Harriet was Beatrix Potter's aunt. Potter spent many holidays at Gwaenynog and its gardens, particularly the walled kitchen garden, provided inspiration for her story, The Tale of the Flopsy Bunnies, published in 1909. Potter undertook many drawings of the gardens which formed the basis of her illustrations for the book. (Note: A collection of Potter's drawings of the gardens at Gwaenynog is held at the Victoria and Albert Museum.) Mr Macgregor's potting shed still stands and is itself a Grade II listed structure, along with the kitchen garden walls.

Gwaenynog remains the private home of the Burton family although the gardens generally open in the summer.

== Architecture and description ==
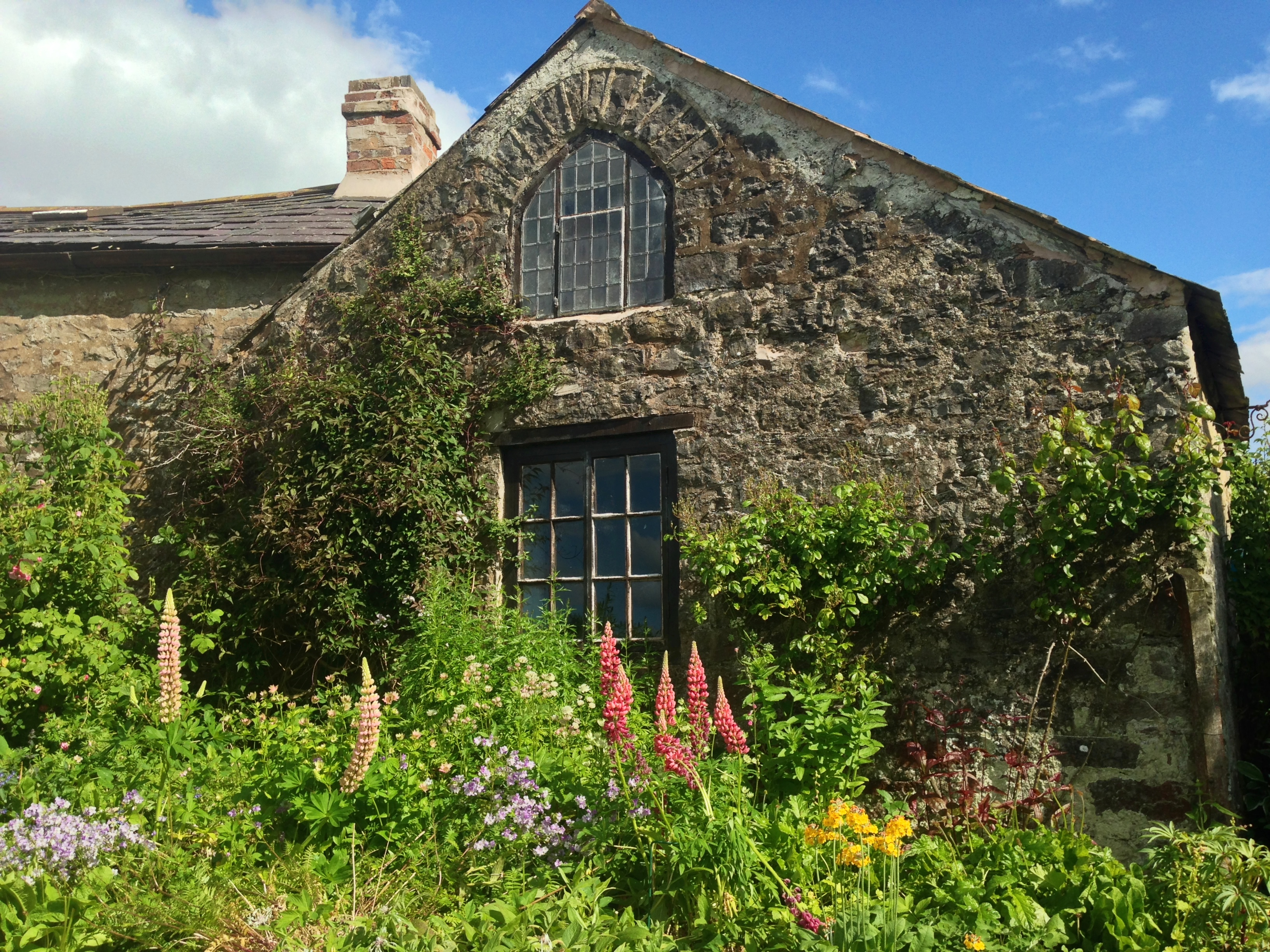
Mr McGregor’s Potting Shed in the Gardens of Gwaenynog.

The Royal Commission on the Ancient and Historical Monuments of Wales describes Gwaenynog as a "rambling 19th century mansion", its Tudor elements concealed under later renovations and enlargements. (Note: As with the Myddletons, Gwaenynog has a number of variant spellings, RCAHMW favouring Gwaynynog.) Cadw notes the house's "complex and irregular plan." Of two main storeys, the house was greatly altered in the 18th and 19th centuries. Edward Hubbard, in his Clwyd volume of The Buildings of Wales series, suggests that the 18th century styles retain greater presence in the interior, while the exterior is largely encased in a Tudor Gothic makeover of the 1870s. The house is listed at Grade II*. The gardens are designated Grade II on the Cadw/ICOMOS Register of Parks and Gardens of Special Historic Interest in Wales, and the walled kitchen garden, and the column commemorating Dr Johnson's visit have their own Grade II listings.

== Sources ==
- Hubbard, Edward (2003) [1986]. Clwyd. The Buildings of Wales. New Haven, US and London: Yale University Press. ISBN 0-300-09627-5.
