= The Tale of the Flopsy Bunnies =

Children's book by Beatrix Potter

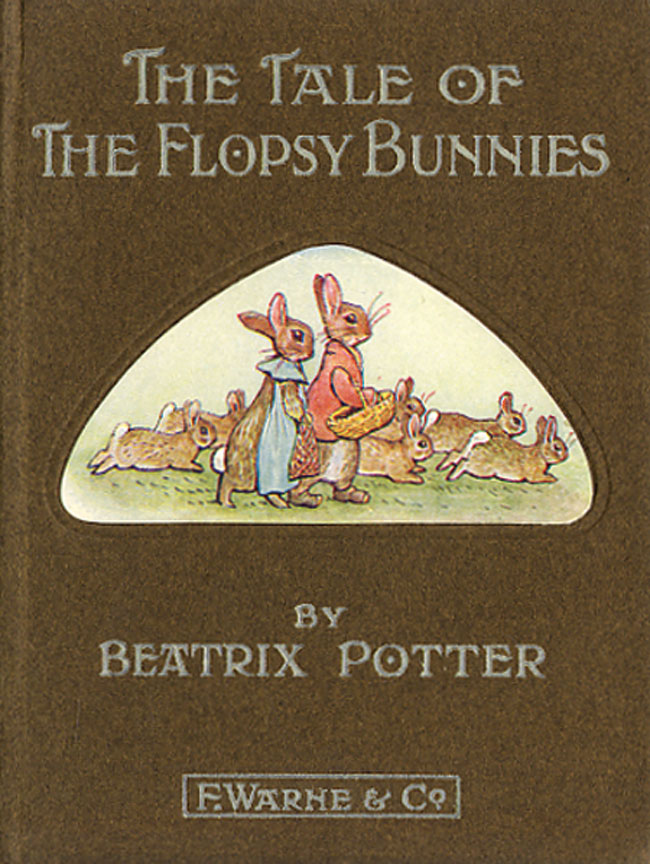
- First edition cover
- Author: Beatrix Potter
- Illustrator: Beatrix Potter
- Language: English
- Genre: Children's literature
- Publisher: Frederick Warne & Co.
- Publication date: July 1909
- Publication place: England, United Kingdom
- Media type: Print (hardcover)
- Preceded by: The Tale of Samuel Whiskers or The Roly-Poly Pudding
- Followed by: The Tale of Ginger and Pickles
- Text: The Tale of the Flopsy Bunnies at Wikisource

The Tale of The Flopsy Bunnies is a children's book written and illustrated by Beatrix Potter, and first published by Frederick Warne & Co. in July 1909. After two full-length tales about rabbits, Potter had grown weary of the subject and was reluctant to write another. She realized however that children most enjoyed her rabbit stories and pictures, and so reached back to characters and plot elements from The Tale of Peter Rabbit (1902) and The Tale of Benjamin Bunny (1904) to create The Flopsy Bunnies. A semi-formal garden of archways and flowerbeds in Wales at the home of her uncle and aunt became the background for the illustrations.

In The Flopsy Bunnies, Benjamin Bunny and his cousin Flopsy are the parents of six young rabbits called simply the Flopsy Bunnies. The story concerns how the Flopsy Bunnies, while raiding a rubbish heap of rotting vegetables, fall asleep and are captured by Mr. McGregor who places them in a sack. While McGregor is distracted, the six are freed by Thomasina Tittlemouse, a woodmouse, and the sack is filled with rotten vegetables and a brush by Benjamin and Flopsy. At home, Mr. McGregor proudly presents the sack to his wife, but receives a sharp scolding when she discovers its actual content.

Modern critical commentary varies. One critic points out that the faces of the rabbits are expressionless while another argues that the cock of an ear or the position of a tail conveys what the faces lack. One critic believes the tale lacks the vitality of The Tale of Peter Rabbit which sprang from a picture and story letter to a child. Most agree though that the depictions of the garden are exquisite and some of the finest illustrations Potter created.

== Background ==
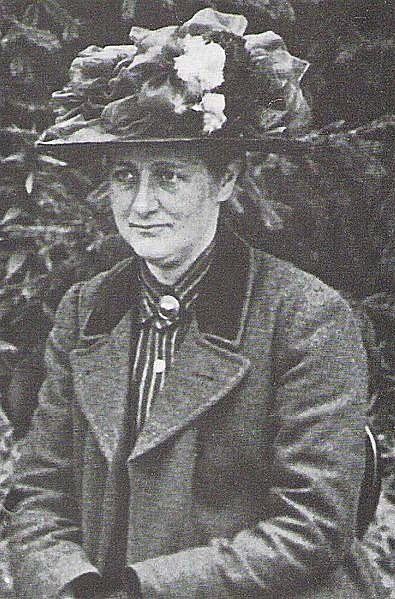
Potter, 1912

The Tale of Peter Rabbit and its three sequels are the best known and most successful of Potter's books. The author had an affinity for rabbits; she lived with them as pets and observed them closely for years. Though she once wrote that rabbits were creatures of "warm volatile temperaments" and were "shallow and extremely transparent", she invested her rabbits with a variety of characterizations consistent with the nature of the animal. All the rabbit tales were inspired in part by Joel Chandler Harris's Uncle Remus stories, which Potter began illustrating as early as 1893 in an attempt to find career direction and probably because they featured a rabbit as principal player. Although she incorporated Harris's "rabbit-tobacco" and his "lippity-clippity, clippity-lippity" (as "lippity-lippity") into her literary vocabulary, she was unable to bring his characters to the English country garden as Victorian gentlemen – they remained inexorably fixed in the Antebellum American South as slaves and slave owners. Harris's wily Br'er Rabbit is motivated by vengeance and wins by cunning, but Potter's rabbits have no such motivation and succeed due to their adventurous spirit and pure luck.

Helen Beatrix Potter was born in Kensington, London on 28 July 1866 to wealthy parents, and educated at home by a series of governesses and tutors. She displayed artistic talent early, drawing and sketching mammals, insects, reptiles and amphibians, flowers and plants. In the early 1890s, she enjoyed her first professional artistic success when she sold six designs to a greeting card publisher. On 16 December 1901, she privately issued The Tale of Peter Rabbit, and, on 2 October 1902, a trade edition of the tale was released by Frederick Warne & Co. to great success. She published tales similar in content, style, and format for Warnes in the years to follow, and, in 1904, The Tale of Benjamin Bunny, a sequel to Peter Rabbit. In July 1905, Potter bought Hill Top, a working farm in the Lake District with the profits from her books and a small legacy left her by an aunt; the farm became her home away from London and her artistic retreat. In a few years, Potter had established her own career, income, and home.

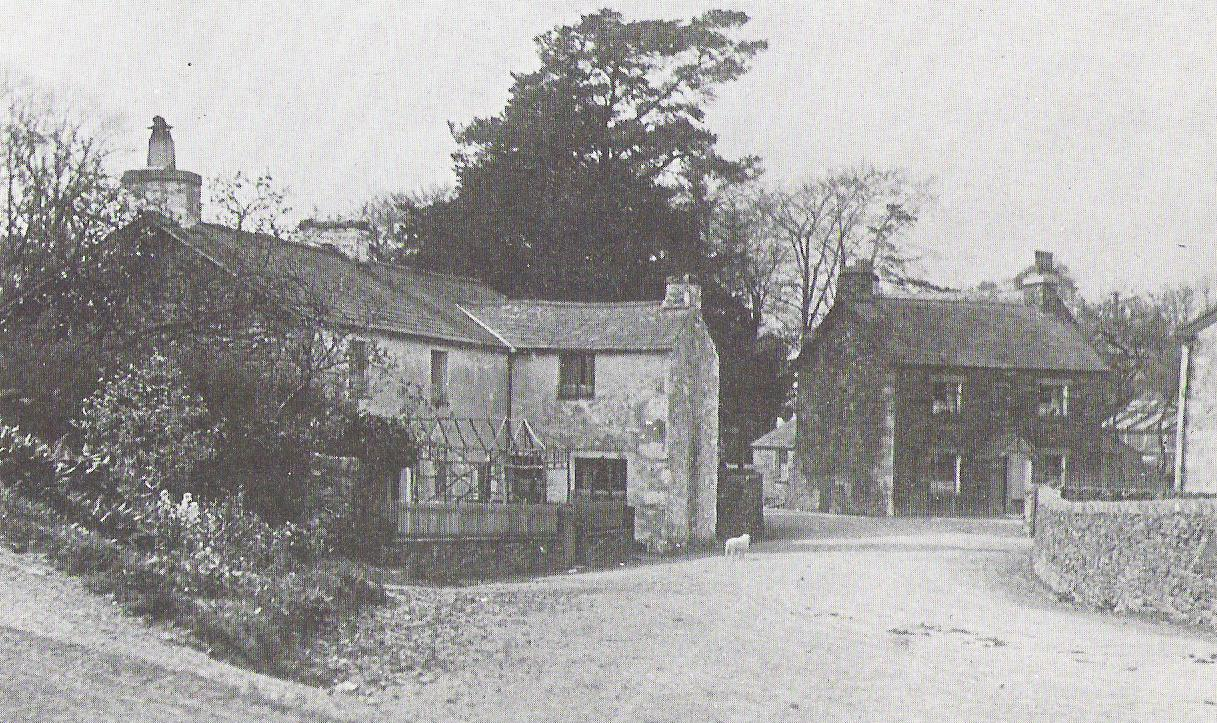
The main street in Near Sawrey photographed by Potter's father in May 1913

Early in the autumn of 1908, Potter wrote her publisher Harold Warne that she had several ideas for new books. She sent him the text of The Faithful Dove, a tale set in Rye she had composed years earlier and for which she had produced a group of sketches. With it, she included a sequel to The Tale of Benjamin Bunny starring Benjamin's offspring, The Flopsy Bunnies. Though she had complained at times that the rabbit characters had become "wearisome", she had written a young fan, William Warner, that children liked her rabbits best and that she ought to write another rabbit book. The third tale she sent Warne was about the village shop in Sawrey. "I should like to get rid of one of them," she wrote Warne about her story ideas, "When a thing is once printed I dismiss it from my dreams! & don't care what becomes of the reviewers. But an accumulation of half finished ideas is bothersome." The Tale of the Flopsy Bunnies and the story about the shop (eventually The Tale of Ginger and Pickles) were chosen for publication in 1909. The Tale of the Flopsy Bunnies was finished in March 1909 and published in July of the same year.

In conjunction with the tale, Potter created a series of letters from The Flopsy Bunnies decreasing in size and competence of execution according to each bunny's position in the family. The letters from the youngest fifth and sixth bunnies are miniature epistles of nothing but scribbles and kisses. Thomasina Tittlemouse, the tale's "resourceful" heroine, became the main character of her own book in 1910 titled The Tale of Mrs. Tittlemouse.

== Plot ==
In The Flopsy Bunnies, Benjamin Bunny (son of Old Mr. Bunny) and Peter Rabbit are adults, and Benjamin has married his cousin Flopsy (one of Peter's sisters). Benjamin and Flopsy are the parents of six young rabbits generally called The Flopsy Bunnies. Benjamin and Flopsy are "very improvident and cheerful" and have some difficulty feeding their brood. At times, they turn to Peter Rabbit (who has gone into business as a florist and keeps a nursery garden), but there are days when Peter cannot spare cabbages. (Note: In the original frontispiece to the tale, a sign over the garden tended by Peter and his mother reads, "Peter Rabbit and Mother – Florists – Gardens neatly razed. Borders devastated by the night or year". The illustration was eventually replaced (probably in the third printing) because of the difficulty in lettering the noticeboard in non-English editions.) It is then that the Flopsy Bunnies cross the field to Mr. McGregor's rubbish heap of rotten vegetables.

One day they find and feast on lettuces that have shot into flower, and, under their "soporific" influence, fall asleep in the rubbish heap. Benjamin, before dozing off, puts a sack over his head. Mr. McGregor discovers them by accident when tipping grass-clippings down and places them in a sack and ties it shut then sets the sack aside while attending to another matter. Benjamin and Flopsy are unable to help their children, but a "resourceful" wood mouse called Thomasina Tittlemouse, gnaws a hole in the sack and the bunnies escape. The rabbit family (Benjamin, Flopsy, and the Flopsy bunnies) fill the sack with rotten vegetables (two decayed turnips and three rotten vegetable marrows) and an old blacking-brush to trick Mr. McGregor into thinking the Flopsy Bunnies are still in the sack. Then the animals mend the hole which Thomasina Tittlemouse made. Afterwards, they hide under a bush to observe Mr. McGregor's reaction.

Mr. McGregor does not notice the replacement (as the bunnies have replaced the six baby rabbits with the rotten vegetables), and carries the sack home (still thinking he has the six baby rabbits), continually counting the six rabbits (he says, "One, two, three, four, five, six leetle fat rabbits!"). The McGregors do not know that the Flopsy Bunnies are eavesdropping. His wife Mrs. McGregor (thinking the rotten vegetables are the six rabbits) claims the skins for herself, intending to line her old cloak with them. However, she reaches into the sack and feels the vegetables (which she had thrown out the day before) and discovers them. When she feels the rotten vegetables and brush, she becomes very, very, angry and accuses her husband of playing a trick on her (saying to him, "You silly man! You've made a fool out of me! And you have done it on purpose!"). Mr. McGregor also becomes very angry. He discovers one of the rotten marrows. After one look at it, he throws it out the window. When he does, he inadvertently hits the youngest of the Flopsy bunnies. Their parents decide it is time to go home. At Christmas, they send the heroic little wood mouse a quantity of rabbit-wool. She makes herself a cloak and a hood, and a muff and mittens.

Scholar M. Daphne Kutzer points out that Mr. McGregor's role is larger in The Flopsy Bunnies than in the two previous rabbit books, but he inspires less fear in The Flopsy Bunnies than in Peter Rabbit because his role as fearsome antagonist is diminished when he becomes a comic foil in the book's final scenes. Nonetheless, for young readers, he is still a frightening figure because he has captured not only vulnerable sleeping bunnies but bunnies whose parents have failed to adequately protect them.

== Illustrations ==
In February 1909, Potter went to Hill Top, where, kept indoors by the inclement weather, she worked diligently on the illustrations for The Flopsy Bunnies. Various gardens became the backgrounds for Peter Rabbit (Camfield Place, Lakefield, Lingholm, Tenby in South Wales, Bedwell Lodge, and Gwaenynog), and Fawe Park in Keswick became the background for Benjamin Bunny, but the background for The Flopsy Bunnies was a semi-formal garden of archways, walks, and flowerbeds in Wales at Denbigh at the estate called Gwaenynog. Gwaenynog was the home of the Burtons, Potter's uncle and aunt, and, while on holiday in 1909, Potter sketched their walled garden, and, once at home, decided to move Peter and Benjamin and their families to Wales for another Peter Rabbit sequel. A number of her preliminary sketches still survive.

Since her first visit to Gwaenynog fourteen years before the composition of The Flopsy Bunnies, Potter had sketched the garden many times. She described it following a visit in 1895: "The garden is very large, two-thirds surrounded by a red brick wall with many apricots, and an inner circle of old grey apple trees on espaliers. It is very productive but not tidy, the prettiest kind of garden, where bright old-fashioned flowers grow amongst the currant bushes." Early in 1909 she wrote to her publisher, "I have done lots of sketches – not all to the purpose – and will now endeavour to finish up the F. Bunnies without further delay."

Judy Taylor, author of several books about Potter and her works, observes that Potter had difficulty drawing the human form, and, as a result of her limitations, restricted depictions of Mr. McGregor in The Flopsy Bunnies to his hands and feet. Any awkwardness in their depictions was minimized by presenting his hands and feet in isolation and from the bunnies' point of view. In the few full-length illustrations of Mr. McGregor, the need to depict his face was eliminated by presenting him in the middle or far distance and from the rear.

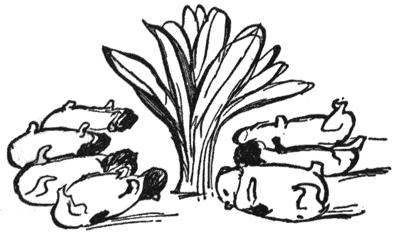
Edward Lear's picture of seven guinea pigs beneath a lettuce from The History of the Seven Families of Lake Pipple-popple possibly inspired a similar illustration in The Flopsy Bunnies.

In contrast to her limitations with the human form, MacDonald points out that Potter's mastery in the depiction of rabbits attains full flower in The Flopsy Bunnies. Potter conveys the rabbits' thoughts and emotions with the position of the tail or the ear. Benjamin, Peter, his mother, and Flopsy all wear clothes, but Flopsy wears only an apron that exposes her tail and is thus incompletely clothed in comparison to her family and by human standards. But this incompleteness in dress permits her tail to be exposed and to precisely convey her apprehension as she approaches the house across the vast expanse of the lawn in search of her babies.

Potter's weariness with depicting rabbits is reflected in the book's pictures. Of the twenty-six illustrations, eight depict Mr. McGregor and seventeen the garden and its structures. There are almost no close-ups of the rabbits and none with the detail found in Benjamin Bunny. When the rabbits are depicted, they are viewed in the middle distance in order to include all six as well as the garden background. They are depicted with little or no facial expression. It is likely Potter (a farm owner at the date of the book's composition) had come to view rabbits as undifferentiated pests rather than individual personalities. Several drawings for the illustrations for The Flopsy Bunnies were given to the British Museum in 1946.

== Themes ==
Like Peter Rabbit and Benjamin Bunny, the story of The Flopsy Bunnies is about rabbits intruding upon the human domain and bringing the threat of death and destruction upon themselves by their own imprudence. M. Daphne Kutzer, Professor of English at the State University of New York at Plattsburgh indicates in Beatrix Potter: Writing in Code that the tale's principal theme is the trickster animal, though she is careful to point out that, even then, the animals are subordinate to the exquisite garden backgrounds. The reader's interest in the tale, she believes, lies in following the joke played upon McGregor rather than in the dull personalities of the rabbits. Although the trickster qualities of the rabbits are evident but muted in the earlier Peter Rabbit and Benjamin Bunny, in Flopsy Bunnies these qualities are brought to center stage. Kutzer notes that The Flopsy Bunnies belongs not to the title characters but to their parents – it is they who save the baby bunnies – and thus the story is often of less interest to children.

Ruth K. MacDonald of New Mexico State University and author of Beatrix Potter points out that, as in Benjamin Bunny, domesticity is implicitly approved in the tale but reflects a sea-change in Potter's life and work. Peter no longer raids McGregor's garden for vegetables but grows his own and has his plot surrounded with a fence and chicken wire to keep predatory bunnies out. In effect, he has become McGregor. He is Potter's alter ego and, though he is a mature rabbit in The Flopsy Bunnies, he is still living at home with his mother and tending a garden with her – like Potter, who had achieved a degree of independence by 1909 but was not entirely free of her parents.

== Style ==
MacDonald indicates Potter was particularly sensitive to the openings and closings of her books (she insisted Benjamin Bunny end with the term "rabbit-tobacco", for example), and, in the Flopsy Bunnies, the opening reflects her flair for the elevated diction sometimes encountered in her other books: "It is said the effect of eating too much lettuce is 'soporific'." Though the word 'soporific' is not generally encountered in literature for young children, Potter is aware of her audience's limitations and not only defines the word immediately but places it in context: "I have never felt sleepy after eating lettuces; but then I am not a rabbit." She not only defines the word, but introduces rabbits as her subject. The line does not draw attention to itself (though Potter is intruding herself into the narrative), but rather gives the tale a conversational tone or a sense of the story being told aloud by a narrator. Because she immediately brings the audience's attention back to the rabbits, there is no danger she will become a character in the tale, and she is invisible through the remainder of the tale.

Potter uses elevated language again when the rabbit family is described as "improvident and cheerful". Though "improvident" is not immediately defined, the cheerfulness of the family is made evident in the accompanying illustration of the bunnies romping in their burrow while their parents look upon their offspring with placid contentment. Their improvidence is suggested however in the next two pages of text which describe Benjamin's borrowing of cabbages from his cousin Peter, and the family's occasional resort to Mr. McGregor's rubbish heap in times when Peter cannot spare any cabbages. Mr. McGregor and the rubbish heap are enduring constants in the rabbit universe of the tale, and because they are, the threat of starvation in the line "... there was not always enough to eat" is mitigated. Benjamin and Flopsy may not always be able to provide for their family, but food is available, even if it is not theirs by right. "Improvident" then is defined by course of action, and the lack of an immediate definition nonetheless carries the narrative forward and the reader's curiosity about its meaning is satisfied.

Though Mr. McGregor is a distant, awkward, menacing presence in the pictures, for the first time he is given language that serves to define him. He counts the bunnies in what is presumably a Scottish accent: "six leetle fat rabbits", and argues with his wife about buying "baccy". These and Mrs. McGregor's claim that he has tricked her and "done it a purpose" demonstrate Potter's attention to using dialect and dialogue as a means of defining character – in this instance, of contrasting their manner of speaking with her own in narrating the story.

== Tone ==
Scholars and critics detect in the narrative voice a certain lack of interest and lack of emotional involvement in The Flopsy Bunnies that they ascribe to various factors. MacDonald points out that the plot is simple and designed to capture the attention of young children, but suspects that Potter was more involved in the locale rather than the characters. Potter had at one time declared the rabbit characters "wearisome", and the brevity with which she treats them in The Flopsy Bunnies suggests that this was her attitude to the book as a whole.

Potter biographer Linda Lear, author of Beatrix Potter: A Life in Nature observes that Potter had great affection for Peter Rabbit, but the sequels never held quite the same appeal for her because neither sprang to life from story and picture letters to children in the manner of Peter Rabbit. She believes the sequels lack the sort of vitality that distinguishes Peter.

Kutzer thinks the two sequels not up to Potter's usual narrative standards because both sprang from a public demand for more "bunny books" rather than from any desire on Potter's part to continue the rabbit stories. Neither of the tales spoke to Potter emotionally in the manner of Peter Rabbit, she points out, and speculates that Potter associated rabbits with the less than happy life she passed in her parents' London home. Kutzer believes that once Potter gained a life of her own and freed herself from domineering parents, she was reluctant to return to material that evoked unpleasant memories.

== Merchandise ==
Potter asserted her tales would one day be nursery classics, and part of the process in making them so was marketing strategy. She was the first to exploit the commercial possibilities of her characters and tales with spinoffs such as a Peter Rabbit doll, an unpublished Peter Rabbit board game, and Peter Rabbit nursery wallpaper between 1903 and 1905. Similar "side-shows" (as she termed the ancillary merchandise) were produced with her approval over the following two decades.

After Potter's death in December 1943, Frederick Warne & Co. granted licences to various firms for the production of merchandise based on the Potter characters. Beswick Pottery of Longton, Staffordshire released six porcelain figurines beginning in 1965 depicting characters or scenes from the tale: Flopsy, Mrs. Tittlemouse, Benjamin Bunny, Peter Rabbit Digging, a Flopsy and Benjamin Bunny tableau, and a tableau depicting the sleeping bunnies under the lettuce. and, in 1984, Schmid & Co. of Toronto and Randolph, Massachusetts released a Flopsy Bunnies music box, a flat ceramic Flopsy Christmas ornament, and in 1985 a Flopsy music box. Stuffed toy manufacturers had sought licensing rights as early as 1906 for Potter's characters, but it was not until the 1970s that an English firm was granted worldwide rights. Their labour-intensive products were unprofitable however, and in 1972, The Eden Toy Company of New York became the exclusive manufacturer of Potter characters. Although Peter Rabbit and Mr. McGregor were released as plush toys, they were associated with the Peter Rabbit tale and not with that of The Flopsy Bunnies. None of The Flopsy Bunnies characters were released as Eden plush toys.

== Reprints and translations ==
In 2010, all of Potter's 23 small format books were still in print, and some, including The Flopsy Bunnies, were available in formats such as audiobook and Kindle. All 23 tales were available in a 400-page single volume, as individual volumes, and in complete collections of individual volumes offered in presentation boxes. First editions were available through antiquarian booksellers. The English language editions of the little books still bear the Frederick Warne imprint though the company was bought by Penguin Books in 1983. The printing plates for the Potter books were remade from new photographs of the original drawings in 1985, and all 23 volumes released in 1987 as The Original and Authorized Edition.

Potter's small format books have been translated into nearly thirty languages including Greek and Russian. The Tale of Peter Rabbit was the first of the small format books to be translated into a non-English language when Het Verhaal van Pieter Langoor was published in 1912 by Nijgh & Ditmar's Uitgevers Maatschappij, Rotterdam. Peter Rabbit has since been published in braille (1921), in the International Phonetic Alphabet (1968), and in the hieroglyphic script of the Middle Kingdom of Egypt (2005).

The Tale of The Flopsy Bunnies was published in French as La Famille Flopsaut in 1931, in Afrikaans as Die Varhall van Die Flopsie-Familie in 1935, in Dutch as Die Kleine Langoortjes in 1946 and again in Dutch as Het Verhaal van De Woolepluis-Konijntjes in 1969, in German as Die Geschichte Der Hasenfamilie Plumps in 1947, and in Japanese in 1971 under licence to Fukuinkan-Shoten, Tokyo. The tale was published in the Initial Teaching Alphabet in 1965. In 1986, MacDonald observed that the Potter books had become a traditional part of childhood in both English-speaking lands and those in which the books had been translated.

== Adaptations ==
In 1995, the story was adapted, together with The Tale of Mrs. Tittlemouse, as part of the anthology series The World of Peter Rabbit and Friends.
