= James Thomson (calico printer) =

English industrial chemist

James Thomson (6 February 1779 – 27 April 1850) was an English industrial chemist who made a career and large reputation in calico printing. He became a Fellow of the Royal Society in 1821.

== Life ==
He was born in Blackburn, Lancashire. While studying at Glasgow University he came to know Thomas Campbell, who became a friend.

The Thomson family was connected with the Peels, the manufacturing and political dynasty in Lancashire. James Thomson went to work for Joseph Peel & Co., calico printers in London, around 1795, and remained there for six years; Joseph Peel was an uncle of Sir Robert Peel, 1st Baronet. While in London Thomson met William Hyde Wollaston and Humphry Davy. Davy became a close friend, and they worked together on the theory of acids, with Thomson willing to inhale Davy's nitrous oxide in 1799. In 1801 Thomson was brought in as a middleman in negotiations for Count Rumford to hire Davy, by Thomas Richard Underwood of the Royal Institution.

The Primrose Works, set up near Clitheroe in Lancashire in 1801, became Thomson's, in partnership with James Burton and John Chippendale. The works aimed at the manufacture of prints of a high standard, and existed to 1854. Thomson innovated in technology: he took out an English patent for the Turkey red process of Daniel Koechlin in 1813, and invented his own indigo blue process with potassium bicarbonate. Some of the employees were later distinguished: Walter Crum FRS spent two years working for Thomson, and he also employed Richard Cobden about 1826 and Lyon Playfair about 1841.

Thomson gave evidence to a select committee of Parliament, on trade, manufactures and shipping, in 1833.

For Rees's Cyclopædia he contributed articles on textiles manufacture:

- Colour-making in Calico-Printing, (vol 9, 1808/9)
- Copper in Calico-printing, (vol 9, 1808/9)
- Copper Plate Work in Calico-Printing, (vol 9, 1808/9)
- Cotton, (Vol 10, 1809). In this he defended the reputation of Richard Arkwright.
- Dipping in Calico-Printing, (vol 11, 1809)
- Discharging of Colour, (vol 11, 1809)
- Manufacture of Cotton, (vol 22, 1812). John Farey, jr contributed an account of Strutt's Works at Belper and made the drawings with which the article is illustrated.
- Spinning,(vol 33, 1816)
- Printing, Calico, (vol 39, 1819)
