= Tithe dispute =

Conflicts over payment of church dues

Tithe disputes were conflicts over payment of church dues, usually those payable for agricultural produce, and were a regular source of antagonism in pre-modern England. Although these disputes were relatively common in the fourteenth and fifteenth centuries, there was an increase following the sixteenth-century Reformation; this had two major causes. Following the Dissolution of the Monasteries, the rights to tithes were often sold into private ownership and, consequently, greater numbers of people questioned their legitimacy. Secondly, the increase in religious sectarianism and competition between the differing faiths replaced the previous authority of a Catholic church based in Rome. Many of these religious groups, particularly during the late seventeenth century, were increasingly reluctant to pay for the support of a church or clergyman that did not represent their faith. There is evidence that many of the strongest Quaker communities emerged in areas which had witnessed much of resistance to tithe payments during the early seventeenth century. Whilst many of these disputes were settled without legal recourse, many did proceed to litigation, some in central courts and others in ecclesiastical courts. Several disputes were pursued in both. Records of these disputes have left extensive detail about the antagonisms and alliances in local communities in this turbulent period of English history.
