= Richard Watson Dickson =

British agriculturalist (1759–1824)

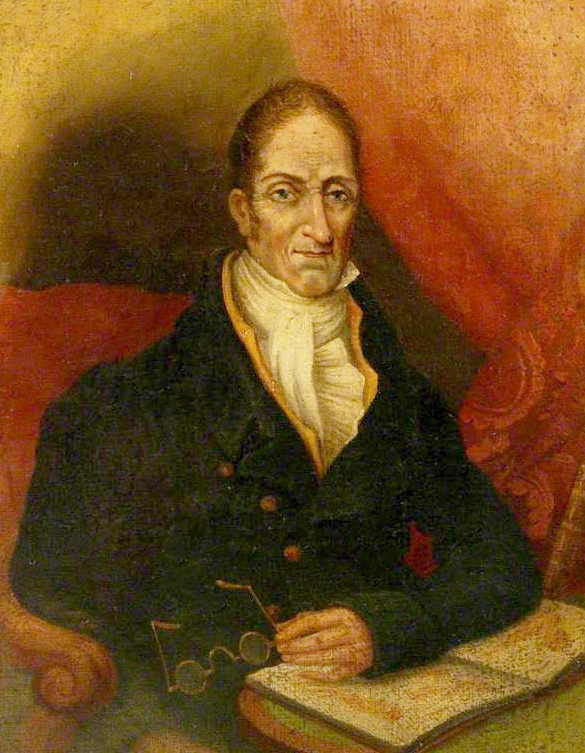
- Born: 9 November 1759; Warton, Carnforth, Lancashire
- Died: 17 September 1824 (aged 64)
- Education: St Andrew's University
- Known for: Writings on agriculture

Richard Watson Dickson (9 November 1759 – 17 September 1824) was a physician and agriculturalist.

== Biography ==
Dickson was born 9 November 1759 at Warton, Carnforth, Lancashire. He was the eldest son of William and Mary Watson. He married Elizabeth Parkinson on 16 April 1785. She died young and there were no children.

Watson studied medicine and graduated as M.D. from St Andrew's University, Aberdeen on 25 May 1787. At the time of his second marriage to Lucretia Morris on 24 January 1789 at Saint Benet, Gracechurch Street, London, he was described as being of Birmingham. Between 1790 and 1799 the couple had six children. Watson and his family initially lived at London Charterhouse, where he may have practised as a doctor, but in about 1798 they moved to Hendon, Middlesex.

Watson became interested in agriculture and wrote extensively about it. However, by 1812 he got into financial difficulties and was committed to the King's Bench debtors' prison. He was separated from his wife, and by the time of his death in 1824 he was living with his cousin Jane Dickson in Camberwell, London.

He died on 17 September 1824, and his cousin had his body placed in a sealed lead coffin in her parlour. Eventually the Coroner forced a burial, in early January 1825. His cousin was very defensive of him, and recorded that he left manuscripts of unpublished works, including an autobiography, now all lost.

== Writings ==
- Practical Agriculture, 1805, 2 vol. Translated as Der Practische Akerbau, 1807
- Dictionary of Practical Gardening, 1807, 2 vol. Pseud. published as by Alexander MacDonald.
- Edited Agricultural Magazine 1807–8, 3 vol then discontinued.
- Dictionary of Practical Gardening, 1807, 2 vol
- Grammar of Gardening 1810
- The Farmer's Companion, 1810 1 vol
- The New Botanic Garden, 1812, 2 vol
- The New Flora Britannica, 1812, 2 vol
- General View of the Agriculture of Lancashire, 1815, 1 vol
- Cattle Management, 1822, 1 vol

For Rees's Cyclopædia he contributed articles on agriculture and meteorology. There are other articles classified as Rural Economy and also Horticulture that he may well have written. He also contributed to The English Encyclopaedia, 1802
