= William Wood (botanist) =

English Unitarian minister and botanist (1745–1808)

William Wood (29 May 1745 – 1 April 1808) was an English Unitarian minister and botanist who was involved in efforts to remedy the political and educational disabilities of Nonconformists under the Test Acts.

== Life ==
Wood was born in Collingtree, near Northampton. His father was Benjamin Wood, who attended the services of Philip Doddridge. Wood was educated at Stephen Addington's school at Market Harborough, Leicestershire, then from 1761, studied for the ministry under David Jennings, Samuel Morton Savage, Andrew Kippis, and Abraham Rees.

Wood's first sermon was preached at Debenham, Suffolk in 1766 and he became minister at Stamford, Lincolnshire the following year. He subsequently preached all over London. Wood and Rees were both ordained in Southwark. Wood served for a while in Ipswich as assistant to Thomas Scott before, in 1773, succeeding Joseph Priestley at Mill Hill Chapel in Leeds, on the recommendation of Priestley himself and Richard Price, the latter having become a close friend.

He would remain in post in Leeds until his death from complications from inflammation of the bowel. He was buried in Mill Hill Chapel yard.

== Doctrine and activism ==
Though his father was a Calvinist, Wood did not follow him. He rejected belief in the Trinity but, as was common at the time, he did not pronounce on doctrinal matters during his sermons. Wood published several collections of sermons and a liturgy, Form of Prayers (1801), for the use of his congregation.

Wood was active in the parliamentary campaigns against the Test and Corporation Acts, chairing a public meeting in Leeds in 1789 and becoming a county delegate to the London committee for repeal.

It was Wood who was critical in preventing the dissolution of the Manchester Academy when George Walker resigned, recommending its move to York and becoming a visitor.

== Botany ==
In Leeds, Wood took to taking horse rides for his health and discovered an interest in botany. He developed a recognised expertise and contributed to several encyclopaedia. His Herbarium was donated to the Leeds City Museum in 1951.

== Family ==
Wood married Louisa Ann Oates (1758–1806), the daughter of a wealthy Leeds family, in 1780 and they had three sons and one daughter.

- George William Wood, his eldest son, was Member of Parliament for South Lancashire, a prominent Manchester Unitarian, businessman and leader of civil society.

== Bibliography ==
- Wykes, C. L. "Wood, William (1745–1808)". Oxford Dictionary of National Biography (online ed.). Oxford University Press. doi:10.1093/ref:odnb/29899. (Subscription, Wikipedia Library access or UK public library membership required.)
