= John Scafe =

British poet (1776–1843)

- Born: 19 June 1776; London
- Died: 24 December 1843 (aged 67); Bamburgh
- Education: University College, Oxford
- Writing career
- Genres: Poetry and geology
- Notable work: King Coal's levee (1818)

John Scafe (1776–1843) was a poet and writer on geology. Scafe was born in London to William Scafe, a barrister, and Frances (née Hodgson) in June 1776. He went to University College, Oxford in January 1794 to study, but never completed a degree. He joined the army in 1799, and was appointed captain in the 43rd regiment of foot in 1805. Scafe retired from the army in around 1812, and moved to Northumberland. Scafe lived for many years at Alnwick, and sat on the committee for the Alnwick dispensary.

While in Oxford, he began writing poetry. He published a few poems in his lifetime, of which King Coal’s levee was the most celebrated. This poem was first published in 1818, with a print run of just 25 copies. It caught the attention of some of the leading geologists of the day. William Daniel Conybeare and William Buckland added some explanatory notes during the production of a second edition, in 1819, and two further editions were published in 1819 and 1820. Buckland helped to bring the poem to the attention of a publisher, greatly expanding the print run of the later editions.

In 1820, A Geological Primer in Verse With A Poetical Geognosy, Or, Feasting and Fighting and Sundry Right Pleasant Poems, with Notes to which is Added a Critical Dissertation on King Coal's Levee was published, anonymously, as a critique of Scafe's poem. The primer was later ascribed to the geologist Robert Bakewell, but is sometimes misattributed to Scafe himself.

Literary scholar Kent Linthicum has argued that the brief popularity of Scafe's King Coal helped to elevate the status of coal as an economic resource, and facilitate Britain’s transformation to fossil-fuel dependence in the early 19th century.

In 1838, Scafe moved to Bamburgh. He took on the role of librarian of the Bamburgh Castle library in February 1837, and ceased in 1843. He died later that year.

== Published works ==
- Poems; in four parts (1815), Alnwick.
- King Coal's levee, or Geological etiquette. With explanatory notes. To which is added The council of the metals (1818) printed by J. Graham, J., Fenkle-Street, Alnwick. 29 pp
- King Coal's levee: or, Geological etiquette, with explanatory notes, to which is added The council of the metals (1819, 2nd. ed) printed by J. Graham, J., Fenkle-Street, Alnwick. 84 pp
- The Genius and Other Poems (1819), printed by S. Hodgson for Emerson Charnley, Bigg-Market, Newcastle. 160 pp.
- King Coal's levee: or, Geological etiquette, with explanatory notes; and The council of the metals. Fourth Edition, to which is added Baron Basalt's Tour (1820), Longman, Hurst, Rees, Orme, and Brown, London. 119 pp.
- Court news; or, The peers of king Coal: and The errants; or A survey of British strata: with notes. (1820). Longman, Hurst, Rees, Orme, and Brown, London. 61 pp.
