= Eaves Hall =

Country house in Lancashire, England

Coordinates: 53.8989°N 2.3999°W

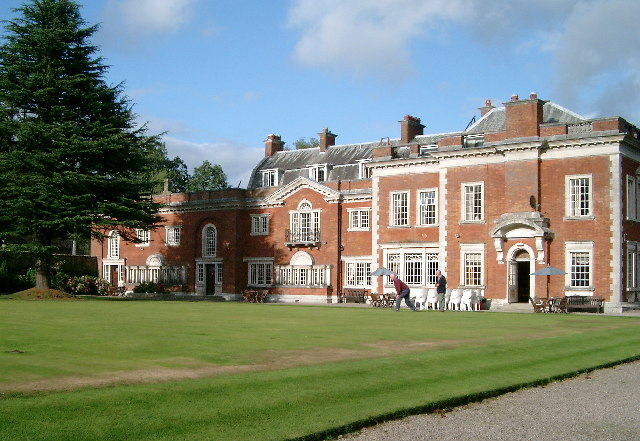
Eaves Hall

Eaves Hall was built in 1864 for John Burton (1809–1879), first son of James Burton and a wealthy cotton mill-owner.

Sold by the Burtons in 1938, having been let since the end of 1904, it became a hotel for senior civil servants. The current owner, as of 2023, is James Warburton, a local entrepreneur who owns a number of hotels in Lancashire and Yorkshire including the Emporium and Holmes Mill in Clitheroe. It is now, primarily, a wedding venue.

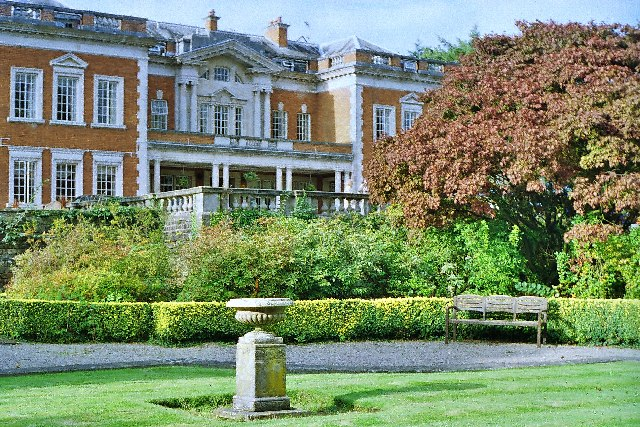
South front

== Description ==
Eaves Hall is a Grade II listed building in West Bradford, Lancashire. Listed in 1954, it is described as

... a country house in red brick and Portland stone. It has two storeys with attics, and is in Free Renaissance style. The main front is symmetrical, and has projecting wings linked by a balcony on paired Tuscan columns. In the centre of the first floor is an open pediment with paired Ionic columns and a Diocletian window. The other windows are casements, some with architraves, and some with pediments. The west front includes mullioned windows and a Venetian window.

== See also ==
- Listed buildings in West Bradford, Lancashire
- James Burton (millowner)
