= James Burton (millowner) =

British mill owner (1784–1868)

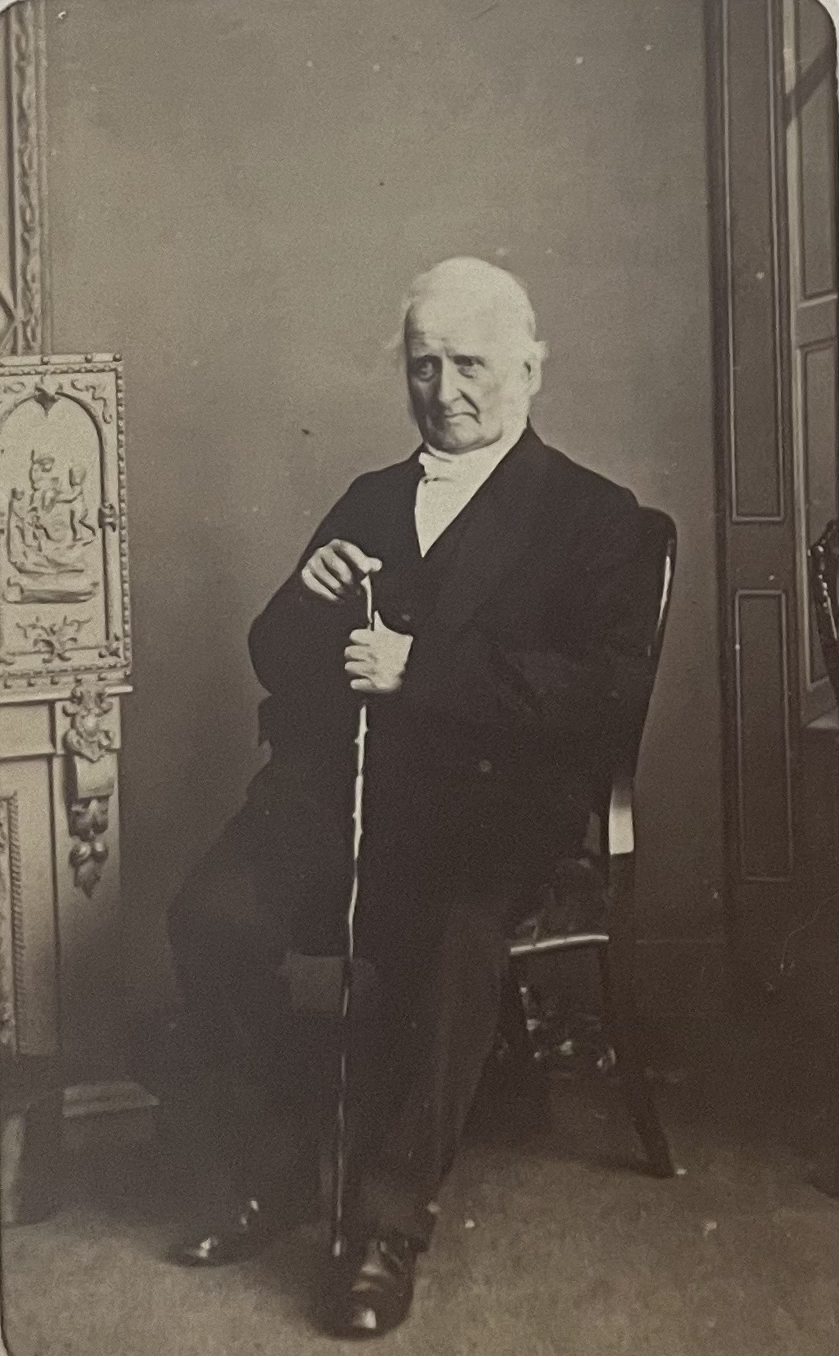
- Born: 22 September 1784; Clitheroe
- Died: 12 February 1868 (aged 83); Tyldesley, Lancashire
- Occupation: Merchant
- Spouse: Alice Hartley
- Children: 8
- Parent(s): Oliver Burton; Ann Wilcock

James Burton (22 September 1784 – 12 February 1868) was a cotton merchant and owned several cotton mills in Tyldesley and Hindsford in the middle of the 19th century.

== Origins ==
Burton was born on 22 September 1784 in Clitheroe to Oliver Burton and Ann Wilcock. His father conducted a drapery business in Clitheroe marketplace, having spent time as a millwright.

== Career ==
Burton moved to Tildsley Banks in 1828 where he entered into partnership with John and Richard Jones at Tyldesley New Mill but the brothers were more interested in silk weaving and moved to Bedford. By 1838 he owned many properties in the west end of the town, where he lived in Charles Street, and in Hindsford across the Hindsford Brook. In 1845 his firm was named Burton, Chippendale and Company but the partnership was dissolved.

James Burton & Sons was the biggest mill-owning business in the area in the middle of the 19th century. Burton built a cluster of cotton mills in Hindsford starting with Atherton Mill in 1839, followed by Lodge Mill in 1853, Field Mill in 1856, and Westfield Mill in 1860, all of which were supplied with water by the Hindsford Brook.

Burton was a Liberal. He represented Tyldesley on the Board of Guardians of the Leigh Poor Law Union.

== Marriage and children ==
On 23 July 1807 in Church, Lancashire, he married Alice Hartley (1788–1840), by whom he had issue including:

- John Burton (1809–1879), eldest son and heir, of Eaves Hall, West Bradford. No issue.
- James Burton Jr (1819–1865), of Hilton House, Prestwich.
- Oliver Burton (1822–1883), of Gwaenynog, Denbighshire, High Sheriff of Denbighshire. No issue.
- Edward Burton (1825–1898), of Eaves Hall.
- Frederick Burton (1828–1913), youngest son, of Gwaenynog and of Hopefield, Pendleton. Inherited the mills and the business. High Sheriff of Denbighshire.

Oliver, Frederick, Frederick's son (John Frederick Burton) and John Frederick Burton's son (Capt. John Oliver Burton) served as High Sheriffs of Denbigh.

James Burton Jr's son, James Hartley Burton (of Fryars), served as mayor of Beaumaris eighteen times and James Hartley Burton's daughter, Mary Conway Burton, served as mayor four times and as High Sheriff of Anglesey, the first woman to do so.

== Death and burial ==
He died on 12 February 1868 and is buried in St George's churchyard.

After his death, his sons, Edward and Frederick, continued the business; a fire at the mills caused £15,000 damage in November 1883 and in 1891, Burton's mills had 157,196 spindles and 570 looms until the mills were stripped of machinery and demolished in 1926.

== See also ==
- List of mills in Wigan
- Eaves Hall
- Gwaenynog Hall
- Fryars
