= Robert Bakewell (geologist) =

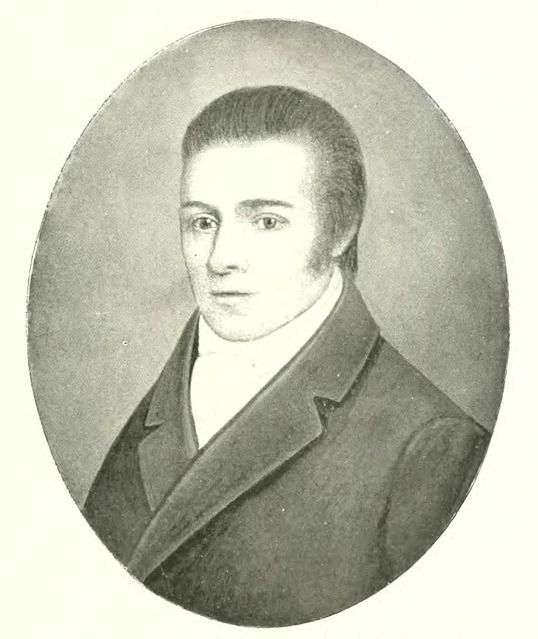
- Born: 10 March 1767; Nottingham

Robert Bakewell (10 March 1767 – 15 August 1843) was an English geologist.

== Life ==
Bakewell was born in Nottingham in 1767. He was an able observer, and deserving of mention as one of the earliest teachers of general and practical geology. From 1811 onwards, he lectured on geology all over the country, exhibiting sections of rock formation and a geological map, the first of its kind.

His Introduction to Geology (1813) contained much sound information, and reached a fifth edition in 1838. The second edition was translated and published in Germany, and the third and fourth editions were reprinted in America by Professor Silliman of Yale College.

In 1820, A Geological Primer in Verse With A Poetical Geognosy, Or, Feasting and Fighting and Sundry Right Pleasant Poems, with Notes to which is Added a Critical Dissertation on King Coal's Levee was published. At the time this was published anonymously, but it was later ascribed to Bakewell. The critical dissertation refers to a critique of a poem published in 1818 by John Scafe.

He died at Hampstead on 15 August 1843.

== Works ==
- Introduction to Geology (1813 / 1815 / 1833 / 1838)
- Introduction to Mineralogy (1819)
- Travels comprising Observations made during a Residence in the Tarentaise, &c. (2 vols., 1823).
- Suggestions Relative to the Philosophy of Geology, as Deduced from the Facts (1839, online)

For Rees's Cyclopædia he contributed articles on Geology, Mineralogy, Rock, Strata, Wool and Worsted.
