= Edmund Turrell =

English engraver and civil engineer

Edmund Turrell (1781 – May 1835) was an English engraver and civil engineer.

== Biography ==
He lived at 46 Somers Town, London. Nothing has been discovered about his ancestry and early life. He was involved with the civil engineer Thomas Telford, for whom he engraved the 65 plates in Telford's autobiography. Turrell was elected an Associate of the Institution of Civil Engineers in 1823. He also was known as an architectural engraver, and employed James Carter early in his career; he may have also written his surname as "Tyrrel".

When steel engraving was introduced to the art world in the 1820s by Jacob Perkins, in 1824 Turrell received three gold medals from the Society of Arts for his etching fluid, composed of pyroligneous acid, nitric acid, and alcohol.

He married Mary Anne Rawles in 1833 in Camden.

He died aged 53 or 54 and was buried 24 May 1835 at St Marylebone Parish Church, Westminster.

== Writings ==
- "Description of an Improved Mode of Constructing Muffles for Chemical Purposes", Nicholson's Journal, xxi, 275, 1806
- For Rees's Cyclopædia, he contributed the article on Enamelling (Vol 13), 1809
