= List of names in A Biographical Dictionary of Modern Rationalists =

Joseph McCabe published A Biographical Dictionary of Modern Rationalists in 1920 (London: Watts & Co.). Most (though not all) of those listed were also included in A Biographical Dictionary of Ancient, Medieval and Modern Freethinkers (1945)

== A ==
- Firmin Abauzit
- Ernst Abbe
- Francis Ellingwood Abbot
- George Frederick Abbott
- Leonard Dalton Abbott
- Edmond About
- Thomas Achelis or Thomas Ludwig Bernhard Achelis ( mentioned in de:Thomas Otto Achelis, his son)
- ACKERMANN, Louise V.
- ACOLLAS, Professor E.
- ACOSTA, Uriel
- ADAM, Professor Charles, D. es L.
- ADAMS, Charles Francis
- ADAMS, Francis W. L.
- ADAMS, John, President of the United States
- ADAMS, Robert
- ADAMSON, Professor Robert, Ph.D.
- ADCOCK, A. St. John
- ADICKES, Professor E., Ph.D.
- ADLER, Professor Felix, Ph.D.
- AHRENS, Professor Heinrich, Ph.D.
- AIKENHEAD, Thomas
- AIRY, Sir George B., K.C.B., D.C.L., LL.D., F.R.S.
- AITZEMA, Lieuwe van
- ALBEE, John
- ALCOTT, Amos Bronson
- ALEMBERT, Jean le Rond d'
- ALFIERI, Count V.
- ALGAROTTI, Count F.
- Thomas Clifford Allbutt
- ALLEN, Grant, B.A.
- ALLEN, Colonel Ethan
- ALLEN, John. M.D.
- ALLINGHAM, William
- ALLMAN, Professor G. J., LL.D., D.Sc., F.R.S.
- ALLSOP, Thomas
- ALTMEYER, Professor J. J., Ph.D., D.C.L.
- ALVIELLA, Count Goblet d'
- AMARI, Professor M.
- AMICIS, Edmondo de
- AMIEL, Henri F.
- ANDERSON, George

== B ==
=== Ba ===
- François-Noël Babeuf
- Guido Baccelli
- Robert Bage
- Walter Bagehot
- Jens Immanuel Baggesen
- Julius Bahnsen
- Karl Friedrich Bahrdt
- Samuel Bailey
- George Baillie ()
- Alexander Bain
- Mikhail Bakunin
- James Mark Baldwin

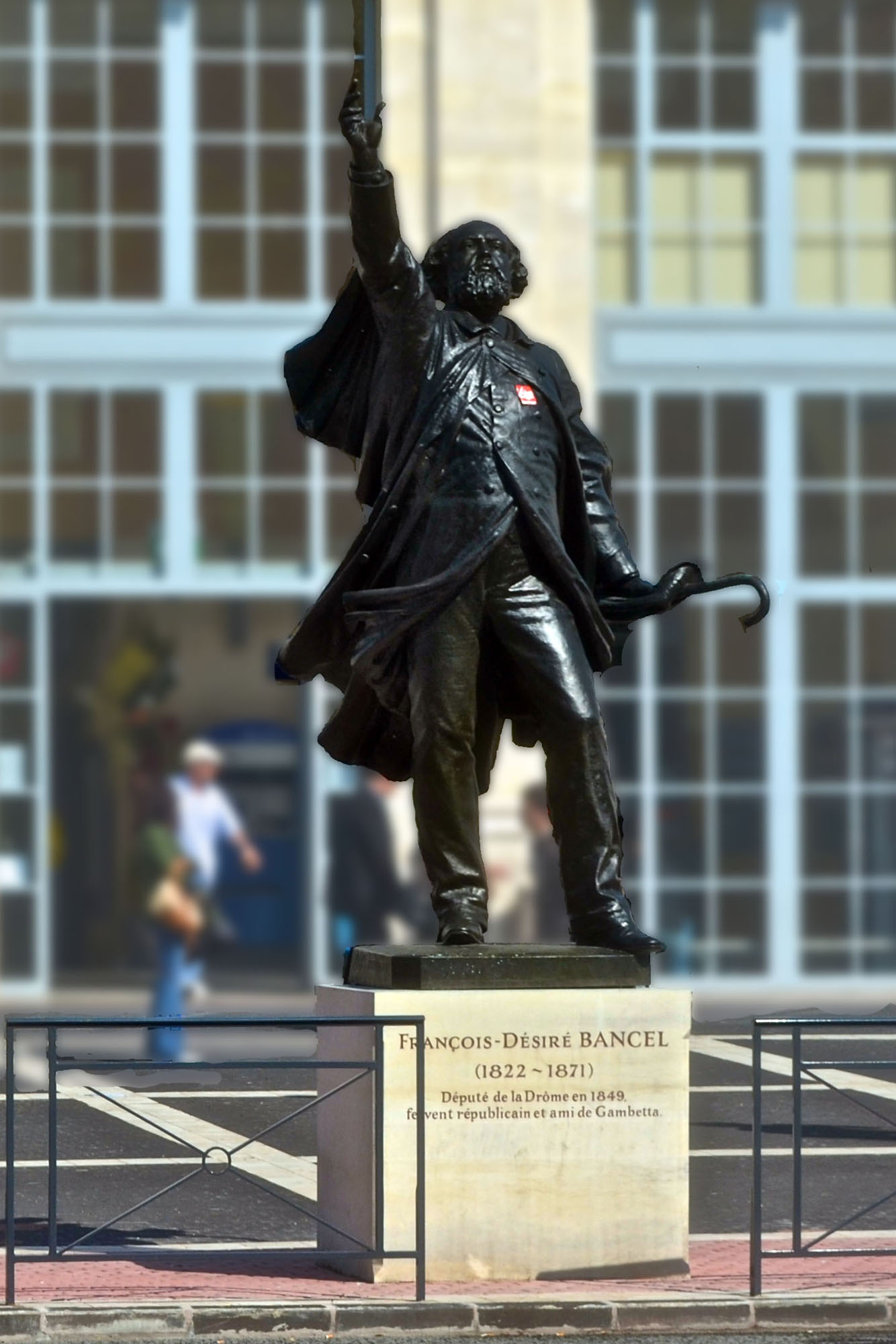
François-Désiré Bancel

- William Platt Ball ()
- John Ballance
- José Manuel Balmaceda
- Eduard Baltzer
- Honoré de Balzac
- François-Désiré Bancel ( see fr:François-Désiré Bancel)
- Hubert Howe Bancroft
- Giuseppe Baretti
- George Barlow
- Jane Barlow

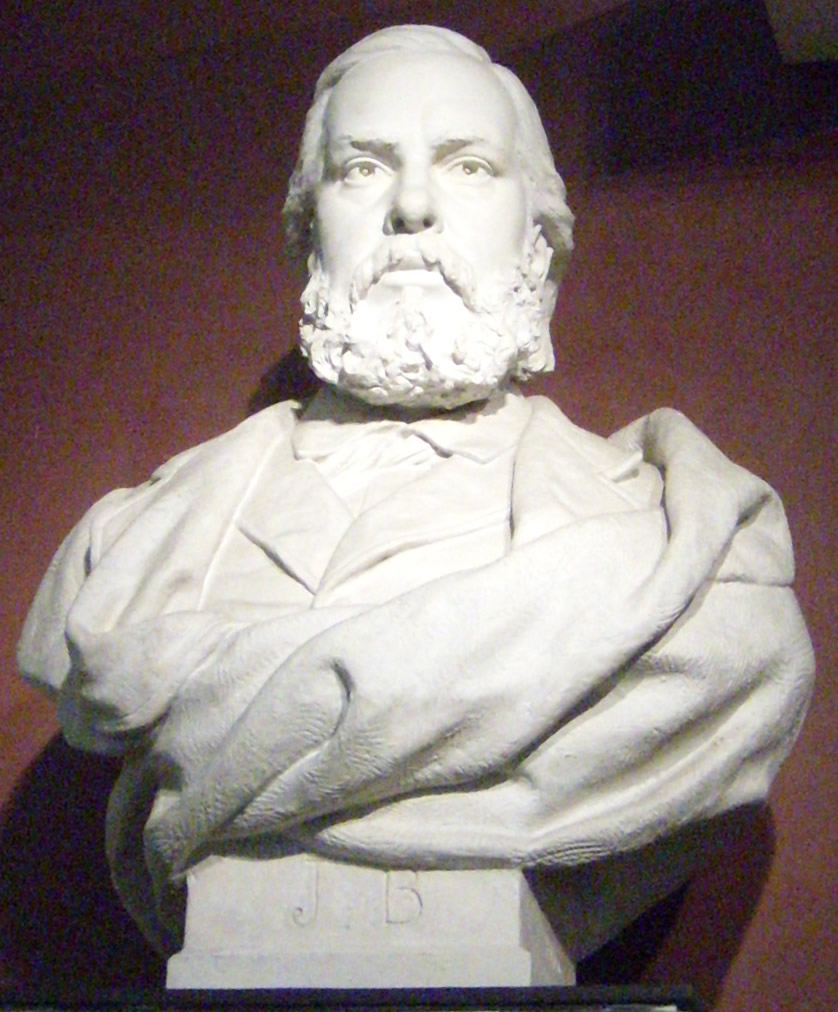
Bust of Jules Barni by Athanase Fossé

- Joel Barlow
- Antoine Barnave
- J. Edmestone Barnes ()
- Jules Barni ( see fr:Jules Barni and hu:Jules Barni)
- François Odysse Barot ()
- Thomas Squire Barrett ()
- Jules Barthélemy-Saint-Hilaire
- Paul Joseph Barthez
- Hector Alexandre Bartoli ( see fr:Hector Alexandre Bartoli)
- Theodor Bartošek ( see cs:Theodor Bartošek)
- Giacomo Barzelotti ()
- Johann Bernhard Basedow
- Marie Bashkirtseff
- John Baskerville
- Adolf Bastian
- Henry Charlton Bastian
- Frédéric Bastiat
- Henry Walter Bates
- Angelo Battelli
- Cesare Battisti
- Charles Pierre Baudelaire
- Wolf Wilhelm Friedrich von Baudissin
- Henri Baudrillart
- Bruno Bauer
- Edgar Bauer
- Ernest Belfort Bax
- Pierre Bayle

=== Be ===
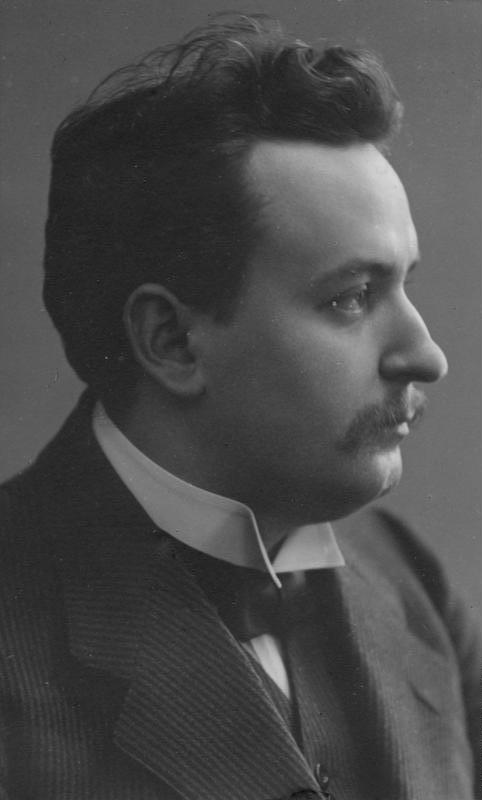
Erich Becher

- Charles Marsh Beadnell ()
- Louis de Beausobre
- August Bebel
- Cesare Beccaria
- Erich Becher ( see de:Erich Becher and sv:Erich Becher)
- Walter Frederick Becker ()
- Hubert Beckers
- William Thomas Beckford
- Thomas Beddoes
- Thomas Lovell Beddoes
- Edward Spencer Beesly
- Ludwig van Beethoven
- Elphinstone Waters Begbie ()
- Balthasar Bekker
- Thomas Evans Bell ()
- Gustave Belot
- Hedwig Bender ( see de:Hedwig Bender)
- Friedrich Eduard Beneke
- Alfred William Benn
- De Robigne Mortimer Bennett ()
- Arnold Bennett
- Jeremy Bentham
- Pierre-Jean de Béranger
- Henri Louis Bergson
- John Berkenhout
- Hector Berlioz
- Claude Bernard
- Henry Meyners Bernard ()
- Aaron Bernstein
- Eduard Bernstein
- Paul Bert
- Agostino Bertani
- Marcellin Berthelot
- Claude Louis Berthollet
- Domenico Berti ( see it:Domenico Berti and sv:Domenico Berti)
- Alphonse Bertillon
- Louis Bertillon
- George Berwick ()
- Walter Besant
- Matilda Betham-Edwards
- Richard Bethell
- Saverio Bettinelli
- Marie-Henri Beyle

=== Bi ===
- Aurelio Bianchi-Giovini ( see it:Aurelio Bianchi-Giovini)
- Marie François Xavier Bichat
- Ambrose Bierce
- Alfred Binet
- Jean-Baptiste Biot
- William John Birch ()
- George Birkbeck
- Richard Bithell ()
- Georges Bizet
- Edwin August Björkmann ()
- Bjornstjerne Bjornson
- Grigorevich Blagosvetlov ()
- William Blake
- Louis Blanc
- Louis Auguste Blanqui
- Robert Blatchford
- Linley Blathwayt ()
- Karl Bleibtreu
- Ange François Blein ( see fr:Ange François Blein)
- Karl Blind
- Mathilde Blind
- Ivan Bloch
- Charles Blount (deist)
- Henry BLount
- Thomas Pope Blount
- Robert Blum

=== Bo ===
- Manuel Maria Barbosa du Bocage
- Barbara Leigh Smith Bodichon
- Jean Bodin
- Wilhelm Boerner ()

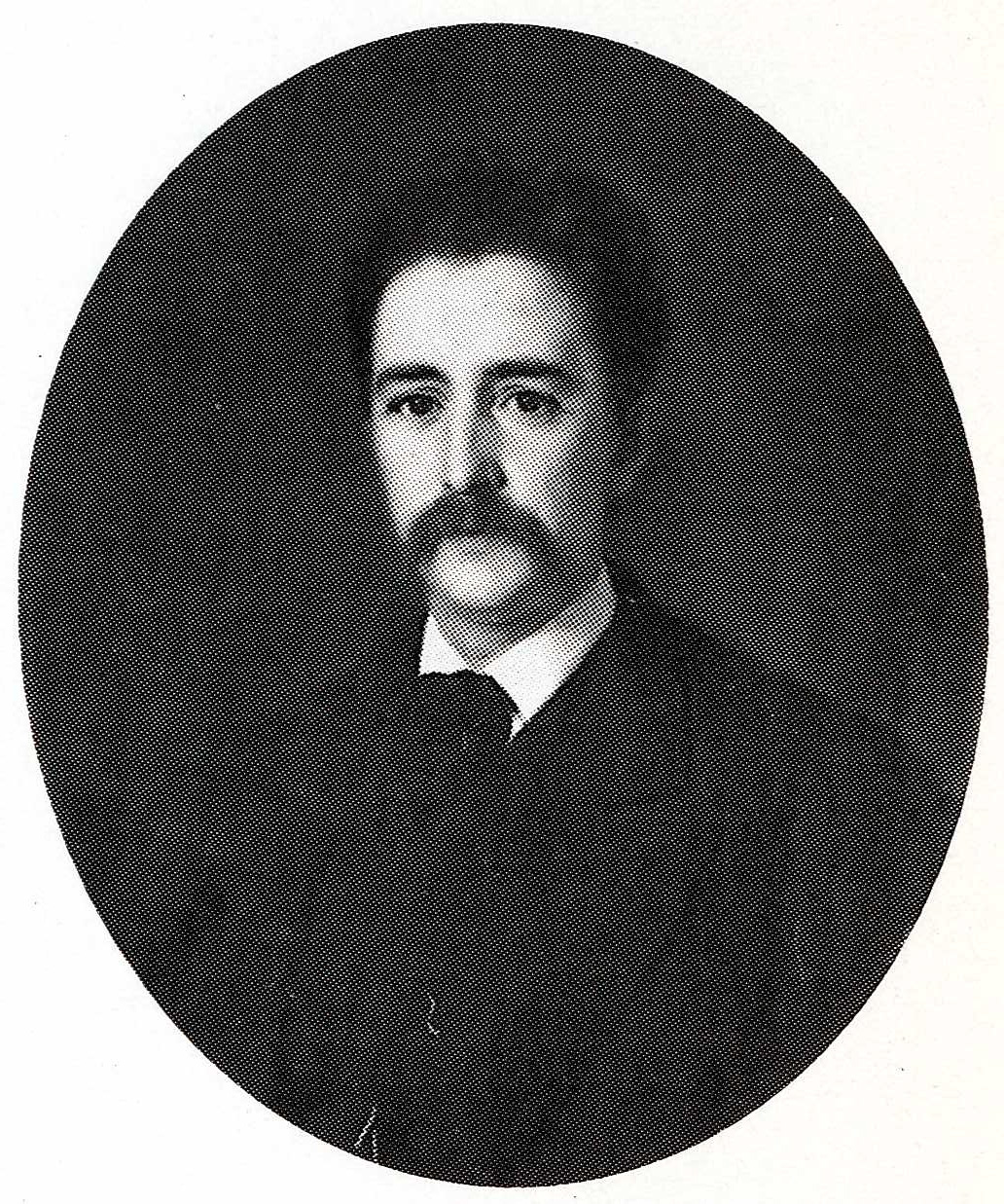
Wilhelm Bolin portrait by Bernhard Reinholdin

- Nicolas Boileau-Despréaux
- Nicolas Boindin ( see fr:Nicolas Boindin)
- Marie-Louis-Antoine-Gaston Boissier
- Arrigo Boito
- Johan Bojer
- Wilhelm Bolin ( see fi:Wilhelm Bolin and sv:Wilhelm Bolin)
- Henry St John, 1st Viscount Bolingbroke
- Simón Bolívar
- Wilhelm Bolsche
- Bernard Bolzano
- Jérôme Bonaparte

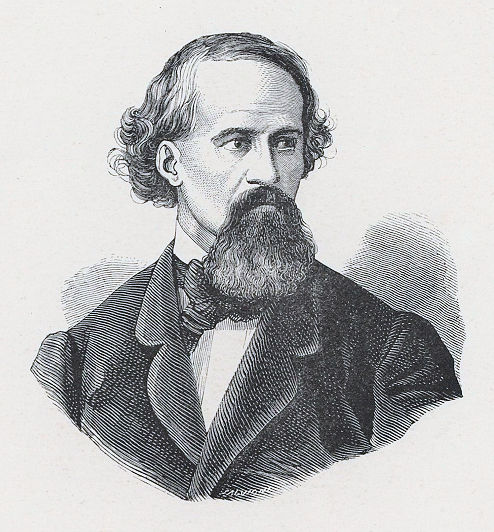
Filippo de Boni portrait by Aristide Calani

- Napoléon Joseph Charles Paul Bonaparte
- Ruggero Bonghi
- Rosa Bonheur
- Filippo de Boni ( see it:Filippo De Boni)
- Charles Bonnet
- John Bonnycastle
- Charles Victor de Bonstetten
- James Bonwick
- James Booth (lawyer) ()
- Ignaz von Born
- Ludwig Börne
- George Borrow
- Bernard Bosanquet
- Louis Augustin Guillaume Bosc
- Christopher Jacob Boström
- Jacques Boucher de Crèvecœur de Perthes
- Louis Antoine de Bougainville
- Célestin Charles Alfred Bouglé
- Francisque Bouillier
- Henri de Boulainvilliers
- Nicolas Antoine Boulanger
- Léon Bourgeois
- Désiré-Magloire Bourneville
- Émile Boutmy
- Émile Boutroux
- Giovanni Bovio
- Charles Bowen, Baron Bowen
- Charles Bowman (secularist) ()
- Hjalmar Hjorth Boyesen

=== Br ===
- Edward William Brabrook
- Charles Bradlaugh
- Hypatia Bradlaugh Bonner
- Francis Herbert Bradley
- Hans Lien Brækstad ( see book translated? by him)
- Teófilo Braga
- Johannes Brahms

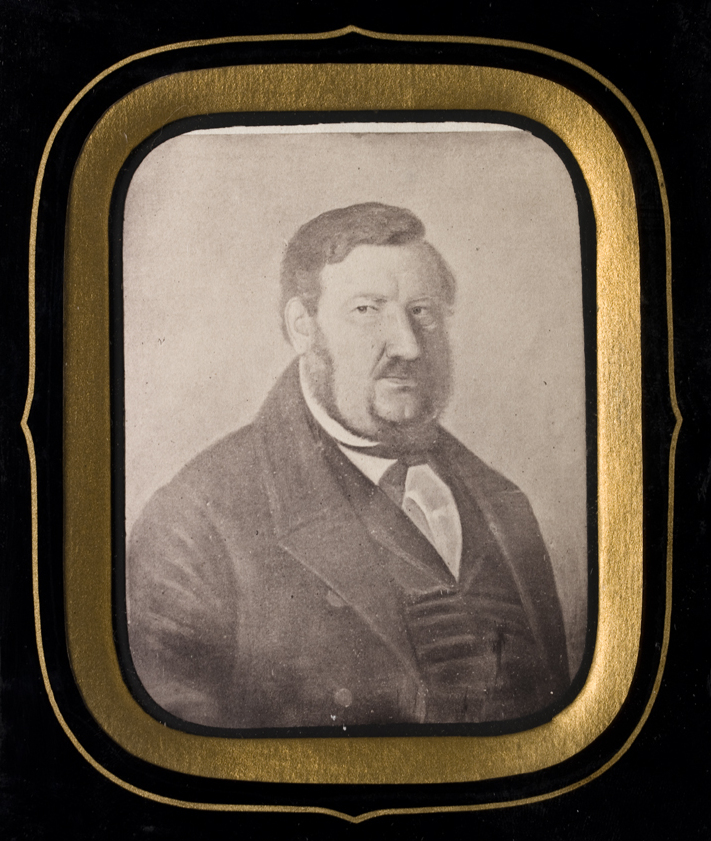
Daguerreotype of Wilhelm von Braun

- George Bramwell
- Edvard Brandes
- Georg Brandes
- Louis Brandin ()
- Hjalmar Branting
- Lily Braun
- Wilhelm von Braun ( see sv:Wilhelm von Braun)
- Charles Bray
- Wilhelm Breitenbach ()
- Franz Brentano
- E. Cobham Brewer
- Henry Brewster (writer) ()
- Aristide Briand

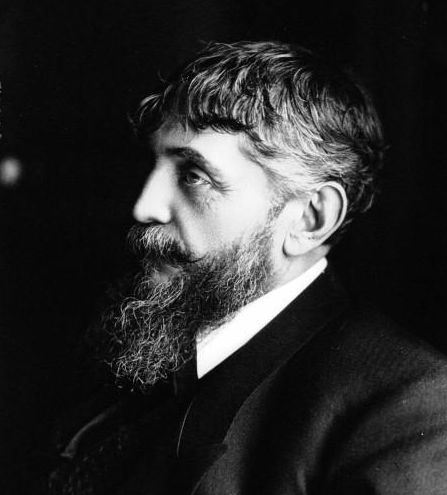
Adolphe Brisson

- Horace J. Bridges ()
- John Henry Bridges ()
- Eugene Brieux
- Daniel Garrison Brinton
- Adolphe Brisson ( see fr:Adolphe Brisson)
- Eugène Henri Brisson
- Jacques Pierre Brissot
- Augusta Cooper Bristol ()
- Paul Broca
- Benjamin Collins Brodie
- Rupert Brooke
- Stopford Augustus Brooke
- William Brooksbank (writer) ()
- Charles de Brosses
- François-Joseph-Victor Broussais
- Arthur Brown (jurist) ()
- Ford Madox Brown
- George William Brown (reformer) ()
- John Armour Brown ()
- Titus L. Brown ()
- Walston Hill Brown ()
- William Montgomery Brown
- Charles-Édouard Brown-Séquard
- Thomas Browne
- William George Browne
- Robert Browning
- Giordano Bruno

=== Bu ===
- Walter James Buchanan ()
- Robert Buchanan (Owenite) ()
- Robert Williams Buchanan
- Alexander Büchner ()
- Friedrich Büchner
- Henry Thomas Buckle
- Odón de Buen y del Cos
- Georges-Louis Leclerc, Comte de Buffon
- Ferdinand Buisson
- Charles Buller
- Luther Burbank
- Jakob Burckhardt
- Karl Friedrich Burdach
- Francis Burdett
- William Burdon ()
- Thomas François Burgers
- Jean Lévesque de Burigny
- Thomas Burnet
- James Burnett, Lord Monboddo
- John Burnett
- Émile-Louis Burnouf
- Eugène Burnouf
- John Burns
- Robert Burns
- John Burroughs
- Thomas Burt
- John Hill Burton
- Richard Francis Burton
- J. B. Bury
- Samuel Butler, author of Hudibras
- Samuel Butler, novelist
- Vissarion Belinsky
- Lord Byron

== C ==
=== Ca ===
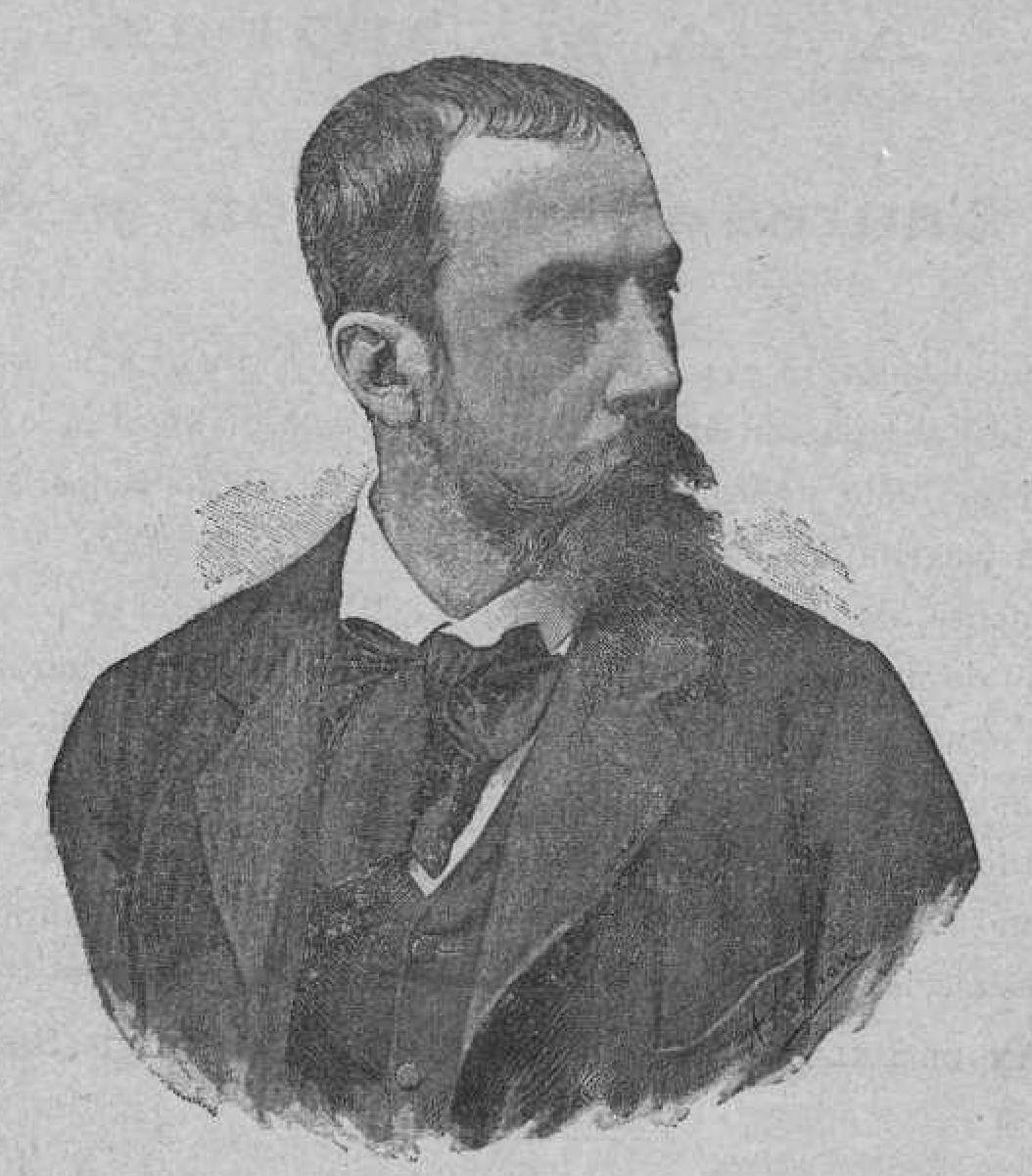
Laureano Calderón y Arana

- George-Paul-Sylvester Cabanis ()
- Pierre Jean Georges Cabanis
- William Ralph Hall Caine ()
- Wathen Mark Wilks Call ()
- Laureano Calderón y Arana ( see es:Laureano Calderón Arana)
- Salvador Calderón y Arana ( see es:Salvador Calderón y Arana)
- Charles Callaway ()
- Charles Stuart Calverley

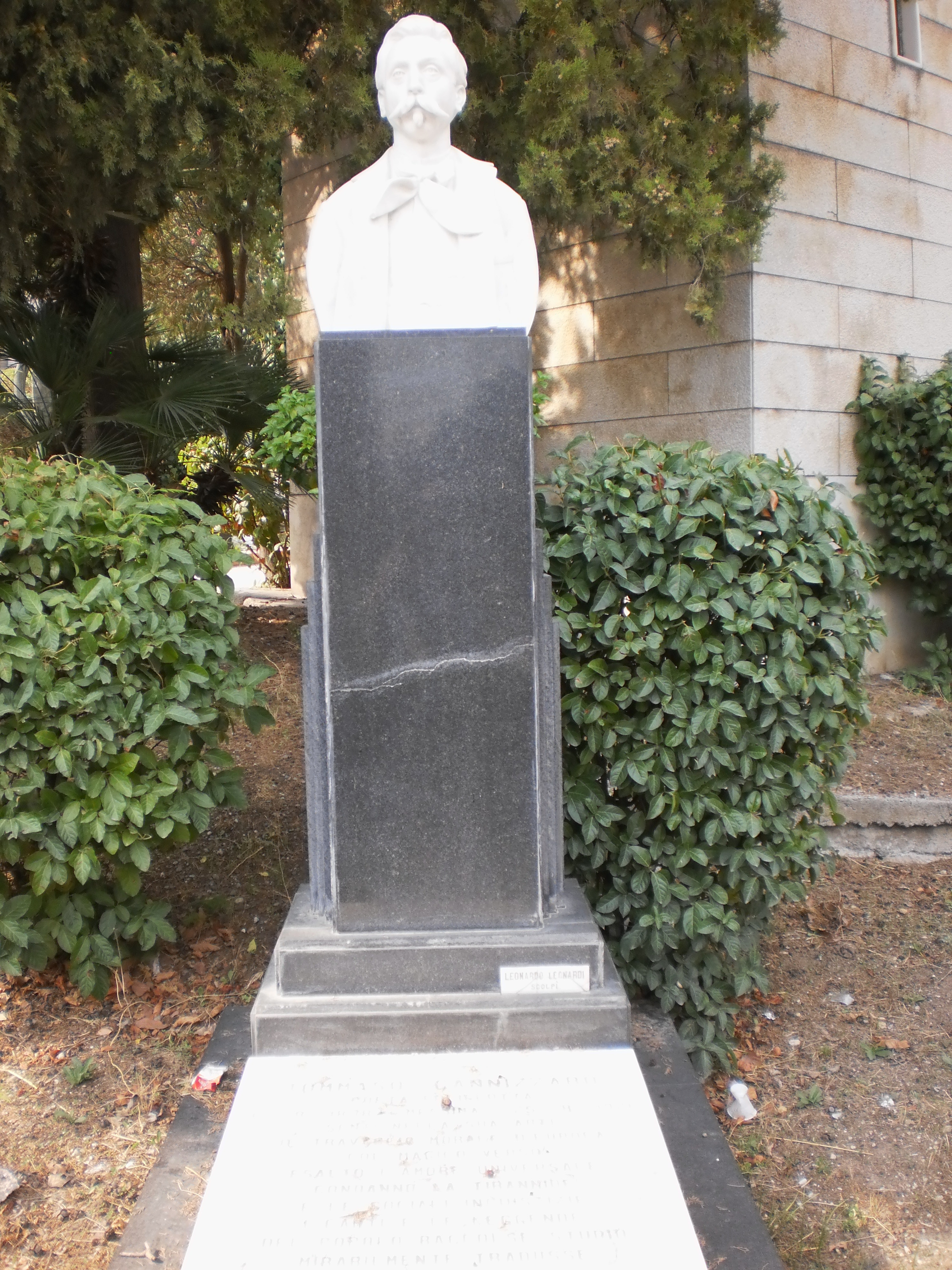
the grave of Tommaso Cannizzaro

- Jean Jacques Régis de Cambacérès
- Thomas Campbell (poet)
- Giovanni Canestrini
- Stanislao Cannizzaro
- Tommaso Cannizzaro ( see it:Tommaso Cannizzaro)
- Carlo Cantoni ( see it:Carlo Cantoni)
- Emily Palmer Cape ()
- Giosuè Carducci
- Richard Carlile
- Henry Carlton (jurist) ()
- John Aitken Carlyle ()
- Thomas Carlyle
- Andrew Carnegie
- Bartolomäus von Carneri ()
- Lazare Hippolyte Carnot

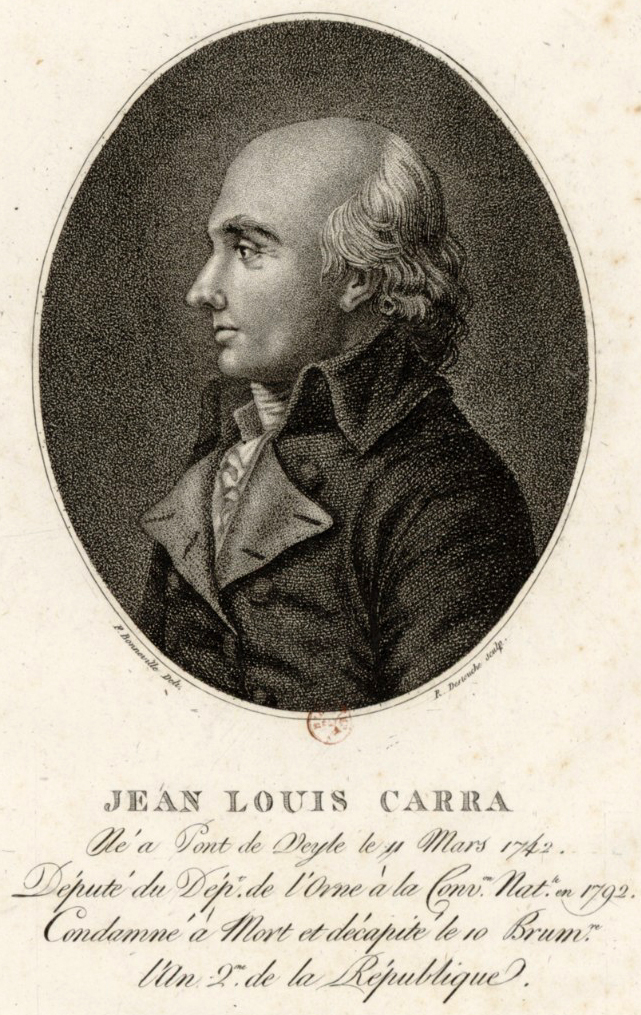
Jean-Louis Carra. Engraving by François Bonneville

- Lazare Nicolas Marguerite Carnot
- Marie François Sadi Carnot
- Nicolas Léonard Sadi Carnot
- Elme Marie Caro
- Queen Caroline
- Edward Carpenter
- William Benjamin Carpenter
- Herbert Wildon Carr

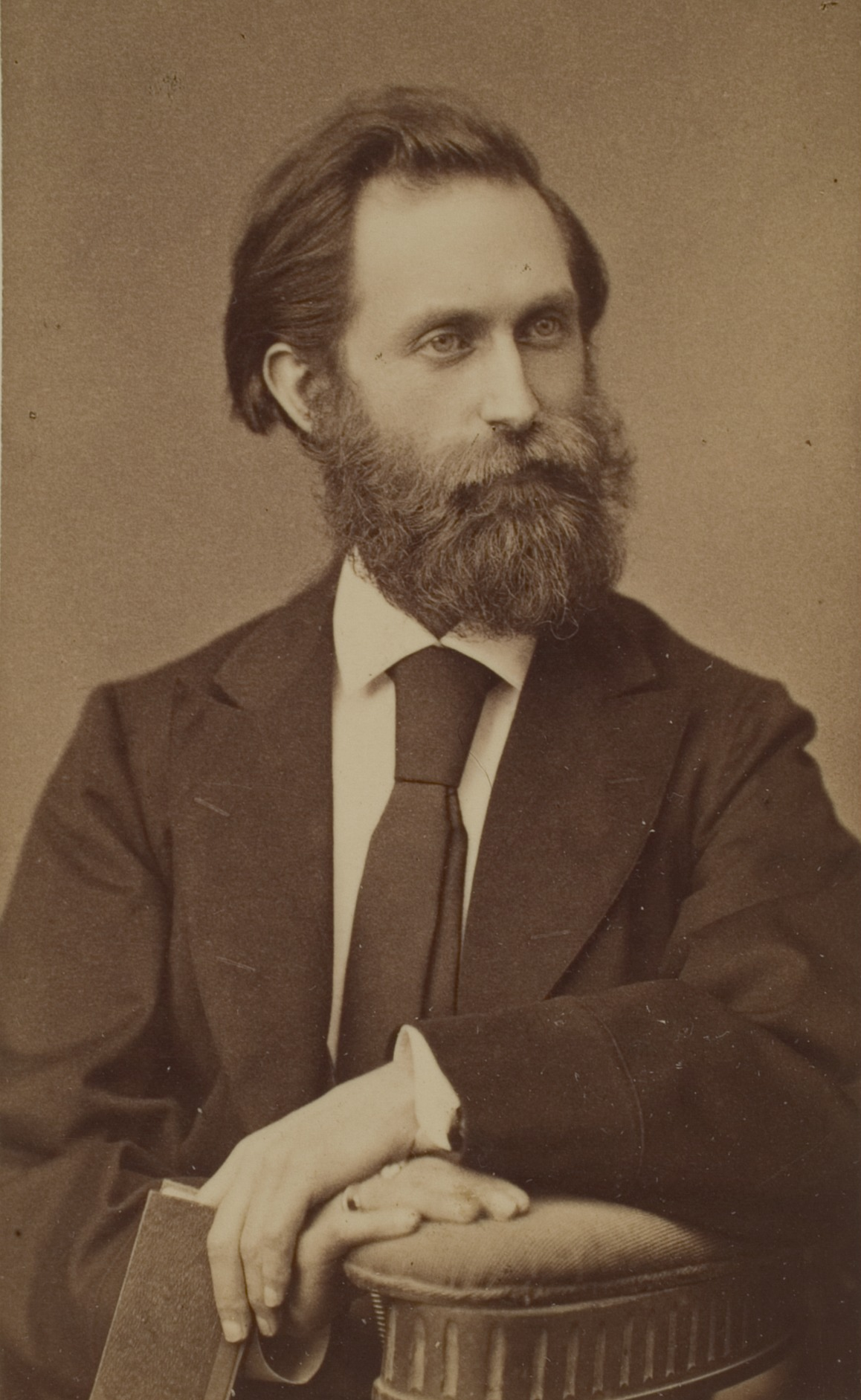
Otto Caspari

- Jean-Louis Carra ( see fr:Jean-Louis Carra)
- Jean Baptiste Nicholas Armand Carrel
- Moritz Carrière
- Julius Victor Carus
- Karl Gustav Carus
- Paul Carus
- Giovanni Jacques de Seingalt Casanova
- Jean Paul Pierre Casimir-Perier
- Otto Caspari ( see de:Otto Caspari)
- Walter Richard Cassels
- David Castelli

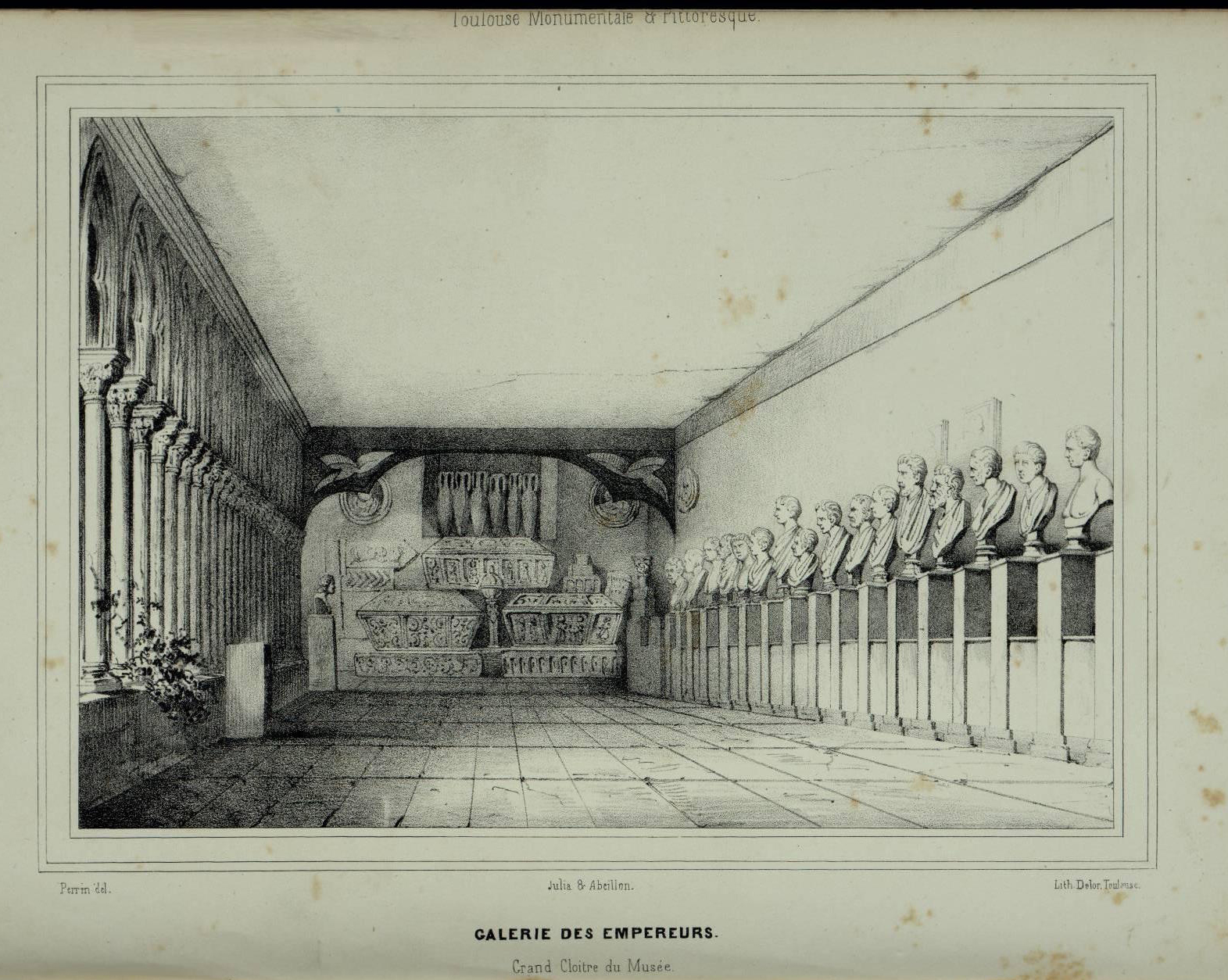
La Galerie des Empereurs in the Musée Saint-Raymond, Toulouse. From Toulouse monumentale et pittoresque by fr:Jean-Mamert Cayla

- Jean-Louis Castilhon
- Catherine the Great
- Carlo Cattaneo
- Giacomo Cattaneo ()
- Charles Cattell ()
- Éléonore-Louis Godefroi Cavaignac
- Felice Carlo Emmanuele Cavallotti
- Henry Cavendish
- Jean-Mamert Cayla () see fr:Jean-Mamert Cayla)
- Émile-Honoré Cazelles ( see s:fr:Auteur:Émile Cazelles)

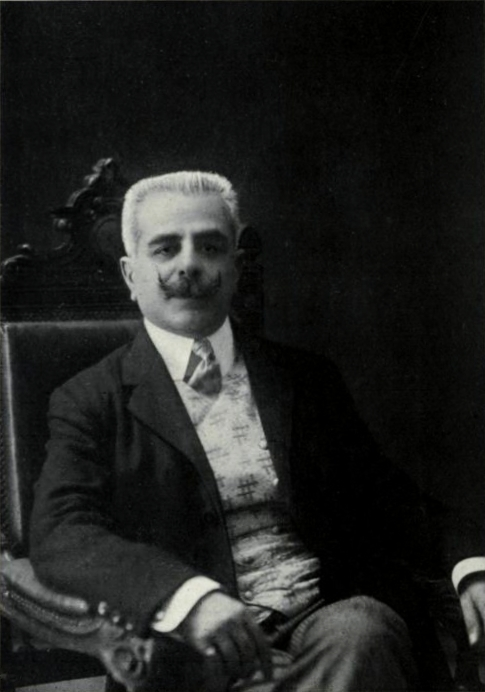
Giovanni Alfredo Cesareo

=== Ce ===
- Joseph Antoine Joachim Cerutti
- Giovanni Alfredo Cesareo ( see it:Giovanni Alfredo Cesareo)
- Paul-Armand Challemel-Lacour
- Thomas Chaloner (regicide)
- Basil Hall Chamberlain
- Daniel Henry Chamberlain
- Houston Stewart Chamberlain
- Ephraim Chambers
- Robert Chambers (publisher, born 1802)
- Sebastien-Roch Nicolas Chamfort
- Adelbert von Chamisso
- Jean-François Champollion
- Francis Leggatt Chantrey
- John Chapman (publisher)
- Jean Antoine Claude Chaptal
- Victor Charbonnel ( but :fr:Victor Charbonnel has incoming links)
- Antoine Charma ( see fr:Antoine Charma)
- Pierre Charron
- François-Jean de Chastellux
- Gabrielle Émilie du Châtelet
- Thomas Chatterton
- Pierre Gaspard Chaumette
- Pierre-Jean-Baptiste Chaussard
- Anton Pavlovich Chekhov
- André Marie Chénier
- Marie-Joseph Chénier
- Alice Chenoweth
- Charles Victor Cherbuliez
- Maria Luigi Carlo Zenobio Salvatore Cherubini
- Ramón Chíes y Gómez de Riofranco
- Lydia Maria Francis Child
- William Chilton (printer)
- Percival Chubb ()
- Thomas Chubb
- Jules Arsène Arnaud Claretie
- Marcus Andrew Hislop Clarke
- Georges Eugène Benjamin Clemenceau
- Samuel Langhorne Clemens
- Martin Clifford
- William Kingdon Clifford
- Mrs. W. K. Clifford
- Henry Cline
- Edward Clodd
- Jean-Baptiste du Val-de-Grâce, baron de Cloots
- Arthur Hugh Clough
- Thomas Clouston

=== Co ===
- Chapman Cohen
- Hermann Cohen
- Stanton Coit
- Henry John Coke ()
- John Duke Coleridge
- Jean Guillaume César Alexandre Hippolyte, baron de Colins ( see fr:Jean Hippolyte Colins de Ham)
- John Collier (painter)
- Christen Christian Dreyer Collin
- Anthony Collins
- John Churton Collins
- Lucy N. Colman
- Giovanni Battista Comazzi ( but we have lots of fleurons from his book. Cf. Henry Coventry (deist))
- Andrew Combe
- George Combe
- Émile Justin Louis Combes
- Thomas Common
- Domenico Comparetti
- Jules Gabriel Compayré
- François-Charles-Louis Comte
- Isidore Marie Auguste François Xavier Comte
- Étienne Bonnot de Mably de Condillac
- Marie Jean Antoine Nicolas de Caritat, Marquis of Condorcet
- Marie Louise Sophie Grouchy, Marquise of Condorcet
- Richard Congreve
- Joseph Conrad
- Henri-Benjamin Constant de Rebecque
- Vasile Conta (Basil Conta)
- Hugh Conway
- Moncure Daniel Conway
- William Martin Conway
- Frederick Cornwallis Conybeare
- Keningale Robert Cook ( now only remembered as the husband of Mabel Collins)
- Anthony Ashley Cooper, 1st Earl of Shaftesbury
- Anthony Ashley-Cooper, 3rd Earl of Shaftesbury
- John Gilbert Cooper
- Robert Cooper (Owenite) ()
- Thomas Cooper
- Edward Drinker Cope
- Henri Arthur Marie Cornette ()
- Otto Julius Bernhard von Corvin-Wiersbitzki
- Henry John Stedman Cotton
- Paul Louis Courier ~~de Méré~~
- Leonard Henry Courtney
- William Leonard Courtney
- Victor Cousin
- Henry Coventry (deist) ( but we have lots of fleurons from his book. Cf. Giovanni Battista Comazzi )
- William Coward
- Joseph Cowen

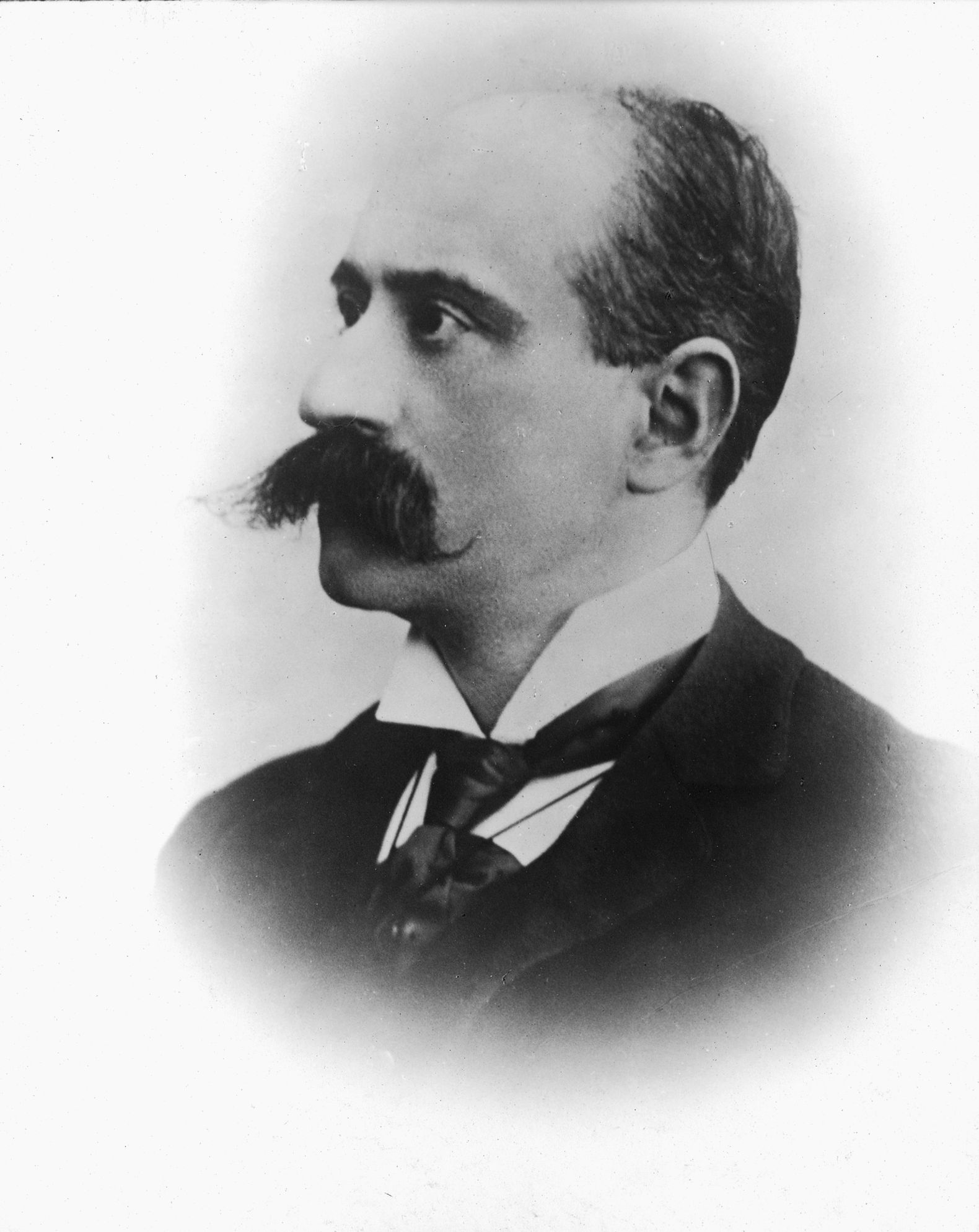
Vincenzo Crescini

- Johan Nikolai Cramer ()
- Christopher Pearse Cranch
- Walter Crane
- William Randal Cremer
- Vincenzo Crescini ( see it:Vincenzo Crescini)
- Benedetto Croce
- David Goodman Croly
- Henry Crompton ()
- Mary Ann Cross (George Eliot)
- John Beattie Crozier ()
- Franz-Valéry-Marie Cumont
- Heinrich Czolbe

== D ==
=== Da ===
- Étienne Noël Damilaville
- Jean Philibert Damiron
- Vincenzo Dandolo
- Agnes Mary Frances Darmesteter
- James Darmesteter
- Frances Darusmont
- Charles Darwin
- Erasmus Darwin
- Francis Darwin
- George Howard Darwin
- Leonard Darwin
- Alphonse Daudet
- Pierre Claude François Daunou
- Jacques-Louis David
- Caroline Augusta Rhys Davids
- Thomas William Rhys Davids
- John Davidson (poet)
- Thomas Davidson (philosopher)
- Charles Maurice Davies
- Helen Hamilton Gardner Day

=== De ===
- Élie Louis Marie Marc Antoine Debidour ( see fr:Antonin Debidour)
- Lauro Adolfo De Bosis
- Claude Achille Debussy
- Charles-Theodore-Henri De Coster
- Saverio Fausto De Dominicis ( see it:Saverio Fausto De Dominicis)
- Marie Anne de Vichy-Chamrond, marquise du Deffand
- Angelo de Gubernatis
- Edward Dowes Dekker (Multatuli)
- Ferdinand Victor Eugène Delacroix
- Marie Yves Delage
- Jean Baptiste Joseph Delambre
- Jean-François Casimir Delavigne
- Joseph Rémi Léopold Delbœuf
- Étienne Marie Justin Victor Delbos
- Léon Delbos ()
- Théophile Delcassé
- Jean-Baptiste-Claude Delisle de Sales

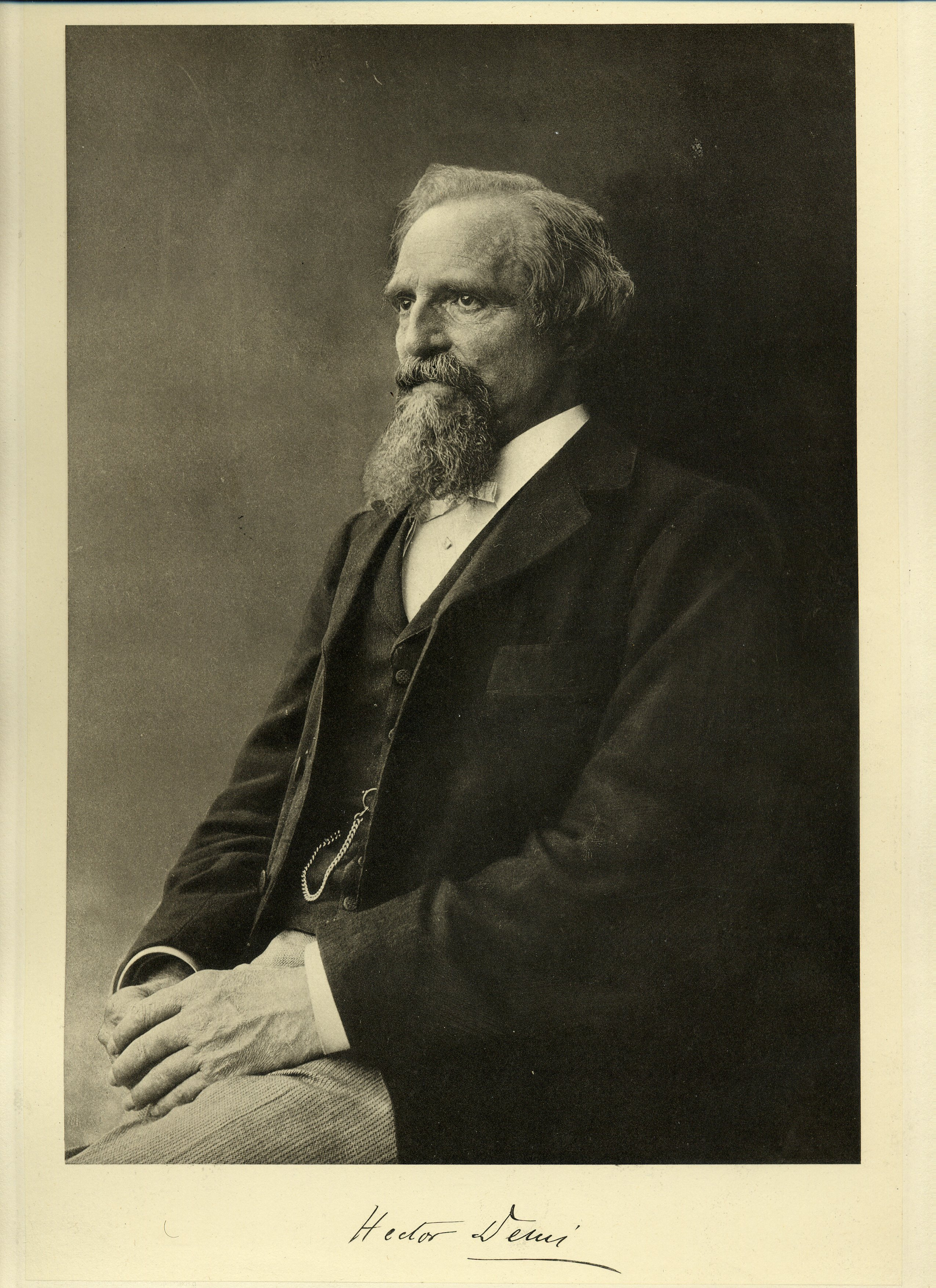
Hector Denis

- Alexandre Deleyre
- Augustus De Morgan
- Ève Demaillot ()
- James Steuart Denham
- Joseph Deniker
- Hector Denis
- William F. Denton ()
- César De Paepe
- Agathon Louis de Potter ()
- Louis Joseph Antoine de Potter
- Maria Deraismes
- Pasquale d'Ercole ()
- Francesco de Sanctis
- Léger Marie Deschamps
- Émile Auguste Étienne Martin Deschanel
- Paul Eugène Louis Deschanel
- Marius Deshumbert ()
- André-François Boureau-Deslandes
- Pierre Desmaizeaux
- Lucie Simplice Camille Benoît Desmoulins
- Gustave Le Brisoys Desnoiresterres ( see fr:Gustave Desnoiresterres
- Joseph Marie Dessaix

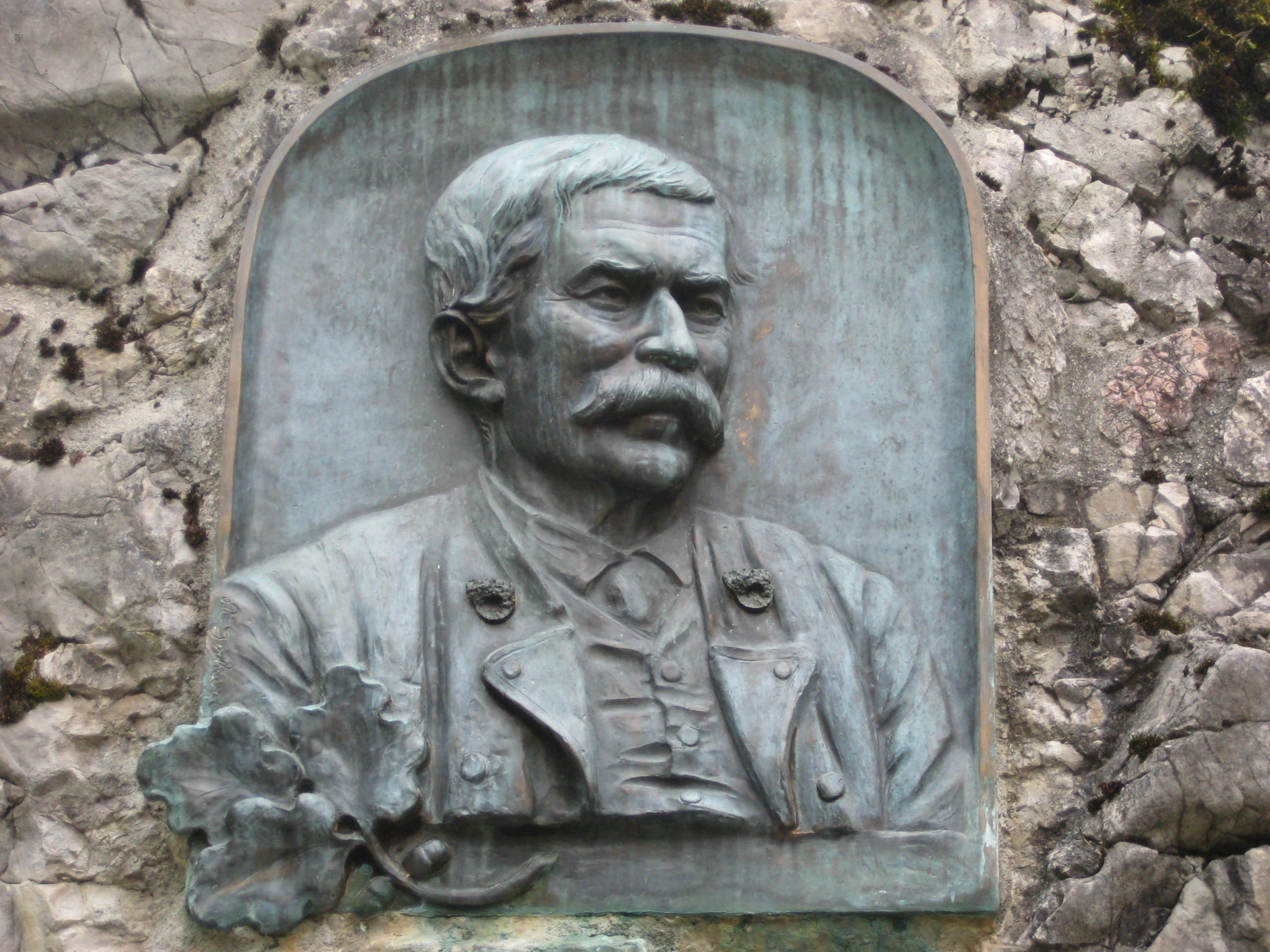
Konrad Deubler

- Pierre-Joseph Destriveaux ()
- Antoine Louis Claude Destutt de Tracy
- Rowland Detrosier
- Konrad Deubler ( see de:Konrad Deubler)
- Willem Deurhoff ()
- Immanuel Oscar Menahem Deutsch
- John Dewey
- Henry de Worms

=== Di ===
- Porfirio Díaz
- Goldsworthy Lowes Dickinson
- Auguste Dide ( see fr:Auguste Dide)
- Denis Diderot
- Gustav Diercks ()
- Joseph Dietzgen
- Ashton Wentworth Dilke
- Charles Wentworth Dilke
- Gustav Friedrich Dinter
- Johann Konrad Dippel
- Florence Caroline Dixie
- Bertram Dobell ()
- Johann Wolfgang Döbereiner
- Nikolay Alexandrovich Dobrolyubov
- Arnold Dodel-Port
- Henry Dodwell (deist) ( see s:Dodwell, Henry (d.1784) (DNB00))
- Horatio Bryan Donkin
- John Sholto Douglas
- Stephen Arnold Douglas
- Edward Dowden

=== Dr ===
- Jacques Philippe Raymond Draparnaud
- John William Draper
- Edmond Dresden ()
- Arthur Drews
- Hans Adolf Eduard Driesch
- William James Charles Maria Drummond of Logiealmond
- Helene von Druskowitz
- Charles Robert Drysdale
- John Dryden (merchant) ()

=== Du ===
- Julius Duboc
- Paul-François Dubois ( see fr:Paul-François Dubois)
- Emil du Bois-Reymond
- Pierre-Ulric Dubuisson
- Agnes Mary Frances Duclaux
- Charles Pinot Duclos

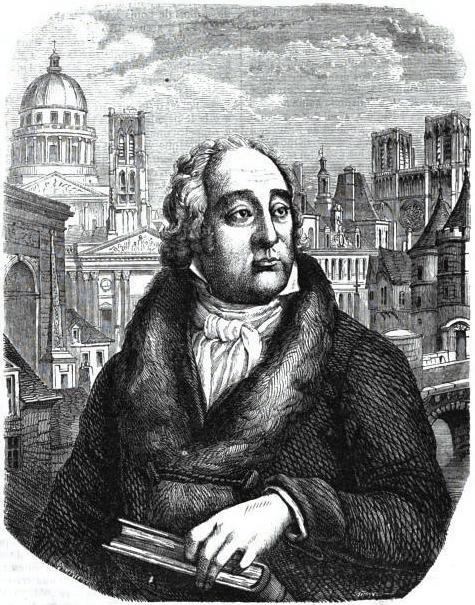
Jacques-Antoine Dulaure

- Jean-François Ducos
- William Dudgeon (philosopher)
- Eugen Karl Dühring
- Édouard Dujardin
- Jacques-Antoine Dulaure ( see fr:Jacques-Antoine Dulaure)
- Henri Joseph Du Laurens
- Albert Friedrich Benno Dulk ()
- Alexandre Dumas, fils
- George Louis Palmella Busson du Maurier
- Léon Dumont
- Pierre Étienne Louis Dumont
- David Duncan (educationist) ( see his most well known work)
- Maximilian Wolfgang Duncker
- Jacob Louis Dupont ( see fr:Jacques Louis Dupont)
- Pierre Samuel du Pont de Nemours
- Charles-François Dupuis
- Émile Durkheim
- Jean Victor Duruy
- Théophile-Imarigeon Duvernet ()

== E ==
- Daniel Isaac Eaton

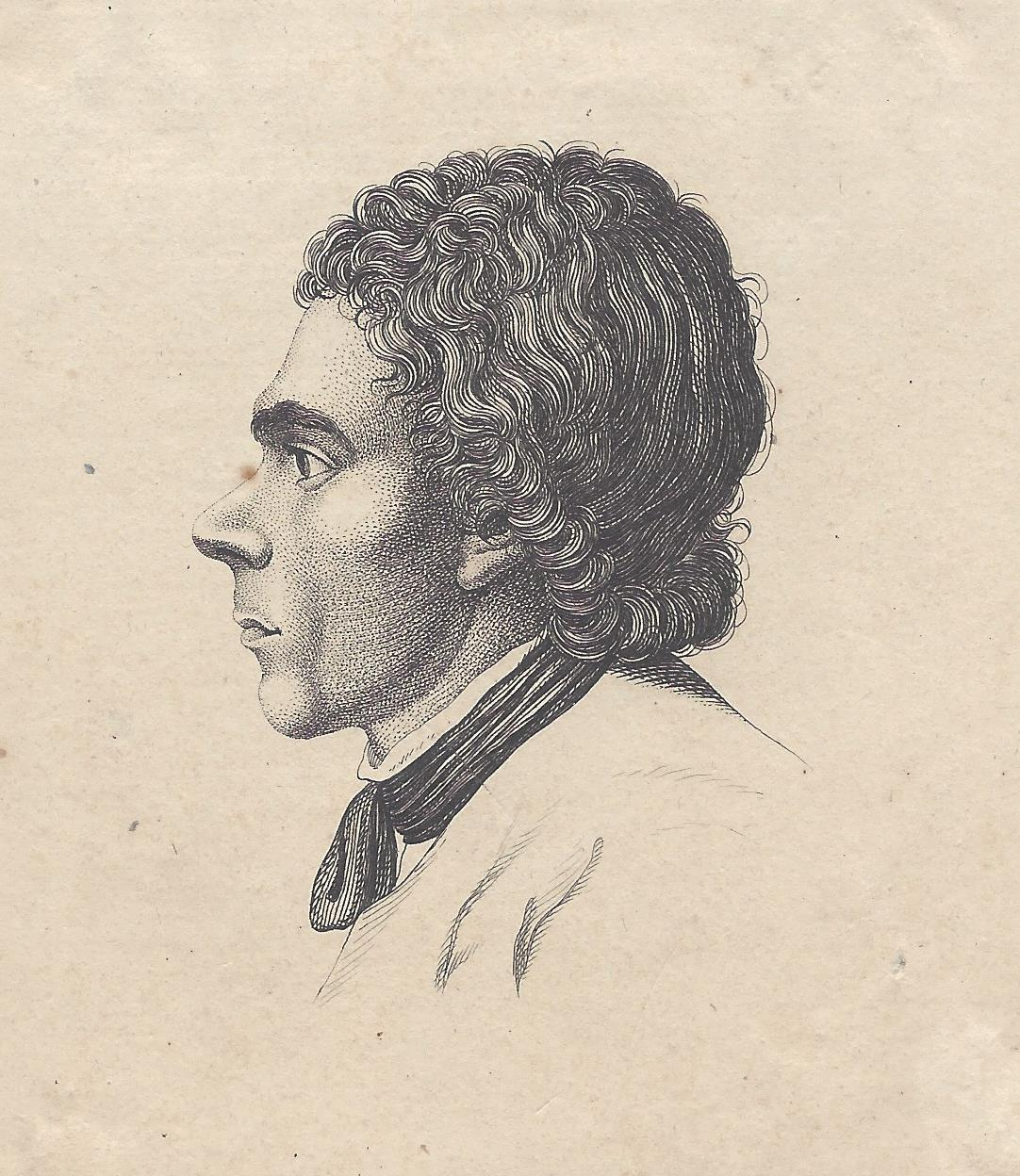
Johann Christian Edelmann

- Johann Augustus Eberhard
- Ernst Theodor Echtermeyer
- Johann Peter Eckermann
- Johann Christian Edelmann ( see de:Johann Christian Edelmann)
- Thomas Alva Edison
- Chilperic Edwards ()
- John Passmore Edwards
- Justus van Effen
- Johann Gottfried Eichhorn
- Rudolf Eisler
- Charles William Eliot
- George Eliot
- Pietro Ellero ( see it:Pietro Ellero)
- Hugh Samuel Roger Elliot
- John Elliotson
- Alfred Burdon Ellis
- Henry Havelock Ellis
- William Ellis
- Mountstuart Elphinstone
- Ralph Waldo Emerson
- William Emerson
- Robert Emmet
- Friedrich Engels
- George Bethune English
- George Ensor
- Johann Eduard Erdmann
- John Ericsson
- François-Louis d'Escherny ( see fr:François d'Escherny)
- Alfred Victor Espinas
- José de Espronceda
- Henri-François-Alphonse Esquiros
- George Henry Evans
- Mary Ann Evans (George Eliot)
- Antoine-François Ève ()
- Moses Jacob Ezekiel

== F ==
- Ferdinand Fabre
- Jean-Henri Fabre

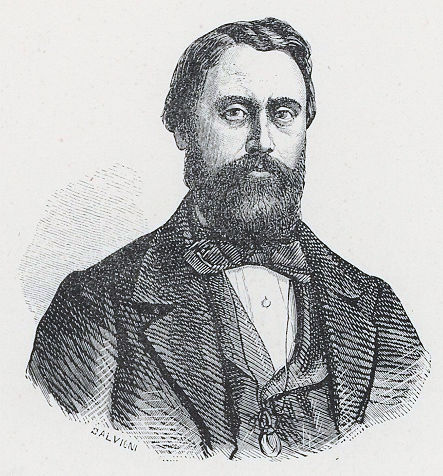
Bruto Fabricatore

- Philippe François Nazaire Fabre d'Églantine
- Bruto Fabricatore ( see it:Bruto Fabricatore)
- Adolfo Faggi ()
- Auguste Émile Faguet
- Clement Armand Fallières
- Frederick John Fargus
- John Farquhar
- Hippolyte Fauche ( see fr:Hippolyte Fauche)
- Félix François Faure
- Sébastien Faure
- Edgar Fawcett
- Henry Fawcett
- Everard Fawkener
- Gustav Theodor Fechner
- Robert Fellowes
- Joseph Fels
- Giuseppe Ferrari
- Francisco Ferrer y Guardia
- Guglielmo Ferrero
- Enrico Ferri
- Luigi Ferri
- Jules François Camille Ferry
- Friedrich Heinrich Feuerbach
- Ludwig Feuerbach
- Johann Gottlieb Fichte
- Harold Patrick Fielding-Hall ()
- Estanislao Figueras y de Moragas
- Gaetano Filangieri
- Heinrich Finke ( see de:Heinrich Finke)
- Francesco Fiorentino
- Johann Georg Fischer
- Ernst Kuno Berthold Fischer
- John Fiske
- Edward FitzGerald
- Nicolas Camille Flammarion
- "Flanor" (Carel Vosmaer)
- Gustave Flaubert
- Charles Thomas Floquet
- Gustave Flourens
- Marie Jean Pierre Flourens
- Benjamin Orange Flower
- Eliza Flower

=== Fo ===
- Wilhelm Julius Foerster
- Albany Fonblanque
- Theodor Fontane
- Bernard Le Bovier de Fontenelle
- George William Foote
- Friedrich Karl Forberg
- Auguste Forel
- James George Roche Forlong
- Karl Fortlage
- Niccolò Ugo Foscolo
- Alfred Jules Émile Fouillée
- Jean-Baptiste Joseph Fourier
- François Marie Charles Fourier
- Charles James Fox
- Elizabeth Vassall Fox
- Henry Fox, 1st Baron Holland

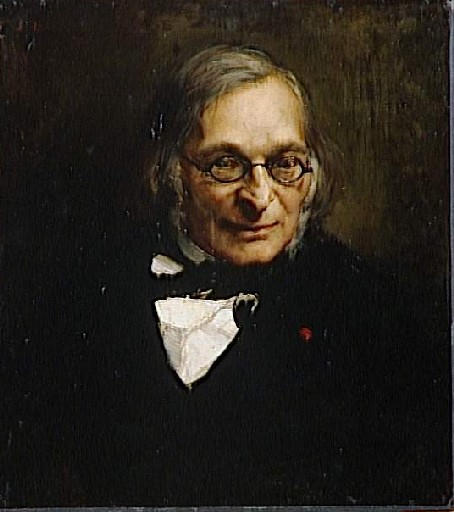
Adolphe Franck

- Henry Richard Vassall-Fox
- William Johnson Fox
- Anatole France
- Adolphe Franck
- Nicolas-Louis François de Neufchâteau
- Edward Frankland
- Benjamin Franklin
- John Fransham
- Christian Martin Julius Frauenstädt
- James George Frazer
- Frederick II of Prussia
- William Freke
- Ferdinand Freiligrath
- William Frend (reformer)
- Hubert Joseph Walthère Frère-Orban
- Nicolas Fréret
- Charles Louis de Saulces de Freycinet
- Gustav Freytag
- Jakob Friedrich Fries
- Friedrich Fröbel
- Octavius Brooks Frothingham
- James Anthony Froude
- John Fry (regicide)
- Sarah Margaret Fuller Ossoli
- Max Fürbringer
- Frederick James Furnivall

== G ==
=== Ga ===
- Hans Friedrich Gadow
- Matilda Joslyn Gage
- Henri Gaidoz
- Benito Pérez Galdós
- Ferdinando Galiani
- Franz Joseph Gall

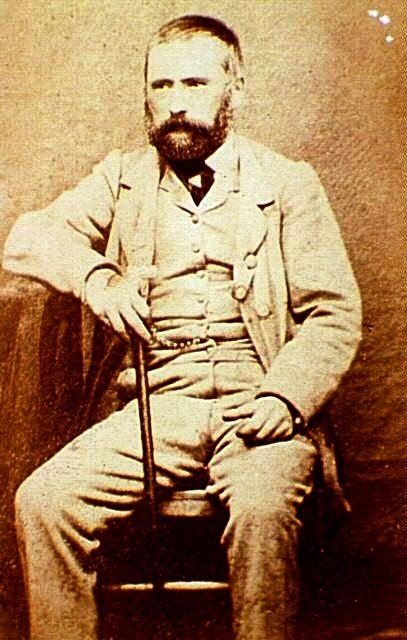
Charles Ferdinand Gambon

- Abraham Alfonse Albert Gallatin

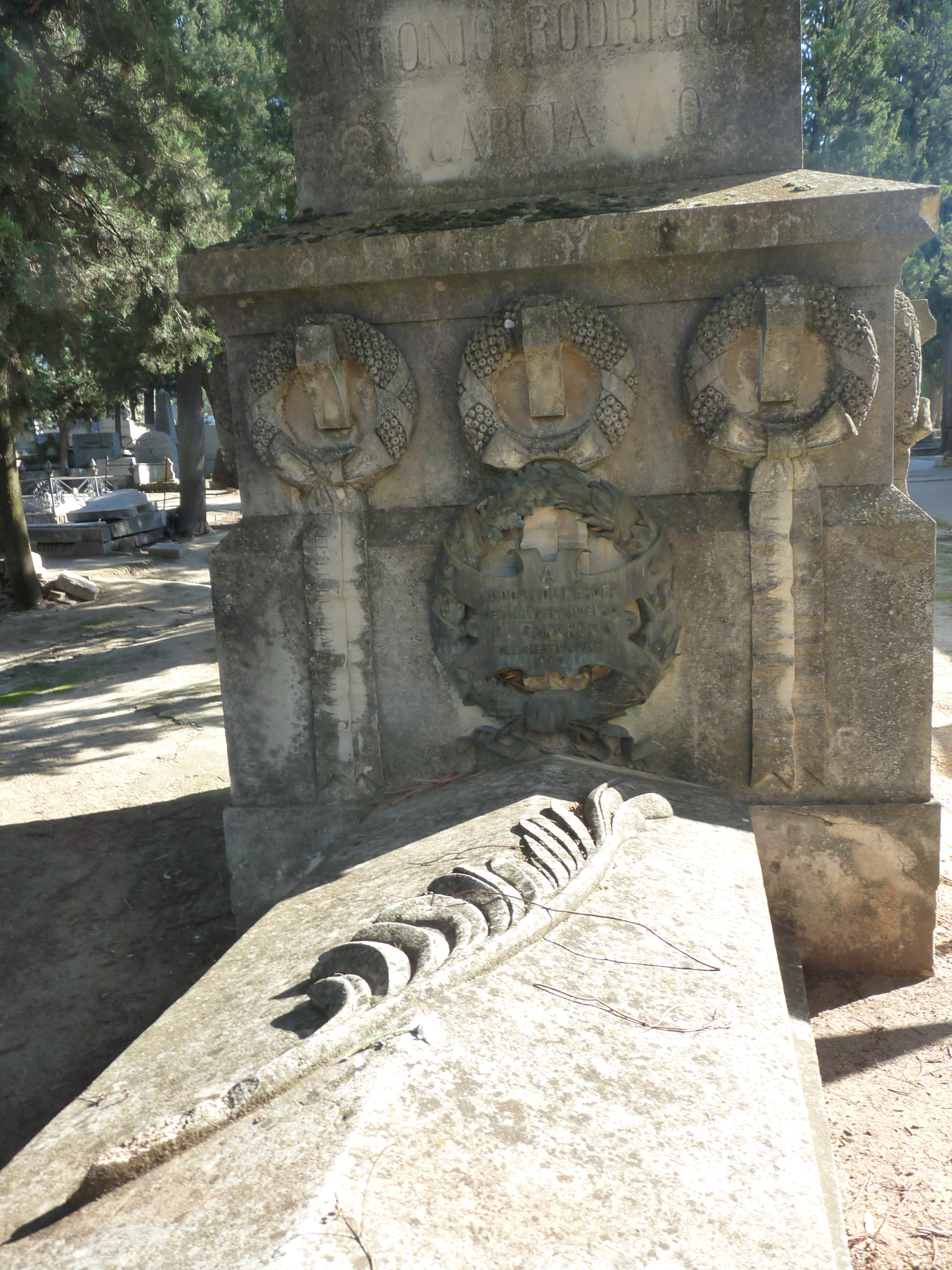
The tomb of Antonio Rodríguez García-Vao

- Walter Matthew Gallichan
- John Galsworthy
- Francis Galton
- Léon Michel Gambetta
- Charles Ferdinand Gambon ( see fr:Charles Ferdinand Gambon)
- Antonio Rodríguez García-Vao ( see es:Antonio Rodríguez García-Vao)
- Helen Hamilton Gardener
- Giuseppe Garibaldi
- Edward William Garnett
- Lucy Mary Jane Garnett
- Richard Garnett (writer)
- William Lloyd Garrison
- Samuel Garth
- Pierre Jules Théophile Gautier
- Joseph Louis Gay-Lussac
- Erik Gustaf Geijer
- Barbe Gendre ()
- Petrus Augustus de Génestet
- François Génin ()
- Antonio Genovesi
- Marie Thérèse Rodet Geoffrin
- Étienne Geoffroy Saint-Hilaire
- Isidore Geoffroy Saint-Hilaire
- Friedrich Wilhelm Ghillany
- Arcangelo Ghisleri
- Pietro Giannone
- Edward Gibbon
- Franklin Henry Giddings
- Adam Gifford
- Charlotte Perkins Gilman
- Ernest William Gimson
- Josiah Gimson ()
- Sydney Ansell Gimson ()
- Pierre-Louis Ginguené
- Melchiorre Gioia
- Stephen Girard
- Maria Gisborne
- George Robert Gissing
- Georg von Gizycki ( see de:Georg von Gizycki)
- John Stuart Stuart-Glennie
- Francis Glisson
- Joseph Arthur de Gobineau
- René Goblet
- Eugène Goblet d'Alviella
- W. S. Godfrey ()
- Edwin Lawrence Godkin
- Mary Wollstonecraft
- William Godwin
- Johann Wolfgang von Goethe
- John Goldie (philosopher)
- Theodor Goldstücker
- Ignác Goldziher
- George Laurence Gomme

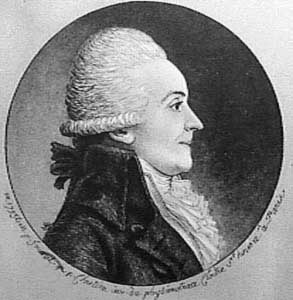
Giuseppe Gorani

- Heinrich Gomperz
- Theodor Gomperz
- Edmond Louis Antoine Huot de Goncourt
- Jules Alfred Huot de Goncourt
- Giuseppe Gorani ( see it:Giuseppe Gorani)
- Adam Lindsay Gordon
- Thomas Gordon (writer)
- Charles Turner Gorham ()
- Alexei Maximovitch Peshkov Gorky
- Frederick James Gould
- Remy de Gourmont

=== Gr ===
- William Graham (economist) ()
- Kerr Grant
- Ulysses Simpson Grant
- Mountstuart Elphinstone Grant Duff
- Benjamin Kirkman Gray
- Octave Vallery Clément Gréard
- John Richard Green
- Joseph Frederick Green

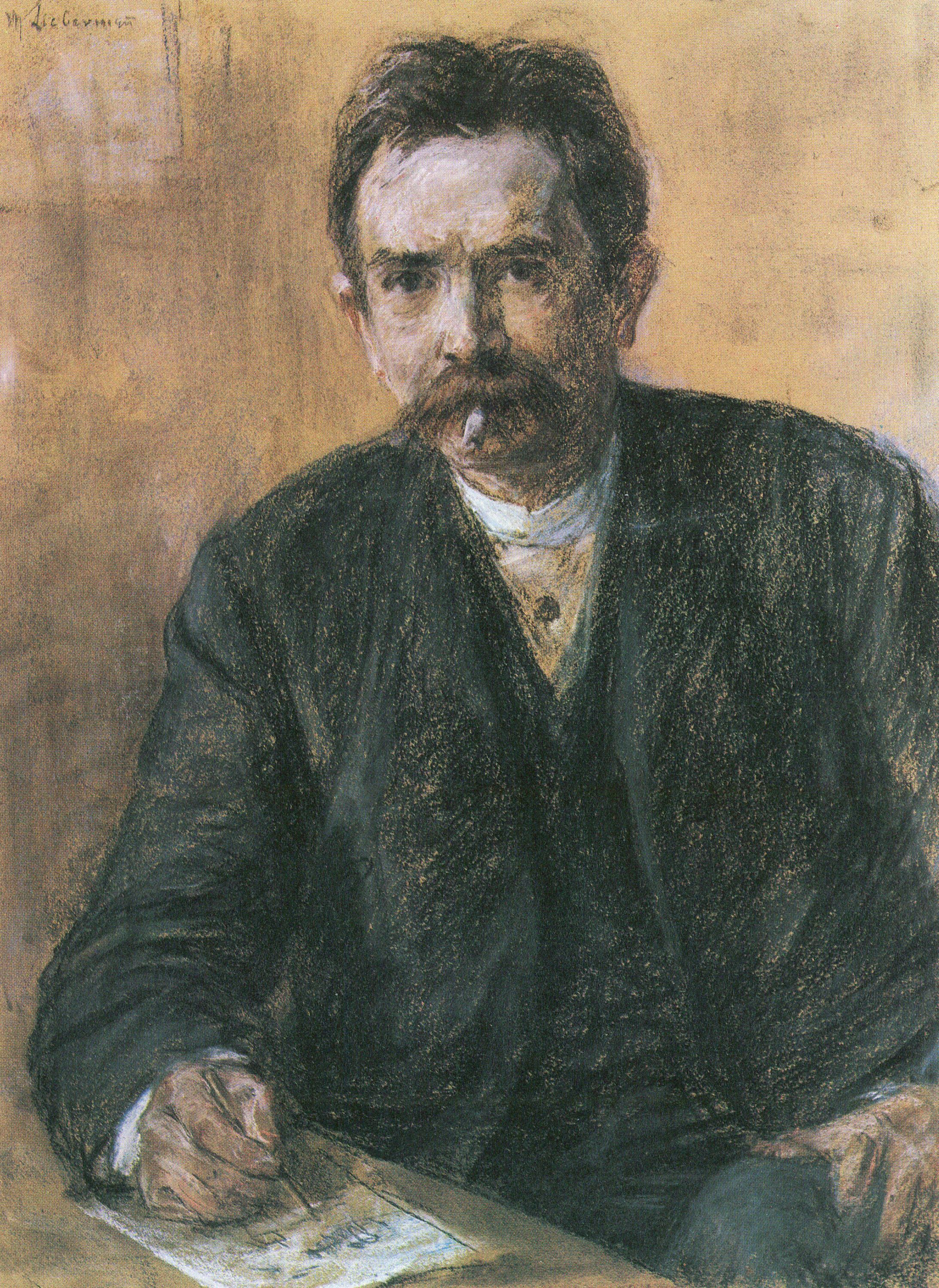
Eduard Grisebach

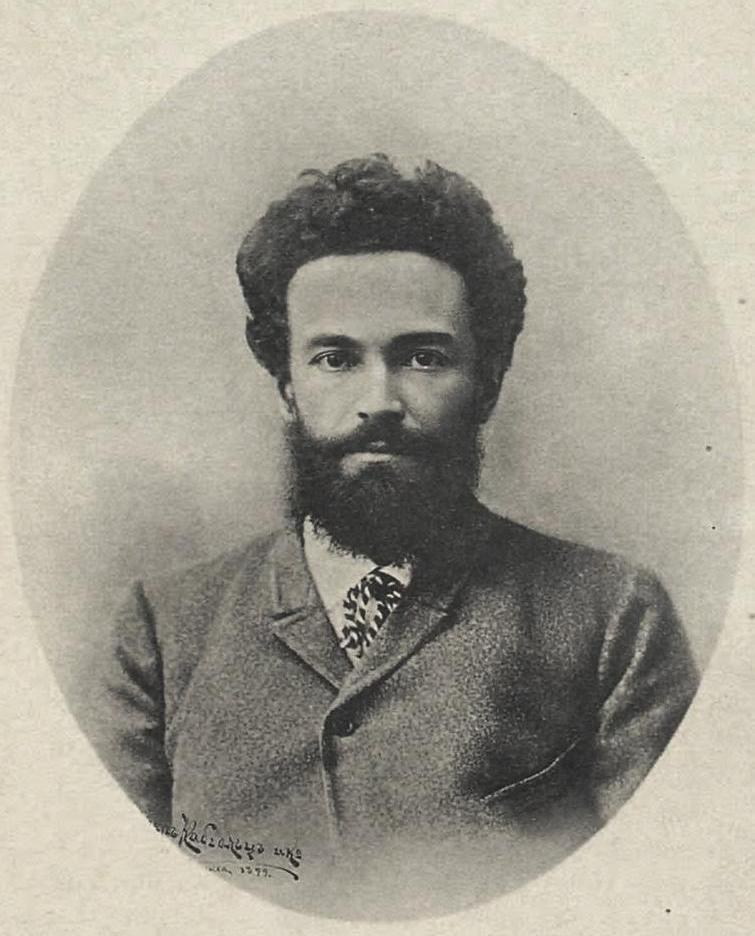
Nikolai Yakolevich Grot

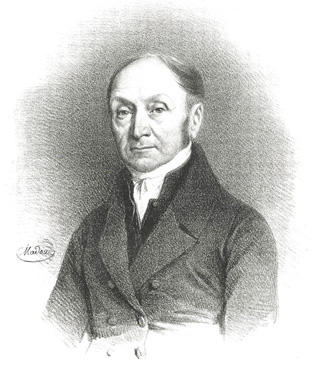
Louis Gruyer

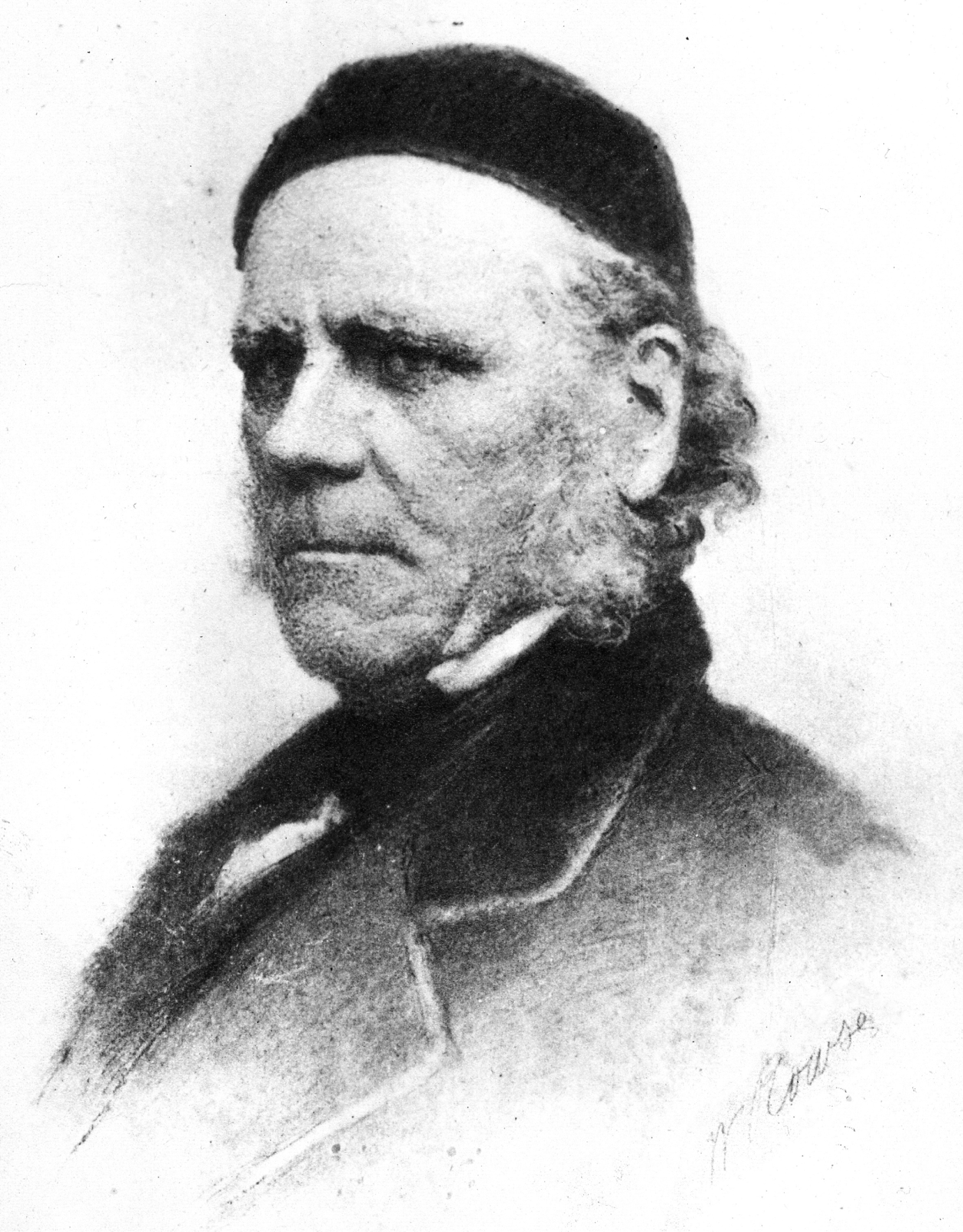
Ange Guépin

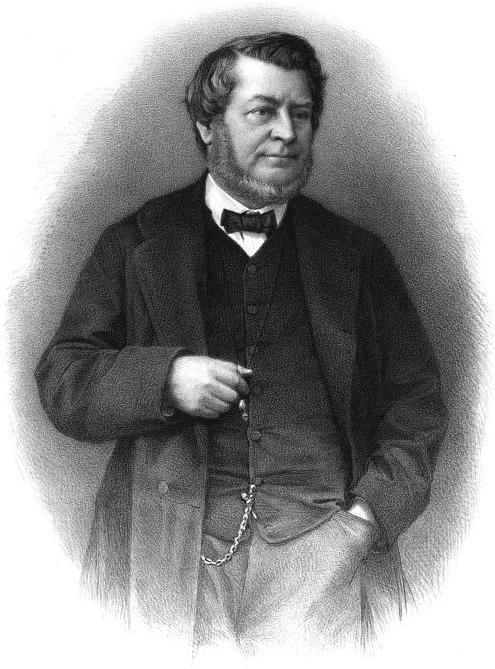
Adolphe Georges Guéroult

- Kate Greenaway
- Edward Greenly
- Granville George Greenwood
- William Rathbone Greg
- Ferdinand Gregorovius
- William Henry Gregory
- Charles Cavendish Fulke Greville
- François Paul Jules Grévy
- Albert Henry George Grey
- Lepel Henry Griffin
- Dod Grile
- Franz Grillparzer
- Friedrich Melchior von Grimm
- Eduard Grisebach ( see de:Eduard Grisebach)
- Francis Hindes Groome
- Karl Groos
- Alessandro Groppali ()
- Elici Gropuel (appears in A Biographical Dictionary of Ancient, Medieval and Modern Freethinkers)
- Nikolai Yakolevich Grot ( see ru:Грот, Николай Яковлевич)
- George Grote
- Harriet Grote
- Karl Theodor Ferdinand Grün
- Louis Auguste Jean François Philippe Gruyer ( see fr:Louis Gruyer)
- Ange Guépin ( see fr:Ange Guépin)
- Adolphe Georges Guéroult ( see fr:Adolphe Georges Guéroult)
- Abílio Manuel Guerra Junqueiro
- Olindo Guerrini

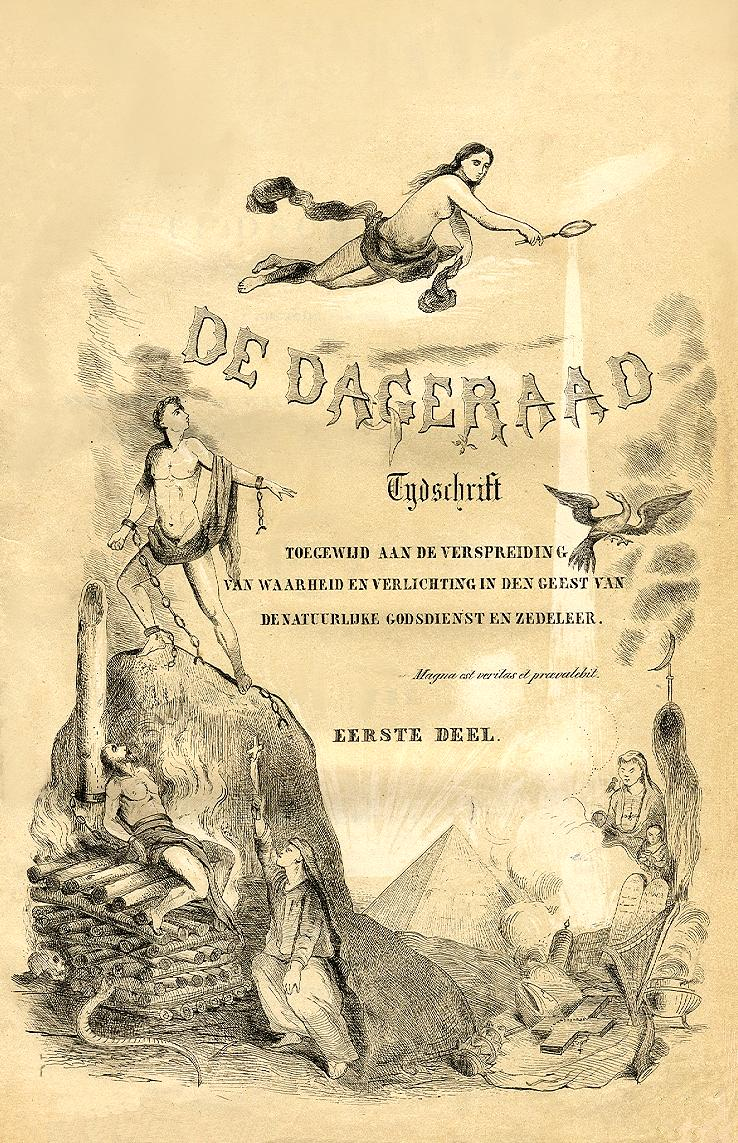
Cover of the first edition of De Dageraad of which Frans Christiaan Günst was a writer

- Jules Basile Guesde
- Nicolas Gueudeville ( see fr:Nicolas Gueudeville)
- Louisa Sarah Bevington Guggenberger
- Émile Étienne Guimet
- William Withey Gull
- Ludwig Gumplowicz
- Nicolaus Hieronymus Gundling
- Frans Christiaan Günst ()
- Edmund Gurney
- Jean-Marie Guyau
- Yves Guyot
- Gustaf Fredrik Gyllenborg

== J ==
- John Jacob
- Jens Peter Jacobsen
- Louis Jacolliot
- Henry James
- William James
- Leander Starr Jameson
- Joseph Jastrow
- Morris Jastrow, Jr.
- Louis de Jaucourt
- Jean Leon Jaurès
- Richard Jefferies

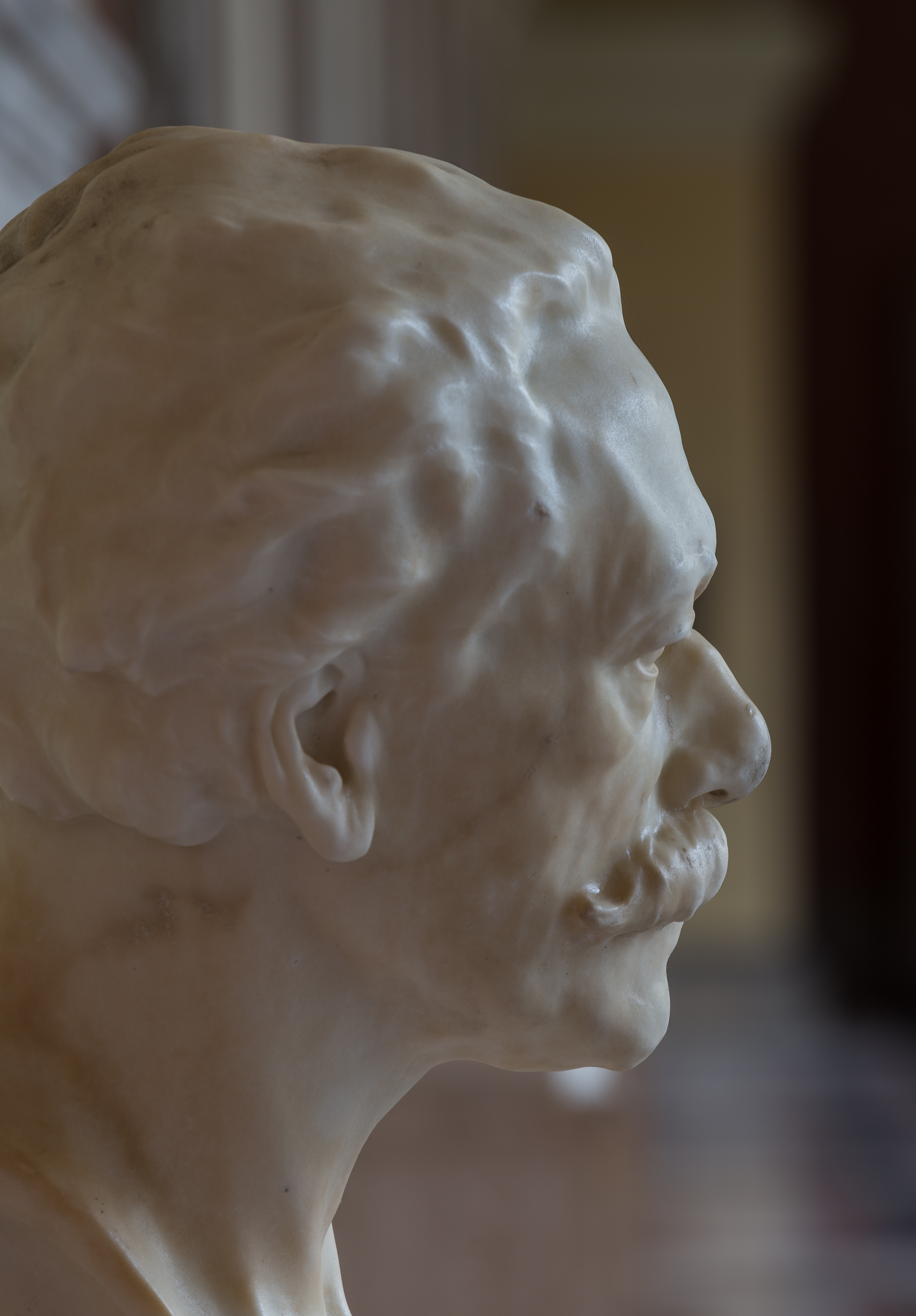
Büste von Friedrich Jodl im Arkadenhof der Universität Wien

- Thomas Jefferson
- Francis Jeffrey, Lord Jeffrey
- Peter Christian Albrecht Jensen ( see de:Peter Jensen (Altorientalist))
- Charles Jervas
- Friedrich Jodl
- Richard Mentor Johnson
- Samuel Johnson
- Harry Hamilton Johnston
- Ernest Jones
- David Starr Jordan
- Théodore Simon Jouffroy
- Benjamin Jowett
- Benito Pablo Juárez
- Mark Hayler Judge
- Franz Wilhelm Junghuhn

== K ==
- Alexander Kadison ()
- Marcus Kalisch
- Albert Kalthoff
- Henry Home, Lord Kames
- Immanuel Kant
- Otto Karmin ()
- Karl Johann Kautsky
- Augustus Henry Keane
- Charles Francis Keary ( several refs to him mainly in refs)
- John Keats
- Charles Samuel Keene
- George Keith, 10th Earl Marischal
- James Francis Edward Keith
- Johan Henric Kellgren
- William Kenrick
- Ellen Key
- Cassius Jackson Keyser
- Alexander Lange Kielland
- Søren Aaby Kierkegaard
- Peter King, 1776–1833 ()
- Alexander William Kinglake
- George Henry Kingsley ( brother of Charles Kingsley)
- Mary Henrietta Kingsley
- Hermann Klaatsch
- Heinrich von Kleist
- Abner Kneeland
- Otto Knopf ( see the eponymous Knopfia asteroid)
- Robert Knox
- James Knowles
- Matthias Knutzen
- Hermann Kolbe
- Selig Korn ( see this)
- Ernst Ludwig Krause ()
- Karl Christian Friedrich Krause
- Franz Krejei ()
- Arnold Krekel
- Pyotr Kropotkin

== M ==
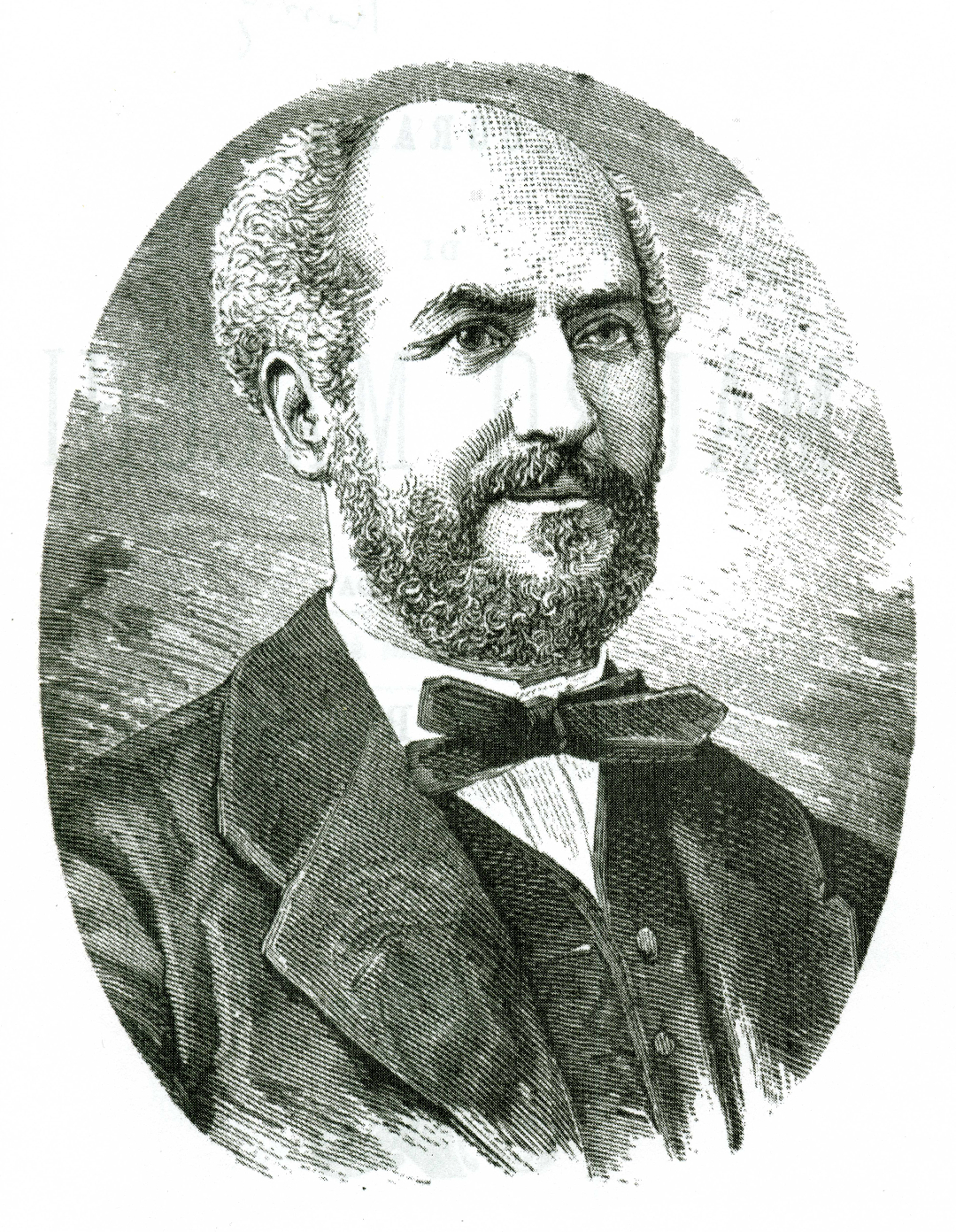
Mauro Macchi

=== Ma ===
- James Macartney (anatomist)
- Joseph McCabe
- William Maccall
- Mauro Macchi ( see it:Mauro Macchi)
- Eugene Montague Macdonald ()
- George Everett Macdonald ()
- Ernst Waldfried Josef Wenzel Mach
- Bernardino Machado
- Charles Mackay (author)
- Robert William Mackay ( see s:Mackay, Robert William (DNB00))
- John Stuart Mackenzie
- Sampson Arnold Mackey ()
- James Mackintosh
- John M'Taggart Ellis M'Taggart
- Imre Madách
- James Madison
- Johann Heinrich von Mädler
- Maurice Polydore Marie Bernard Maeterlinck
- Jean Hyacinthe de Magellan
- Frederic William Maitland
- Arthur François Ève Maillot
- François de Malherbe
- David Mallet (writer)
- Benoît Malon
- Hector Henri Malot
- Conrad Malte-Brun
- Terenzio Mamiani della Royere
- Bernard Mandeville
- Willem Christiaan van Manen
- Mangasar Mugurditch Mangasarian ()
- Paolo Mantegazza
- Jean-Paul Marat
- José Marchena Ruiz de Cueto
- Giovanni Marchesini ( but it:Giovanni Marchesini is a different professor at the University of Padua!)

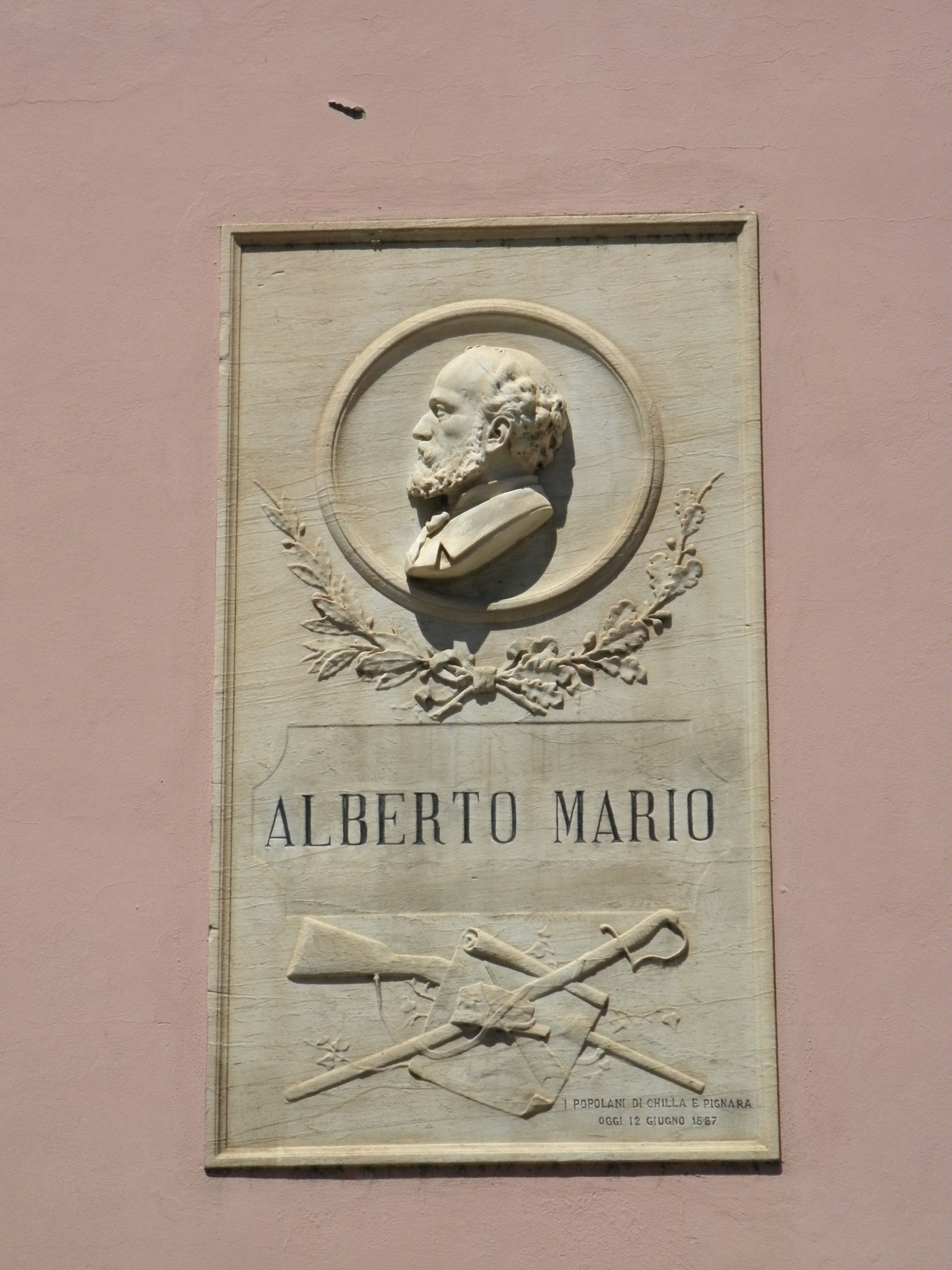
Plaque to Alberto Mario in Adria

- Pierre Sylvain Maréchal
- Robert Ranulph Marett
- Victor Margueritte
- François Auguste Ferdinand Mariette
- Léon Marillier ( see fr:Léon Marillier)
- Alberto Mario ( see it:Alberto Mario)
- Jessie White Mario
- Edward Laurens Mark ()
- Erich Marcks (
- Murray Marks (
- Christopher Marlowe
- Jean-François Marmontel
- Thomas Marryat
- Henry Rutgers Marshall
- Philip Bourke Marston

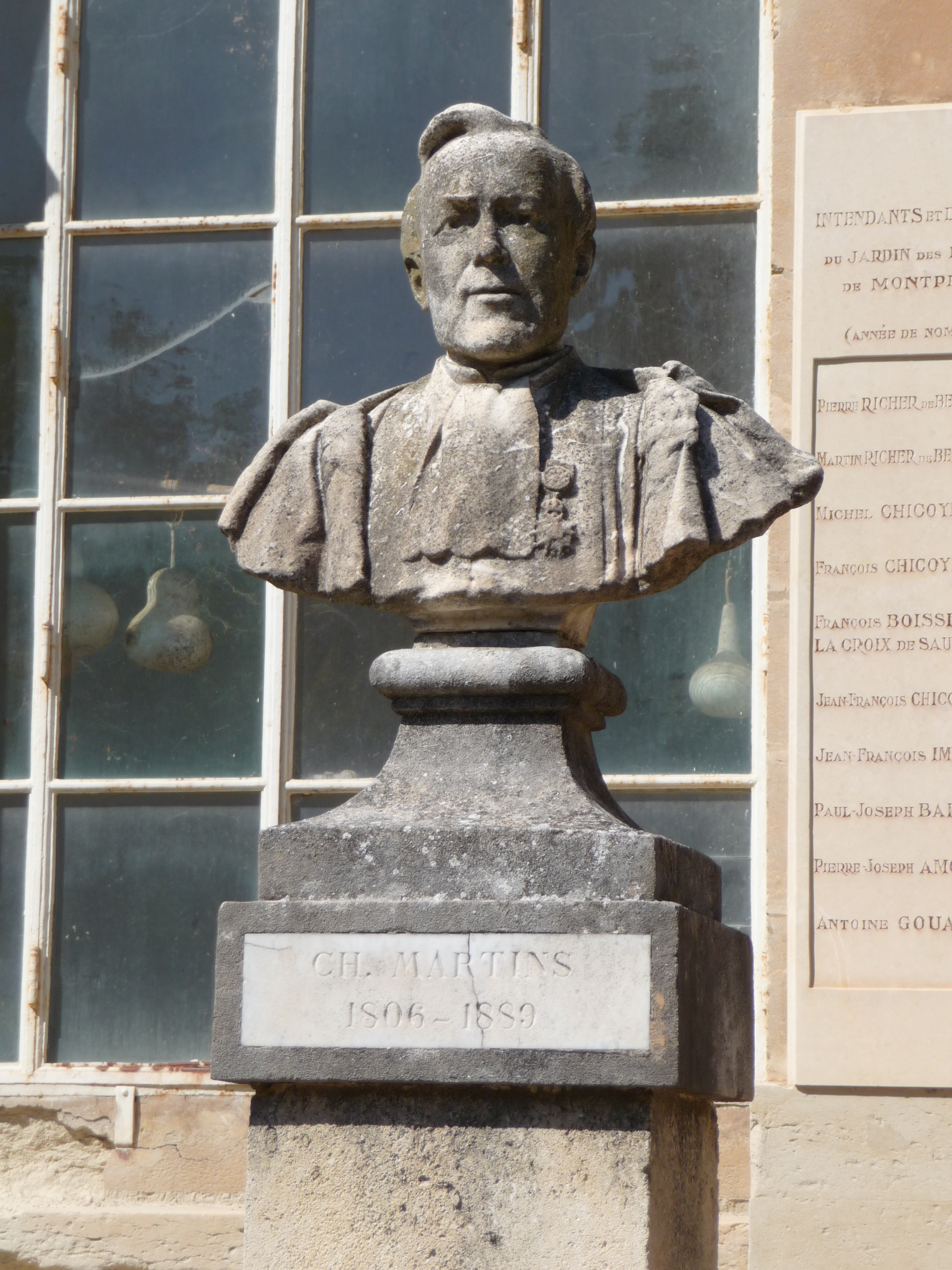
Charles Frédéric Martins

- François-Marie de Marsy ( fr:François-Marie de Marsy)
- Henry Marten (regicide)
- Alfred Wilhelm Martin
- Bon Louis Henri Martin

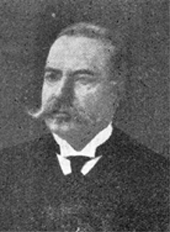
Filippo Masci

- Emma Martin (socialist)
- Harriet Martineau
- Charles Frédéric Martins see fr:Charles Frédéric Martins)
- Francis Sidney Marvin
- Karl Marx
- Tomáš Garrigue Masaryk
- Pietro Antonio Stefano Mascagni

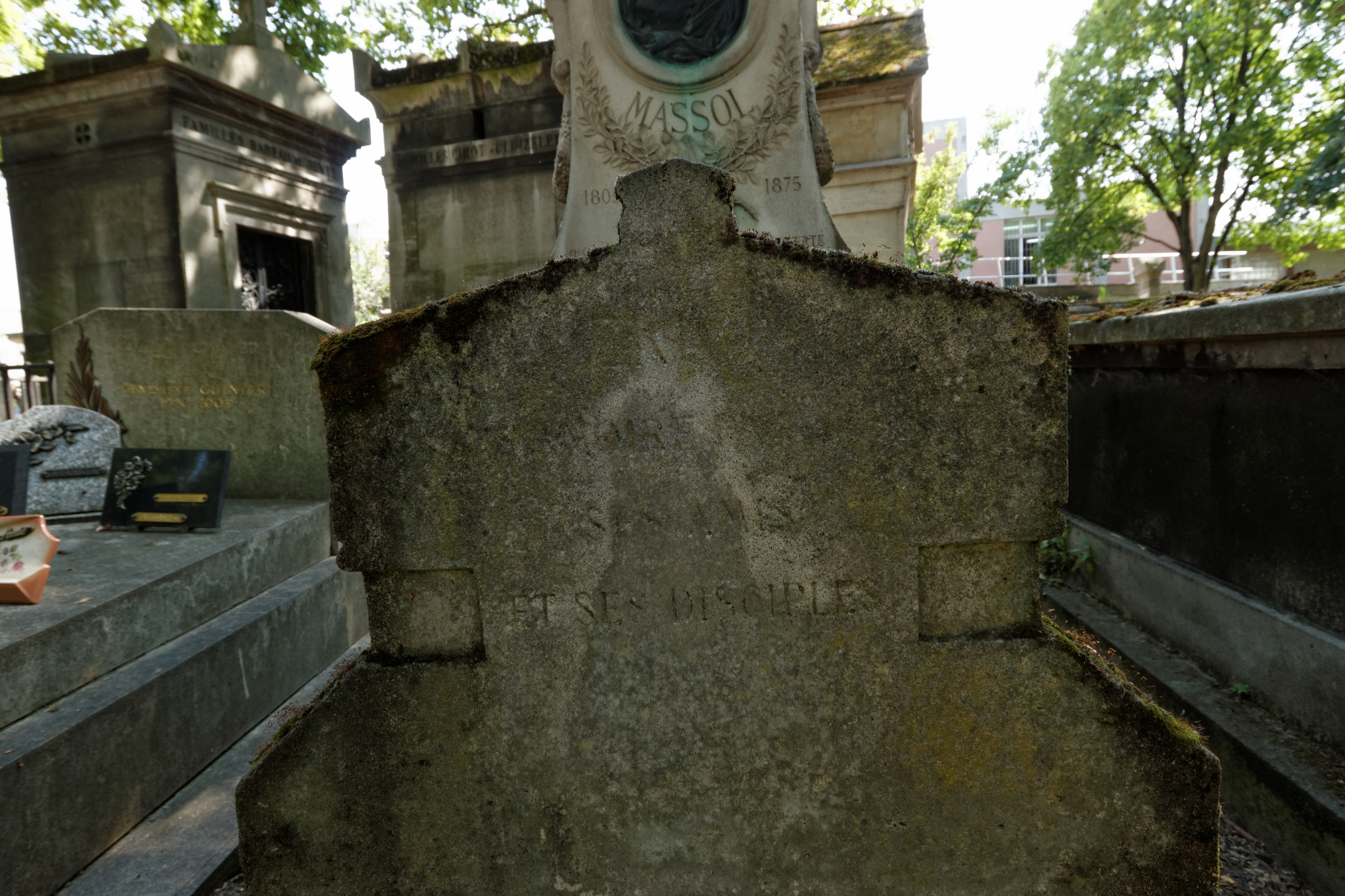
The tomb of Marie-Alexandre Massol in Cimetière du Père-Lachaise, Paris

- Filippo Masci ( see it:Filippo Masci)
- Josiah Mason
- Jules Émile Frédéric Massenet
- Gerald Massey
- Marie-Alexandre Massol ( see s:fr:La Sculpture dans les cimetières de Paris/Père-Lachaise/75)
- Jean-Henri Maubert de Gouvest ( see fr:Jean-Henri Maubert de Gouvest)
- Aylmer Maude
- Henry Maudsley
- Henri René Albert Guy de Maupassant
- Pierre Louis Moreau de Maupertuis
- Jakob Mauvillon
- Hiram Stevens Maxim
- Friedrich Max Müller
- Frederick Augustus Maxse
- Walther Victor May ()
- Giuseppe Mazzini

=== Me ===
- Thomas Medwin
- Alfred Meissner
- Jean Henri Meister ()
- William Lamb, 2nd Viscount Melbourne
- Félix Jules Méline
- Herman Melville
- Louis-Nicolas Ménard
- Moses Mendelssohn
- Catulle Mendès
- Juan Álvarez Mendizábal
- Ernest Mendum ()
- Josiah P. Mendum ()
- Edme Mentelle
- Charles Arthur Mercier
- Evan Powell Meredith ()
- George Meredith
- Prosper Mérimée
- Henry Merritt (artist) ()
- Jean Meslier
- Ilya Ilyich Mechnikov
- Hans Meyer (geologist)
- Louis Compton Miall
- Jules Michelet
- Karl Ludwig Michelet
- Conyers Middleton
- Domenico Milelli ( see it:Domenico Milelli)
- James Mill
- John Stuart Mill

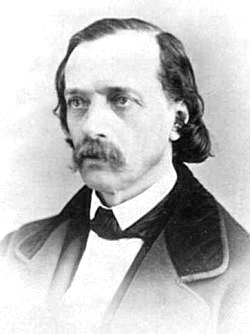
Jean-Baptiste Millière

- John Millar (philosopher)
- Constantin Mille
- Florence Fenwick Miller
- Alexandre Millerand
- Jean-Baptiste Millière ( see fr:Jean-Baptiste Millière)
- Richard Monckton Milnes
- Pavel Nikolayevich Milyukov
- Jean-Baptiste de Mirabaud
- Honoré Gabriel Riqueti, comte de Mirabeau
- Francisco de Miranda
- Octave Mirbeau
- Peter Chalmers Mitchell
- Carl Joseph Anton Mittermaier

=== Mo ===
- Jakob Moleschott
- Robert Molesworth
- William Molesworth
- Jean Baptiste Poquelin Molière

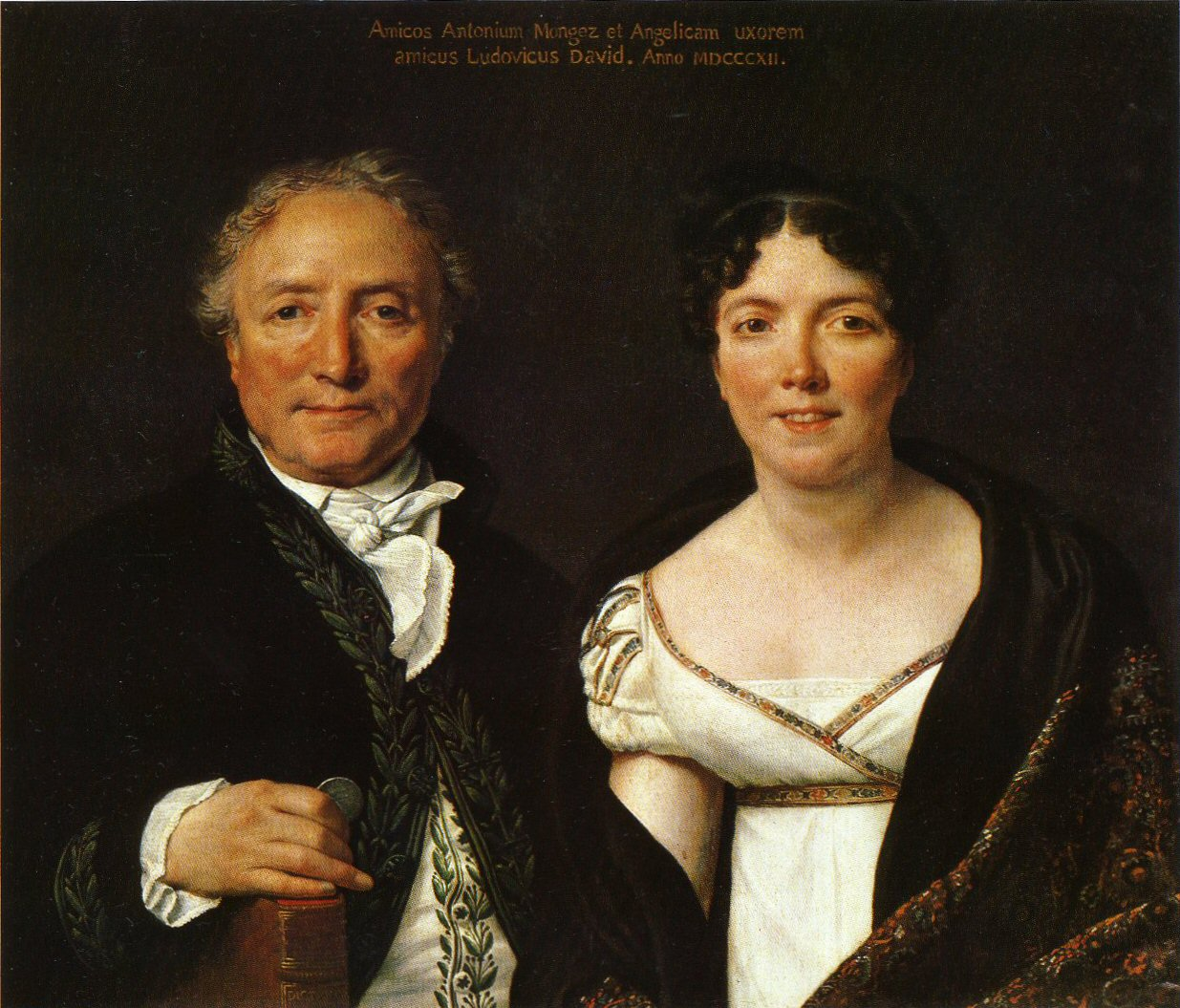
Antoine Mongez and Marie-Joséphine-Angélique Mongez

- John Charles Molteno
- Alfred Williams Momerie ( see s:Momerie, Alfred Williams (DNB01))
- Theodor Mommsen
- Lord Monboddo
- Gaspard Monge
- Antoine Mongez ( see fr:Antoine Mongez)
- J. R. Monroe ()

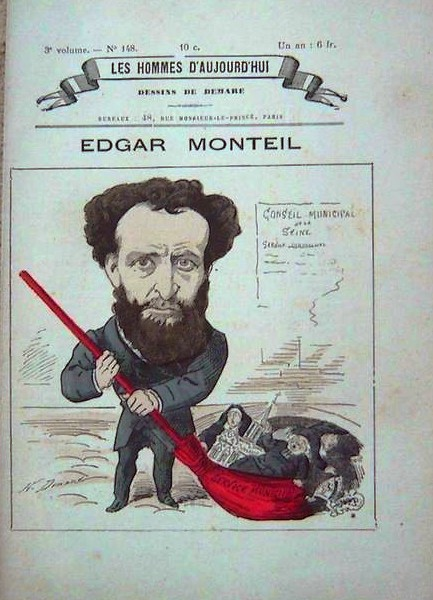
Edgar Monteil

- Messenger Monsey
- Basil Montagu
- Edward Montagu
- Mary Wortley Montagu
- Michel Eyquem de Montaigne
- Charles François Louis Edgar Monteil ( see fr:Edgar Monteil)
- Charles-Louis de Secondat, Baron de La Brède et de Montesquieu
- Anne-Pierre, marquis de Montesquiou-Fézensac
- Edmund Duncan Montgomery
- Joseph-Michel Montgolfier
- Friedrich Mook ( see de:Friedrich Mook)
- Benjamin Moore (biochemist)
- George Augustus Moore
- George Edward Moore
- John Howard Moore ()
- Miguel Moraita ()
- Hégésippe Moreau
- Jacques-Joseph Moreau
- André Morellet
- Giovanni Morelli
- N. Morelly ()
- William Richard Morfill
- Conwy Lloyd Morgan
- Thomas Morgan (deist)
- Thomas Charles Morgan
- Robert Burnett David Morier
- André Saturnin Morin ()
- James Augustus Cotter Morison
- John Morley

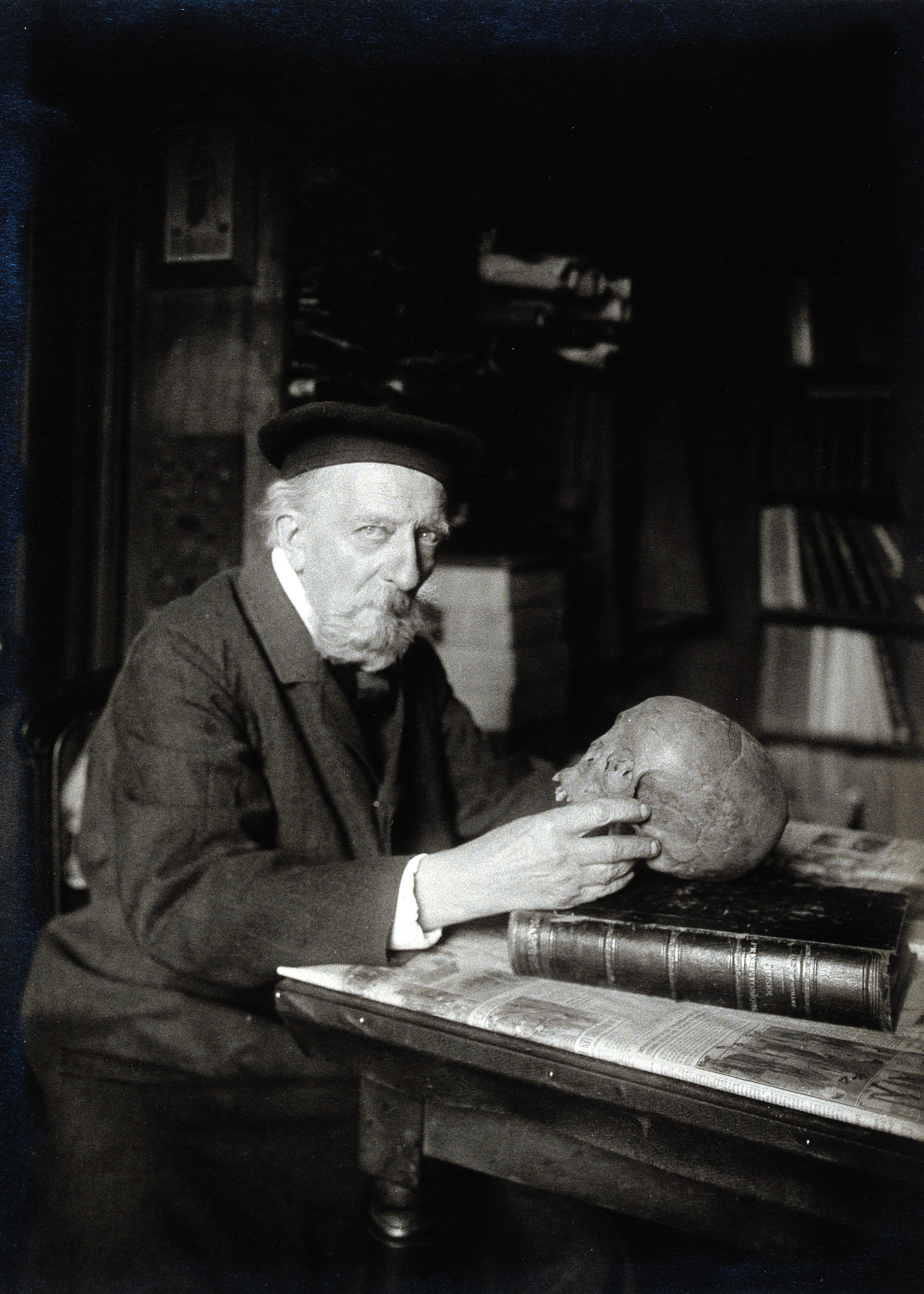
Adrien de Mortillet

- Gouverneur Morris
- William Morris
- George Ernest Morrison
- Edward Sylvester Morse
- Enrico "Henry" Agostino Morselli
- Adrien de Mortillet ( see fr:Adrien de Mortillet)
- Louis Laurent Gabriel de Mortillet
- Felix Stone Moscheles
- Arthur B. Moss ()
- Angelo Mosso
- John Lothrop Motley
- Wolfgang Amadeus Mozart
- John Henry Muirhead
- Friedrich Max Müller
- Hugo Münsterberg
- Roderick Impey Murchison
- Henri Murger
- Gilbert Murray
- Alfred Louis Charles de Musset-Pathay

== N ==
- Constance Caroline Woodhill Naden
- Jacques-André Naigeon
- Fridtjof Nansen
- Charles James Napier
- Alfred Joseph Naquet
- Francisco Manoel de Nascimento
- Gaetano Negri
- Ada Negri-Garlanda
- Gustav Nelson ()
- Carl Wilhelm Neumann ()
- Henry Woodd Nevinson
- Simon Newcomb
- H. Osman Newland ()
- Ernest Newman
- Francis William Newman
- George Newnes
- John Nichol (biographer)
- John Pringle Nichol
- William Nicholson (chemist)
- Christoph Friedrich Nicolai
- Barthold Georg Niebuhr
- Andrzej Niemojewski
- Friedrich Wilhelm Nietzsche
- Ferdinand Jacobus Domela Nieuwenhuis

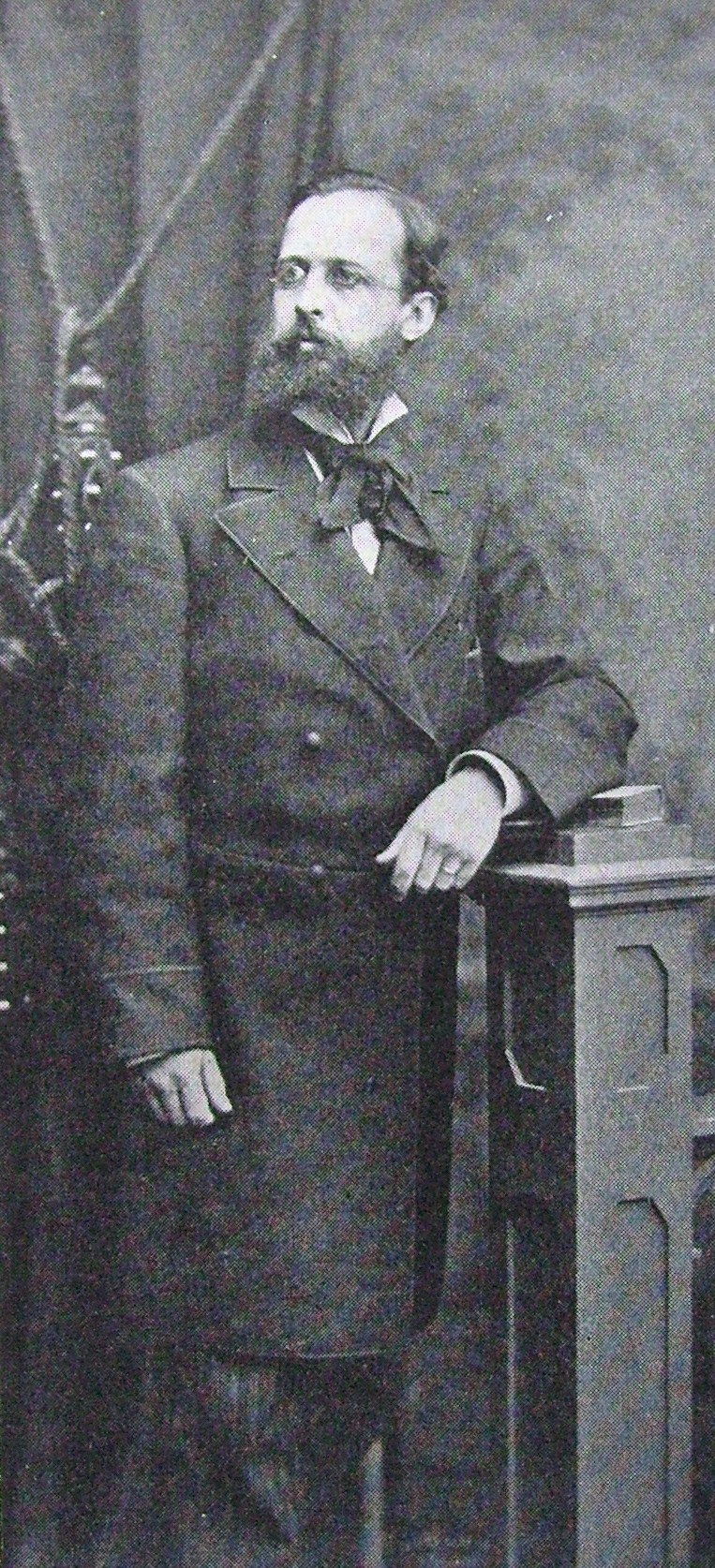
Christen Anton Nyström

- Florence Nightingale
- Ludwig Noiré
- Theodor Nöldeke
- Max Simon Nordau
- "F. Nork" ( see this)
- "Christopher North"
- Charles Eliot Norton
- Yakov Novikov ()
- Rufus King Noyes ()
- Christen Anton Nyström ( see sv:Anton Nyström)

== O ==
- James Bronterre O'Brien
- Arthur Condorcet-O'Connor
- George Odger

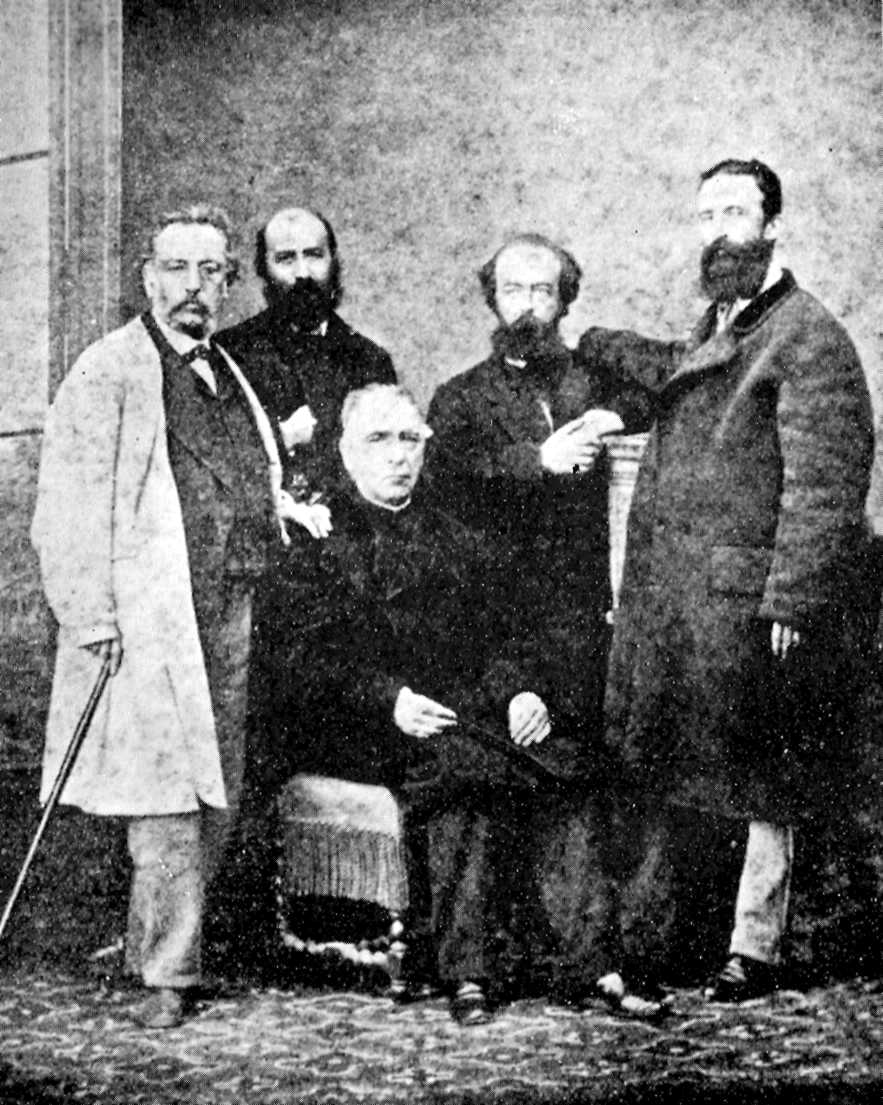
José María Orense (seated). Taken probably in Madrid, during the visit of Giuseppe Fanelli (furthest right) to Spain.

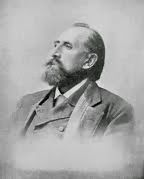
Felix Leopold Oswald

- Hans Christian Ørsted
- Bernardo O'Higgins
- Lorenz Oken
- Josiah Oldfield ()
- Giacomo Omboni ()
- Julius (Jules) Oppert
- Alfred Richard Orage
- Johann Caspar von Orelli
- José María Orense Milá de Aragón Herrero
- Arnold Edward Ortmann
- William Osler
- Sarah Margaret Fuller Ossoli
- Wilhelm Ostwald
- Eugen Oswald
- Felix Leopold Oswald ( see s:Felix Leopold Oswald)
- John Oswald (activist)
- "Ouida" (Marie Louise de la Ramée)
- Harry Allen Overstreet
- Richard Overton (Leveller)
- Robert Owen
- Robert Dale Owen

== P ==
- Jean Paul (Johann Paul Friedrich Richter)
- Edward John Pilcher ()

== R ==
=== Ra ===
- Carl Rabl
- Alfred Nicolas Rambaud
- Marie Louise de la Ramée "Ouida"
- Santiago Ramón y Cajal
- William Ramsay
- William James Ramsey ()
- Arthur Ranc
- Mario Rapisardi
- François-Vincent Raspail
- Samuel Kerkham Ratcliffe
- Albrecht Rau ()
- Henry Creswicke Rawlinson
- Guillaume Thomas François Raynal
- Carveth Read

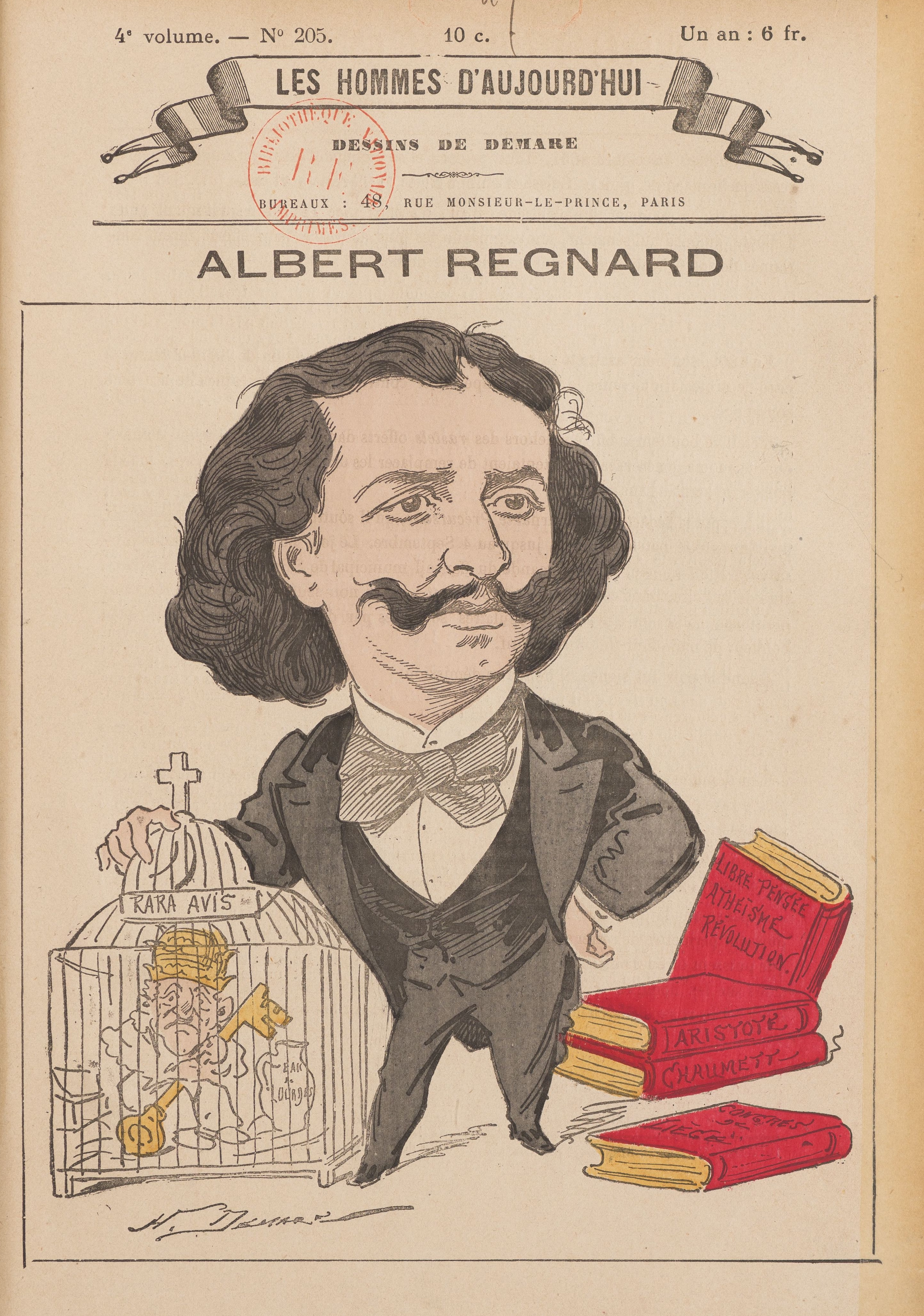
Albert Regnard

- William Winwood Reade
- Élie Reclus
- Jean Jacques Élisée Reclus
- Paul Reclus
- Mario Reghillini ()
- Albert-Adrien Regnard ( see fr:Albert Regnard)
- Michel-Louis-Étienne Regnaud de Saint-Jean d'Angély
- George Archdall O'Brien Reid
- Johann Christian Reil
- Hermann Samuel Reimarus
- Joseph Reinach
- Salomon Reinach
- Théodore Reinach
- Ernst Christian Gottlieb Reinhold
- Karl Leonhard Reinhold
- John Eleazer Remsburg
- Charles François Marie, Comte de Rémusat
- Jean-Pierre Abel-Rémusat
- Paul Louis Étienne Remusat
- Henriette Renan ()
- Joseph Ernest Renan
- Georges François Renard ()
- Charles Bernard Renouvier
- Karl Gustav Reuschle ( see de:Karl Gustav Reuschle)
- Marie Roch Louis Reybaud

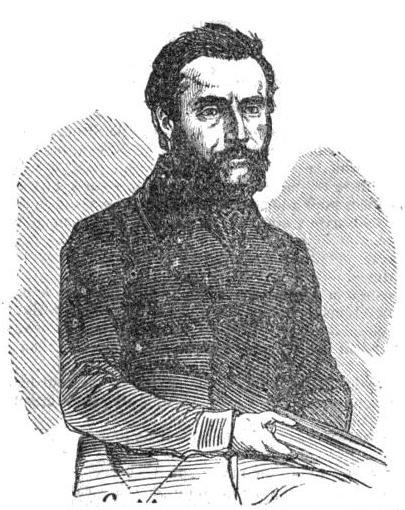
Charles Ribeyrolles

- Jean Ernest Reynaud
- Charles B. Reynolds ()
- Cecil John Rhodes
- John Rhys
- Charles Ribeyrolles ( see fr:Charles Ribeyrolles)
- Alexandre-Félix-Joseph Ribot
- Théodule-Armand Ribot
- David Ricardo
- Giuseppe Napoleone Ricciardi ( see it:Giuseppe Ricciardi (1808))
- Benjamin Ward Richardson
- Jean Richepin
- Charles Richet

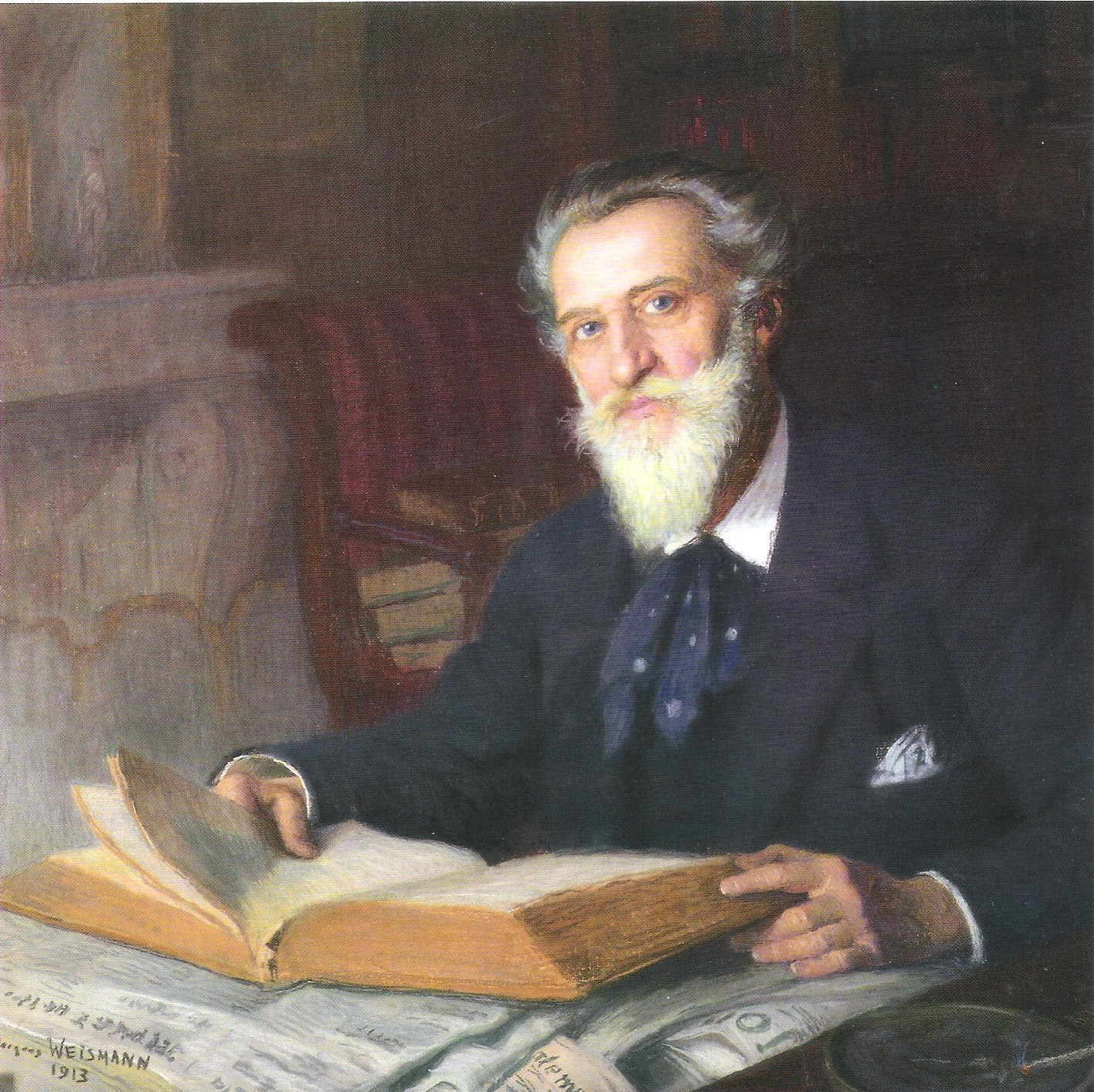
Gustave Rivet

- Johann Paul Friedrich Richter
- Thomas 'Clio' Rickman
- Aloys Adolf Riehl
- Eugenio Rignano
- David George Ritchie
- Gustave Rivet ( see fr:Gustave Rivet)
- José Rizal

=== Ro ===
- Matilda Roalfe
- Isaac Roberts
- Morley Roberts

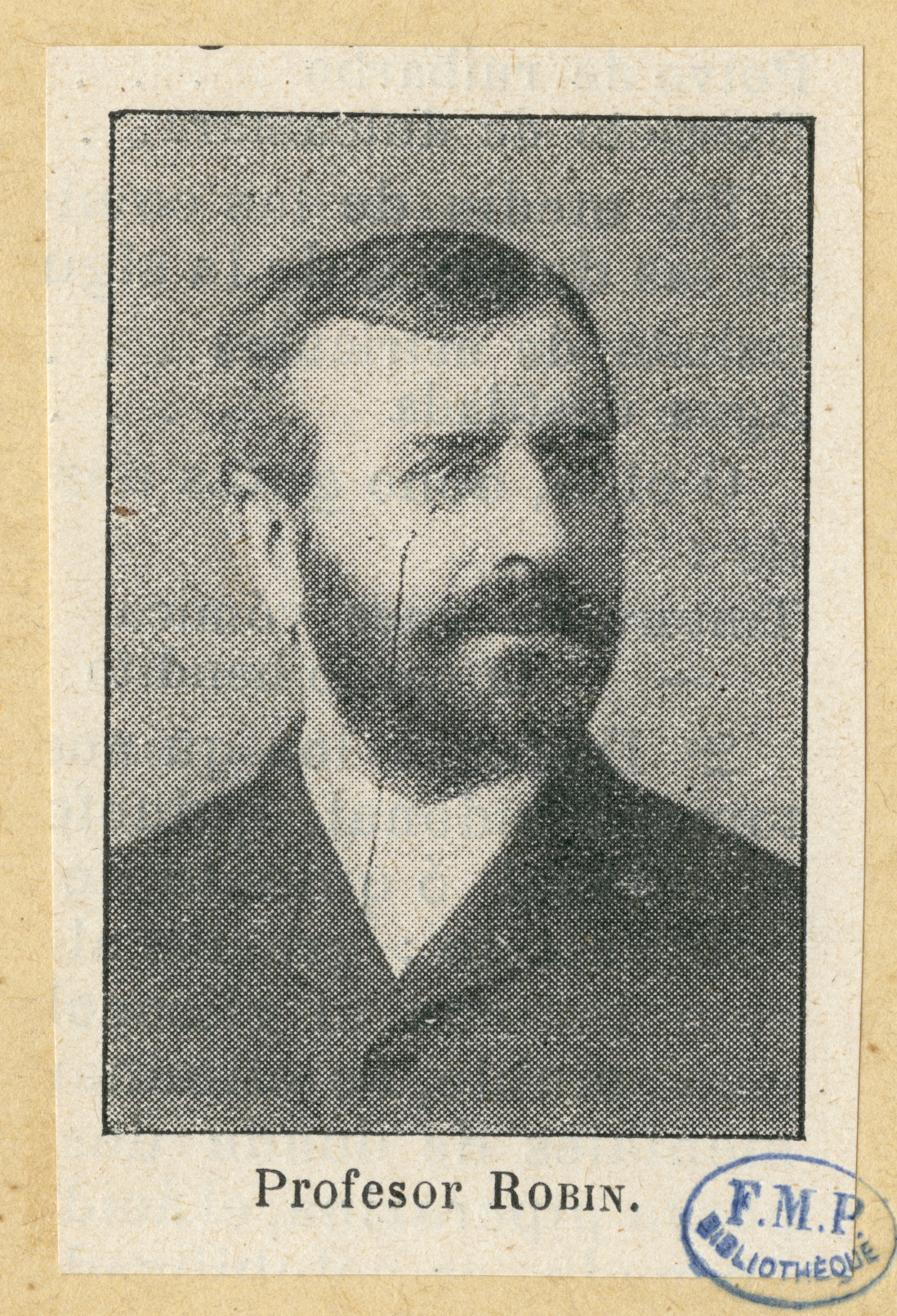
Albert Édouard Charles Robin

- R. Roberts ()
- George Croom Robertson
- John Mackinnon Robertson
- Eugène de Robert y de la Cerda ()
- Maximilien François Marie Isidore de Robespierre
- Charles-Philippe Robin
- Édouard Charles Albert Robin ()
- Jean-Baptiste-René Robinet

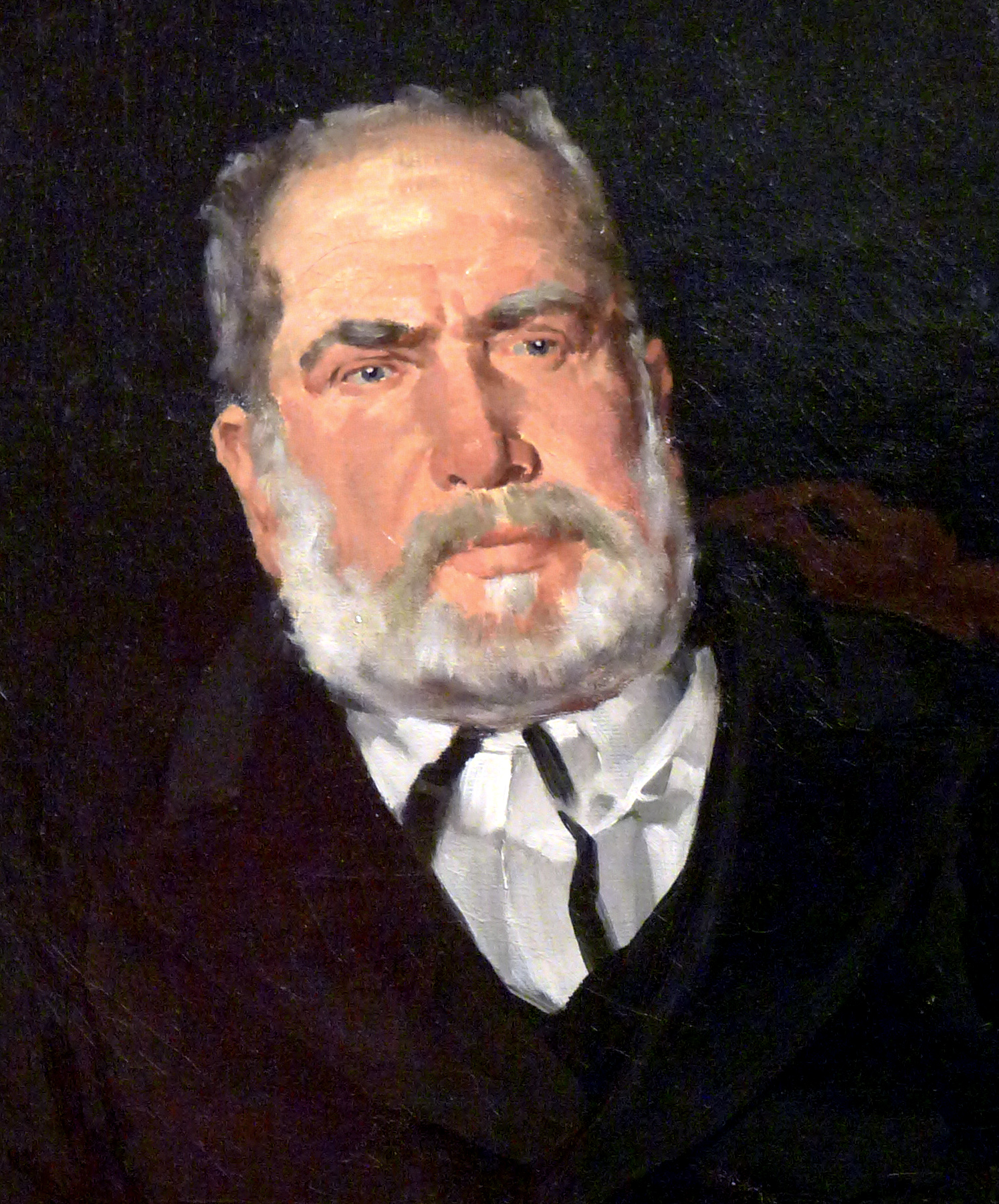
Louis-Augustin Rogeard. Detail from a painting by Louis Tinayre

- Jean-François Eugène Robinet
- Henry Crabb Robinson
- Louis Édouard Rod
- François Auguste René Rodin
- Louis-Augustin Rogeard ( see fr:Louis-Augustin Rogeard)
- James Edwin Thorold Rogers
- Karl von Rokitansky
- Jean Marie Roland de la Platière
- Marie-Jeanne Roland de la Platière
- Romain Rolland
- Thomas William Hazen Rolleston

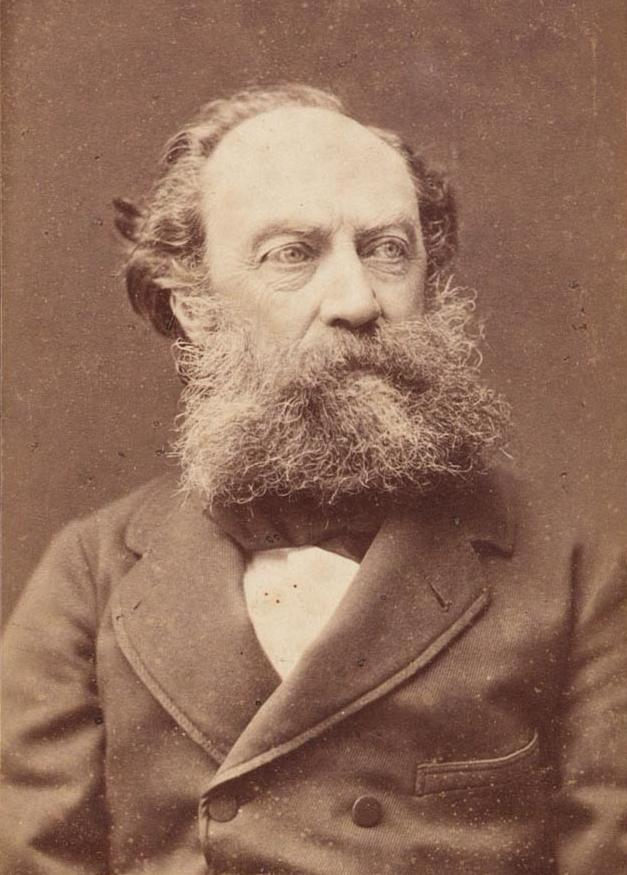
Sicco Roorda van Eysinga

- Gian Domenico Romagnosi
- Samuel Romilly
- Gilbert Romme
- Sicco Ernst Willem Roorda van Eysinga ( see fy:Sicco Roorda van Eysinga and nl:Sicco Roorda van Eysinga)
- Ernestine Louise Lasmond Potovsky Rose ()
- Johann Karl Friedrich Rosenkranz
- Georg Gustav Roskoff
- Joseph Henri Rosny
- Louis Léon Lucien Prunol de Rosny ( see fr:Léon de Rosny)
- Edward Alsworth Ross
- Ronald Ross
- William Stewart Ross
- Dante Gabriel Rossetti
- William Michael Rossetti
- Emil Adolf Rossmässler
- Edmond Eugène Alexis Rostand
- Karl Wenzeslaus Rodecker von Rotteck
- Jean-Jacques Rousseau
- Pierre Maurice Rouvier
- Josiah Royce
- Clémence Royer
- Arnold Ruge
- Cosimo Ruggieri ( see it:Cosimo Ruggieri and other wikis)
- John Ruskin
- Bertrand Arthur William Russell
- John Russell, Viscount Amberley
- John Russell (educationist) ()
- John Francis Stanley Russell
- "Mark Rutherford" (William Hale White)
- Abraham Viktor Rydberg

== W ==
- Samuel Waddington ()
- Richard Wagner

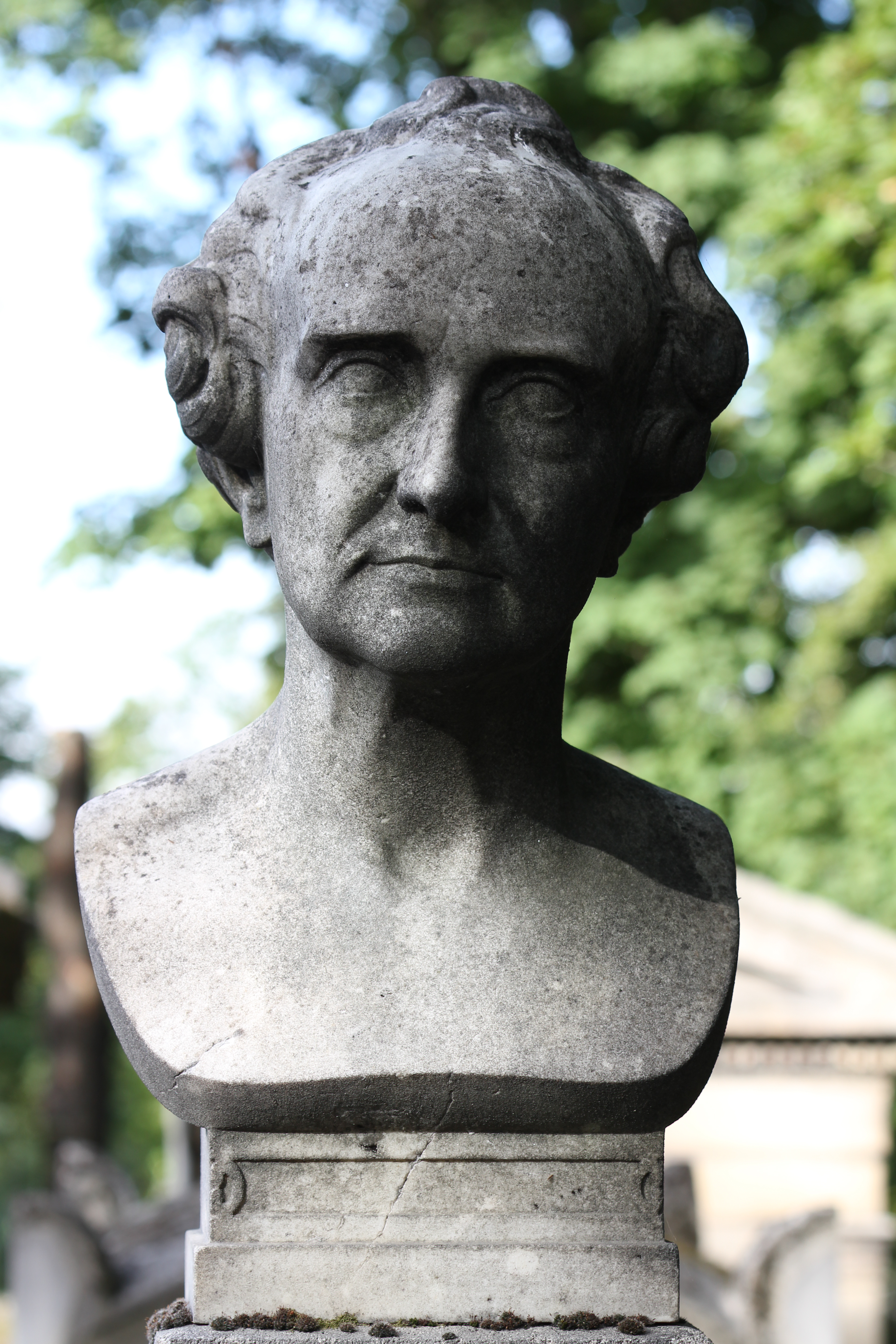
The grave of François Walferdin in the Père Lachaise Cemetery

- Charles Burlingame Waite
- Theodor Waitz
- Edward Wakefield
- Edward Gibbon Wakefield
- Gilbert Wakefield
- Thaddeus B. Wakeman ()
- Charles Athanase Walckenaer
- François Walferdin (see fr:François Walferdin)
- Ernest Walker
- John Walker ( adopted Quaker dress but not accepted into membership)
- Alfred Russel Wallace
- William Wallace
- Horace Walpole
- Robert Walpole
- Walter Walsh ()
- Johannes Walther
- William Walwyn
- Lester Frank Ward
- Josiah Warren
- Daisy Greville, Countess of Warwick
- L. K. Washburn ()
- George Washington
- James Watson
- William Watson
- James Watt
- Charles Watts
- Charles Albert Watts
- George Frederic Watts
- John Watts (writer) ()
- John Watts (reformer)
- Theodore Watts-Dunton
- Karl Julius Weber
- August Weismann
- Wilhelm Weitling
- Julius Wellhausen
- H. G. Wells
- Richard Brodhead Westbrook ()
- Baron Westbury
- Edvard Westermarck
- John Westlake
- Samuel Burns Weston ()
- Otto Wettstein ()
- George Whale (writer) ()
- Joseph Mazzini Wheeler ()
- James McNeill Whistler
- Andrew Dickson White
- William Hale White
- Walt Whitman
- Thomas Whittaker
- Adam Gowans Whyte ()

=== Wi ===
- Knut Wicksell
- Christoph Martin Wieland
- Otto Wigand ( see de:Otto Wigand and hu:Otto Wigand)
- Adolf Wilbrandt
- Ella Wheeler Wilcox
- John Wilkes
- Bruno Wille
- Charles Hanbury Williams
- David Williams
- Roger Williams
- William Mattieu Williams
- Robert Willis
- Andrew Wilson ()
- David Alec Wilson ()
- John Wilson (Scottish writer) (no article in the dictionary but cross-referenced from "Christopher North" here)
- Roland Knyvet Wilson
- Wyndham Wilton ()
- Hugo Winckler
- John Richard de Capel Wise ( and ebooks)
- Gustav Adolf Wislicenus
- Susan H. Wixon ()
- William Wollaston
- Mary Wollstonecraft
- Henry Wood
- Thomas Jonathan Wooler

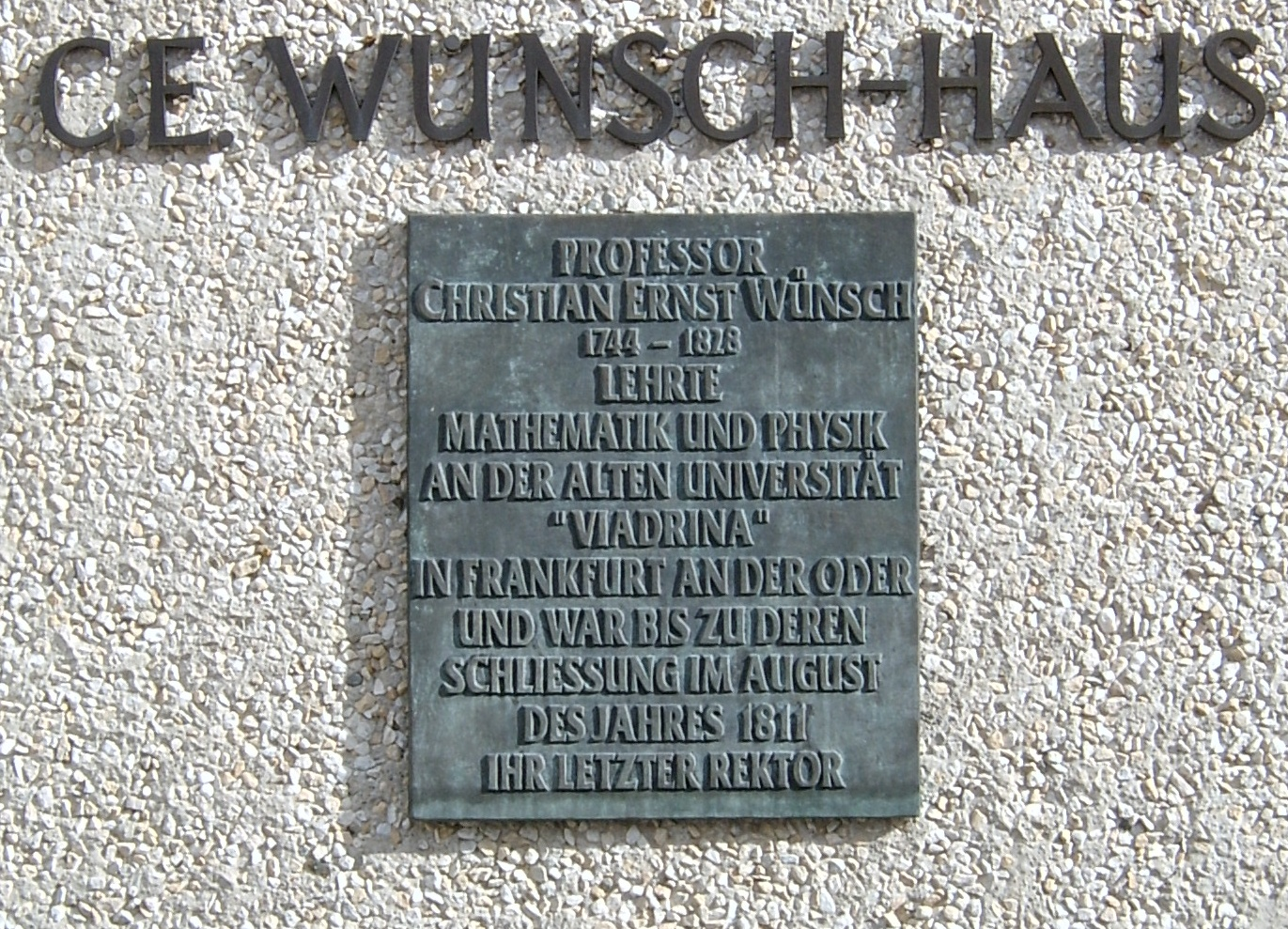
Plaque on the house where Christian Ernst Wünsch lived in the Mühlenweg student quarter of Frankfurt (Oder)

- Thomas Woolner
- Thomas Woolston
- Chauncey Wright
- Elizur Wright
- Michael Wright (Owenite) ()
- Clement Writer
- Wilhelm Max Wundt
- Christian Ernst Wünsch (see pl:Christian Ernst Wünsch)
- Charles-Adolphe Wurtz
- Grigorio Nicolaievich Wyrouboff

== X ==
- Augustin Louis de Ximénès ()

== Y ==
- Percival Macleod Yearsley ( see this at UCL)
- Edward L. Youmans
- William Jay Youmans
- Francis Younghusband

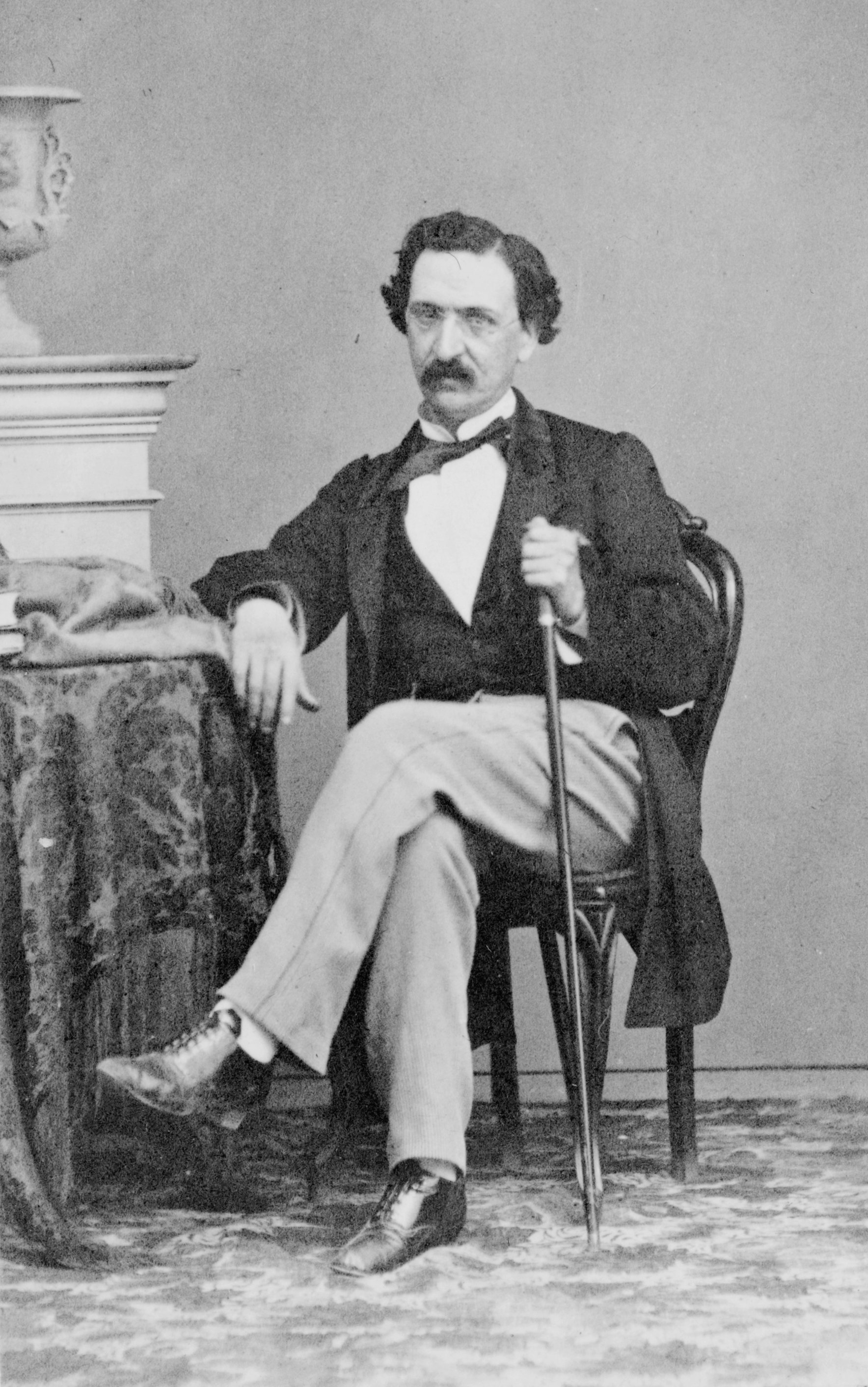
Francisco Zarco

== Z ==
- Giuseppe Zanardelli
- Israel Zangwill
- Francisco Zarco ( see es:Francisco Zarco)
- Eduard Zeller
- Gustav Zerffi
- Heinrich Ernst Ziegler ( see de:Heinrich Ernst Ziegler)
- Theobald Ziegler
- Georg Theodor Ziehen
- Helen Zimmern
- Émile Zola
- Manuel Ruiz Zorrilla
- Charles Zueblin
- Luigi Zuppetta ( see it:Luigi Zuppetta)
