= Salvador Calderón y Arana =

Spanish naturalist, geologist and mineralogist

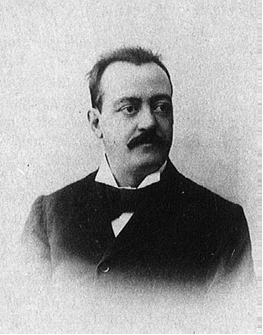
- Born: 22 August 1851; Madrid, Spain
- Died: 3 July 1911 (aged 59)
- Education: Central University of Madrid
- Notable work: Los minerales de España (1910)
- Scientific career
- Fields: natural history geology mineralogy
- Thesis: ¿Es o no el hombre animal?

Salvador Calderón y Arana (Madrid, 22 August 1851 – 3 July 1911) was a Spanish naturalist, geologist, and mineralogist. He is mainly known for his work in topographical mineralogy, Los minerales de España (The Minerals of Spain), published in 1910.

== Biography ==
Salvador Calderón y Arana was born in Madrid. After studying some courses in medicine, he switched to studying Natural Sciences at the Central University of Madrid, completing his degree in 1871. In 1872, he presented his doctoral thesis titled ¿Es o no el hombre animal? (Is Man an Animal or Not?). A sector of the more conservative Spanish naturalists in political and religious aspects proposed a taxonomy that established a different kingdom for humans, the hominal kingdom, independent of the animal kingdom. Calderón argued that humans are just another animal, based mainly on comparative anatomy, supporting Darwin's concepts of evolution and natural selection. In 1874, he obtained the chair of Natural History at the secondary education institute on the island of Las Palmas, in Gran Canaria, Canary Islands. During his stay on this island, he carried out a study of the island's rocks, which led to one of his first publications, Reseña de las rocas de la isla volcánica Gran Canaria (Review of the Rocks of the Volcanic Island Gran Canaria). In this work, reviewed in the English scientific journal Nature, he noted that he had not found rocks of the "sanidine-trachyte" type but that the predominant felspathic constituent of the most acidic rocks was always plagioclase.

In 1875, at the beginning of the monarchic restoration in Spain, the Minister Manuel Orovio Echagüe, responsible for education, promulgated a Royal Decree that eliminated the freedom of teaching and required that education conform to Catholic orthodoxy and the monarchical regime. Many professors protested against this order, refusing to comply, resulting in their expulsion from their chairs. The first two, at the University of Santiago de Compostela, were Augusto González de Linares, professor of Natural History, and Laureano Calderón y Arana, professor of Organic Chemistry Pharmacy, and brother of Salvador Calderón y Arana.

Salvador Calderón stood in solidarity with his brother and the other professors and was also expelled along with many others. After losing their jobs, several of these professors (including Francisco Giner de los Ríos, Gumersindo de Azcárate, Teodoro Sainz Rueda, and Nicolás Salmerón) founded the Institución Libre de Enseñanza (Free Institution of Education) in 1876, which also had the support of Joaquín Costa, José Ortega y Gasset, Gregorio Marañón, Ramón Menéndez Pidal, and Santiago Ramón y Cajal, among others. From 1877, Calderón traveled to various locations in Germany, Vienna (Austria), where he studied with Gustav Tschermak, and Paris (France), working as a Spanish teacher.

In 1880, he was hired by the Government of Nicaragua, along with Joseph Józéf (José) Leonard, who had collaborated with the Institución Libre de Enseñanza, to establish a higher education center, the Instituto de Occidente, in the city of León (Nicaragua). Leonard and Calderón arrived in Nicaragua from Spain on November 14, 1880. The freethinking character of both sparked protests from the most reactionary sectors of Nicaraguan society, leading to disturbances and even an attempted assassination. On August 16, 1881, Calderón resigned from the Instituto de Occidente and returned to Spain. His stay in Nicaragua allowed him to conduct some research, publishing the first scientific study on the geology of Nicaragua.

In 1881, a new liberal government in Spain reinstated the repressed professors to their positions. Calderón regained his post as a secondary education Natural History professor, and as compensation for his expulsion, he was granted a commission to visit the main Natural History museums in Europe. In November 1884, he obtained the position of Natural History professor at the University of Seville. In 1895, he obtained the chair of Mineralogy and Botany at the Central University of Madrid, and later the chair of Descriptive Mineralogy and the position of head of the Mineralogy Section of the Natural Sciences Museum.

Salvador Calderón had already been working on a topographical mineralogy of Spain long before obtaining the chair at the University of Madrid in 1895. From 1896, he published a series of articles in different journals reviewing Spanish deposits of various minerals such as plagioclase, cassiterite, chalcocite, and others. In 1902, he published in Germany, along with Conrad Friedrich August Tenne, the book Die Mineralfundstätten der Iberischen Halbinsel, the first comprehensive work published on the minerals of the Iberian Peninsula.

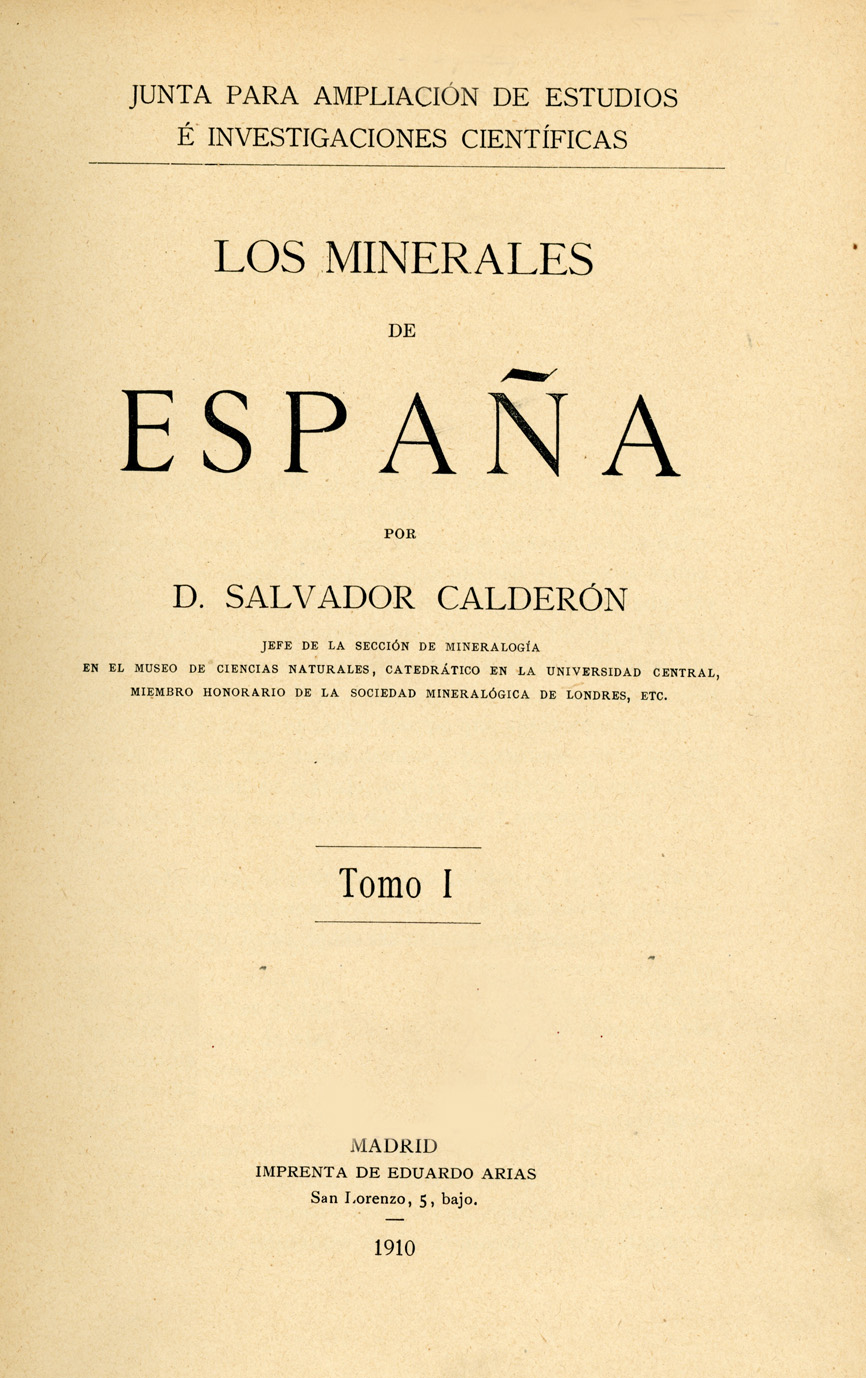
Cover of the Book Los Minerales de España

In 1907, the Junta para la Ampliación de Estudios e Investigaciones Científicas (Board for Advanced Studies and Scientific Research) granted Salvador Calderón a pension so that he could continue his study on Spanish topographical mineralogy. Between 1907 and 1909, Calderón was able to complete his work. The Junta para la Ampliación de Estudios e Investigaciones Científicas also took care of the publication of the book Los Minerales de España. This work uses the classification system of Paul Heinrich von Groth, common at that time, and describes the Spanish localities of nearly 300 mineral species. Among them is the description of a new mineral species, named almeriite, discovered in Adra (Almería). Unfortunately, a printing error in the representation of the chemical composition of almeriite (which repeated that of the previous species) made it appear as another already known mineral. The following year, this mineral was named natroalunite, which is the name currently used. It has been considered the reference book of topographic mineralogy in Spain throughout the 20th century. The Spanish Society of Mineralogy reissued this book in the year 2000.

Calderón was also the author, along with Ignacio Bolívar and Francisco Quiroga, of a textbook titled Elementos de Historia Natural (Elements of Natural History), intended for secondary and university education, originally published in 1890, which underwent several subsequent editions. He also wrote a small popular science book titled Mineralogy, which was initially published in 1900 in the Soler manual collection, and subsequently reprinted several times until 1929. It was the first book in Spain to bring the fundamentals of mineralogy to a broad audience.
