= Laureano Calderón Arana =

Spanish chemist, pharmacist, physicist, and crystallographer (1847–1894)

Laureano Calderón
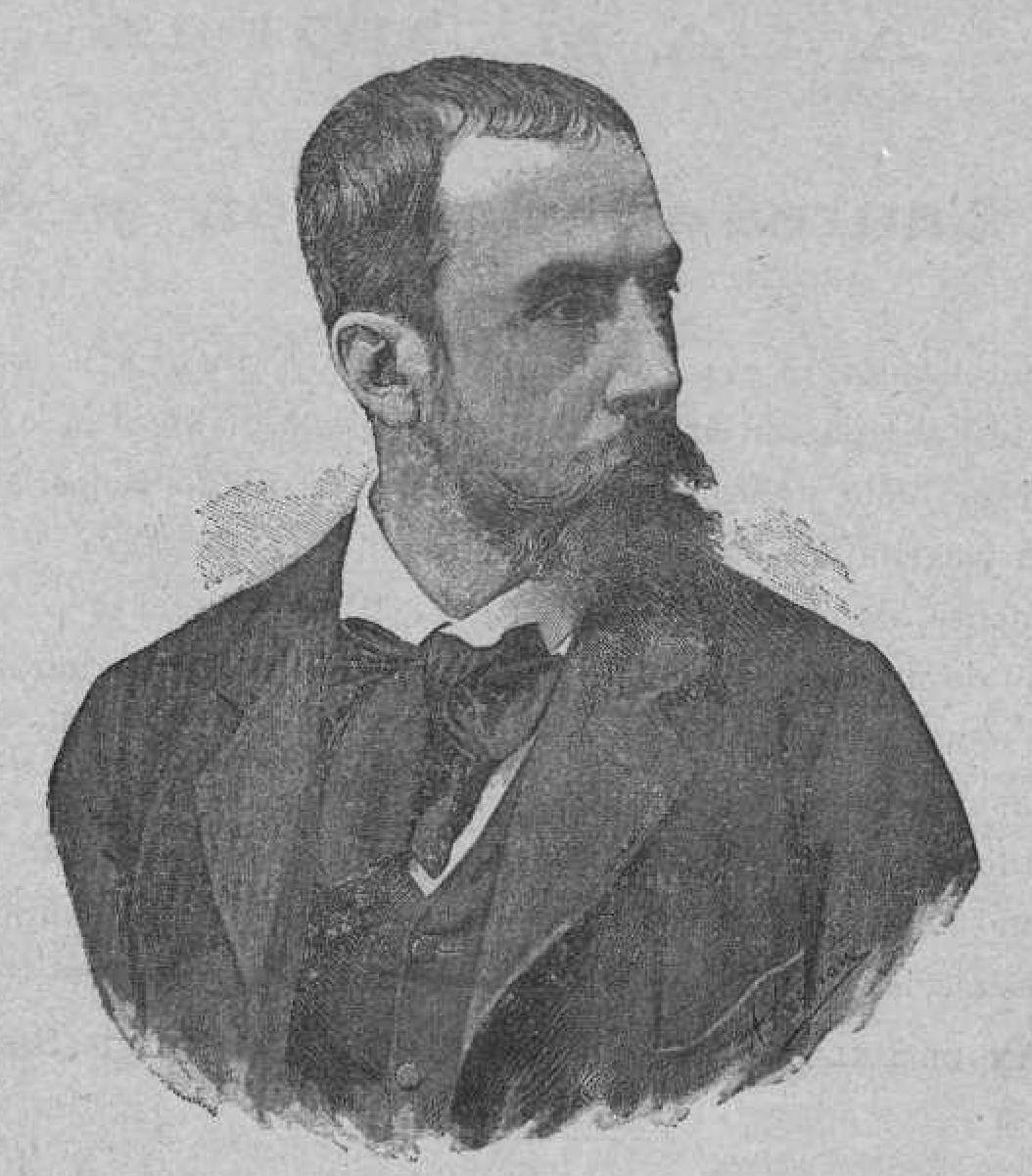
- Portrayed in La Farmacia Moderna
- Born: July 4, 1847
- Died: March 4, 1894 (aged 46); Cementerio civil de Madrid
- Citizenship: Spain
- Education: Central University of Madrid
- Occupations: Professor, chemist, pharmacist, physicist, and crystallographer
- Employer: Central University of Madrid

Laureano Calderón y Arana (Madrid, 4 July 1847 – Madrid, 4 March 1894) was a Spanish chemist, pharmacist, physicist and crystallographer, brother of the also scientist Salvador Calderón and of the journalist Alfredo Calderón y Arana. Associated with the Institución Libre de Enseñanza, he was the inventor of an instrument for crystallographic studies called the «estauróscopo» and one of the pioneers in the study and teaching of biochemistry in Spain.

== Biography ==
Son of Antonio María Calderón, native of Campuzano, Province of Santander, and of María Ignacia Arana de Barrenechea, native of Usúrbil; he was born in Madrid on 4 July 1847. (Note: He was baptized on the 9th by the deputy priest of the parish church of San Luis, Pedro Alba.) He had as brothers Alfredo, who was born three years later, in 1850, and Salvador. Disciple of Manuel Rioz y Pedraja, he graduated in Pharmacy in 1866 at the Central University; he soon won, by competition, the position of assistant and auxiliary in the Faculty of Pharmacy of said institution.

After competitions he held in 1874, he obtained the chair of Organic chemistry at the University of Santiago de Compostela. He has been noted for his inclusion, during the 1870s, in a group of followers of Darwinist lines of thought, called "novísimo movement of natural philosophy", a term apparently coined by his brother Alfredo, among whom, in addition to Laureano Calderón, were the scientists Augusto González de Linares, Odón de Buen, his other brother —Salvador—, Blas Lázaro Ibiza, Enrique Serrano Fatigati or José Rodríguez Carracido. He was a follower of the ideas of Julián Sanz del Río and Francisco Giner de los Ríos, having been described as their "disciple".

I have not been appointed professor to form catechumens of any political system, but only to teach science, in which truth is sought, without distinction of origins.

— Laureano Calderón Arana

After the measures taken by the Marquis of Orovio, Minister of Development, regarding Public Instruction, (Note: After the fall of the First Spanish Republic and the end of the period known as Sexenio Democrático, the period known as Restoration began, at whose beginning a Royal Order and a circular from the Minister of Development, the Marquis of Orovio, published on 26 February 1875 returned the situation regarding education to the state prior to the Revolution of 1868, strongly restricting academic freedom, as the programs of the different subjects passed to State control and the teaching of knowledge "contrary to the Catholic dogma" was denied. In the words of the decree, "the damages that absolute freedom has caused in teaching, the repeated complaints of parents and the students themselves, the duty that the Government has to watch over morality and sound doctrines and the sense of responsibility that weighs on it, justify and require its intervention in official teaching".) the protests of Calderón in defense of academic freedom —branded as "energetic" and "vehement"— caused him to be imprisoned, together with Augusto González de Linares, in the Castle of San Antón in A Coruña, after a Royal Order dated 12 April 1875.

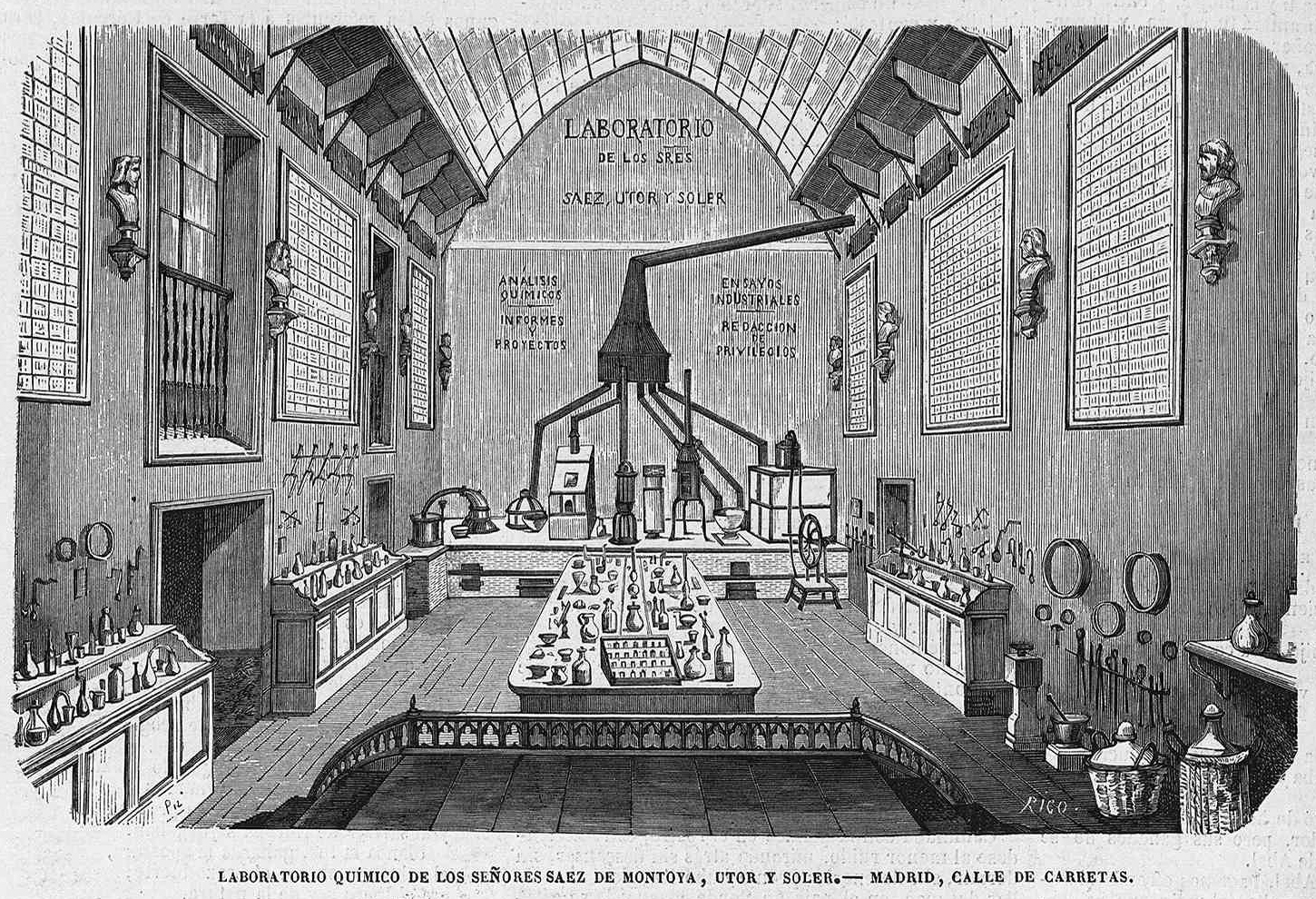
Chemical laboratory of Saez, Utor and Soler in 1868, before being acquired by Calderón, Calle de Carretas, Madrid, in El Museo Universal.

Having obtained freedom, although stripped of his chair, he moved to Paris, deciding to expatriate himself; there he became a disciple of Marcellin Berthelot, whom he helped in his studies of chemical synthesis and whose works on thermochemistry he continued later. Later he emigrated to Germany, where he studied crystallography with Paul von Groth, in Strasbourg, (Note: After the Franco-Prussian War of 1870-1871 most of the Alsace region had passed to belong to the German Empire, a situation that lasted until the First World War. where shortly after he was appointed director of practical works of Crystallography and Mineralogy.) In this stay in both countries he also worked with Claude Bernard, Éleuthère Mascart or Felix Hoppe-Seyler. Calderón devised an instrument for crystallographic studies that was named «estauróscopo».

After his experiences abroad, he returned to Spain, in 1880. Considered one of the creators of the Institución Libre de Enseñanza —his protests against the Marquis of Orovio, together with those of other professors, giving rise to the birth of this— and a "prestigious man of science of the Institution", he was in fact included in the list of professors of the ILE, but never came to exercise as such. His chair was not restored until 3 March 1881, when the Minister of Development José Luis Albareda declared his rights reinstated. Member of some foreign scientific societies, he was part of the International Commission for the reform of chemical nomenclature and honorary positions were granted to him in various scientific congresses he attended. (Note: He was, for example, vice-president of the Chemical Congress of Paris in 1889 and honorary president of the chemical section of the French Association for the Advancement of Sciences, around 1892.) According to José Gutiérrez Abascal, "Laureano Calderón was much better known as an eminent chemist abroad, and especially in Germany and France, than in Spain".

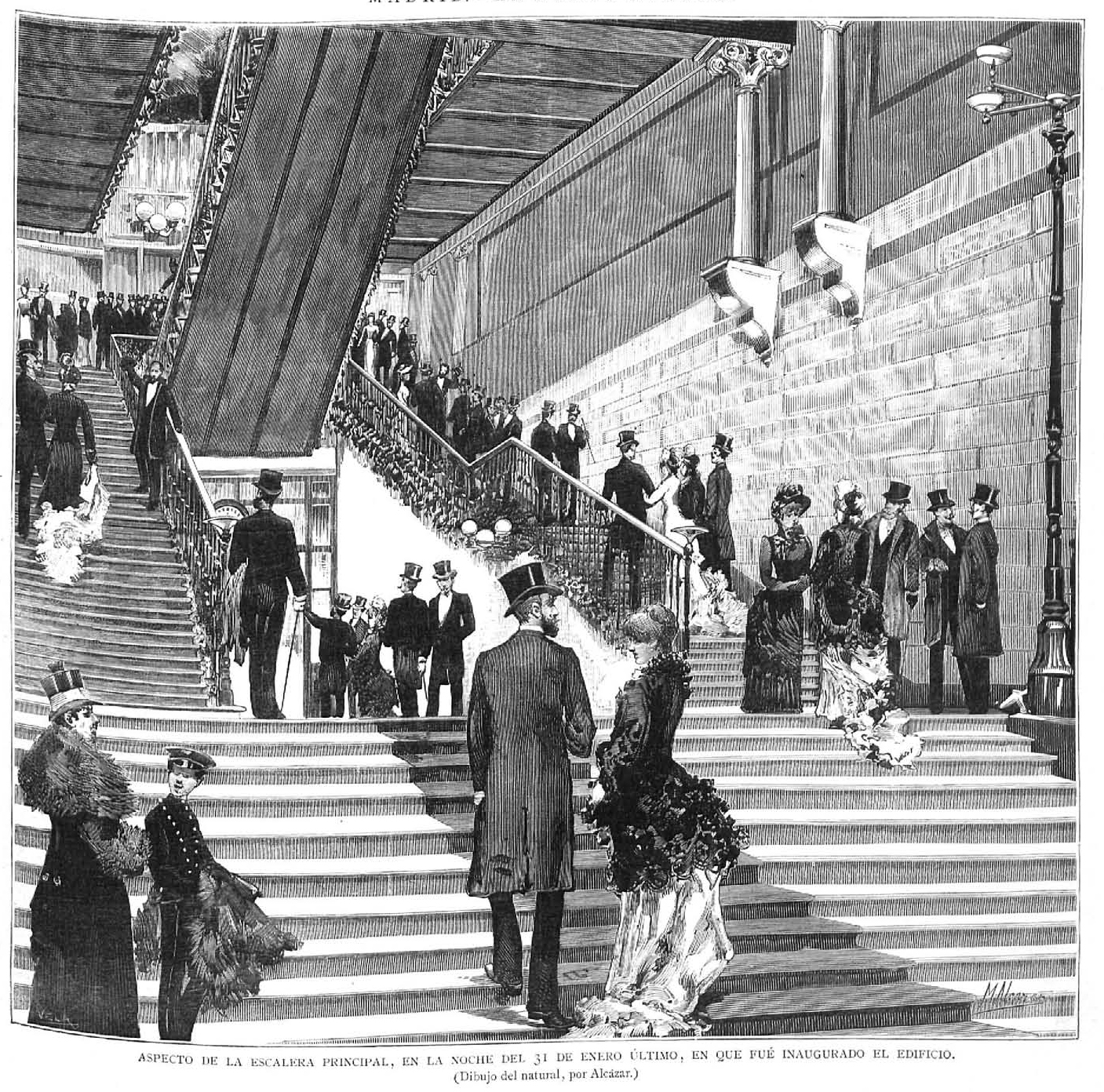
Inauguration in 1884 of the new building of the Ateneo de Madrid, in La Ilustración Española y Americana.

He had a laboratory installed on Calle de Carretas, acquired in 1880 and originally founded by Saez, Utor and Soler, where analyses of various substances were carried out, including urine. In 1884 he was asked to study the industrial exploitation of the Laguna de Fuente Piedra, proposing the installation of a fertilizer factory; he was promoter of the Compañía Agrícola Salinera, whose direction was entrusted to him and which worked in the production of superphosphates. (Note: He directed the company until 1888.)

In 1884 he gave a notable speech at the Ateneo de Madrid —institution of whose Section of Natural Sciences he was president, re-elected, for a period of three years— on the occasion of the inauguration of the new building of the institution, in which Calderón expressed "his firm conviction that the new science of thermodynamics provided the foundational basis to solve the pressing problems of society".

The death of Laureano Calderón has made evident the isolation in which science lives in Spain. All the media joined together to pay first-class funeral honors to the eminent professor, but in life how little they encouraged him in the pursuit of his scientific works!

— José Rodríguez Carracido.

In 1888 he was granted the chair of Biological Chemistry and Critical History of Pharmacy at the Central University of Madrid, (Note: This appointment would have been supported by Fausto Garagarza, then councilor of Public Instruction, his friend since his time in Santiago de Compostela. Among the "merits and services" of Calderón to be granted the chair cited in La Gaceta de Madrid is that he published various memoirs in the Comptes-rendus of the French Academy of Sciences, among them "Studies of the different rotary powers presented by cane sugar", "Properties of resorcinol", "Molecular volumes of resorcinol", "Thermochemical studies of resorcinol", in addition to various articles in Groth's Journal of Crystallography in German: "Optical observations on cane sugar crystals", "Observations on a new estauroscope and modifications to Groth's universal crystallographic apparatus", "Crystallographic studies on some organic substances", "Optical properties of the blend of Picos de Europa", "The iodonitric plates, in collaboration with Professors Groth and Nilson" and "Description of the mineralogical collection of Strasbourg, in collaboration with Groth".) an event that has been associated with the beginning of biochemistry in Spain, although others assign the merit to Carracido, later than Arana. In 1892 he gave the speech La química descriptiva y la química racional at the Central University, as the opening of the academic year.

He was the author of Los explosivos y pólvoras sin humo, a work he did not live to see published; in this sense his not very outstanding research activity has been negatively underlined and that he did not translate foreign works, in fact, according to Francisco Javier Puerto, conservative historiography would have labeled him as "disseminator", despising his scientific work. He died on 4 March 1894 in Madrid at the age of forty-six, (Note: The cause of death at such an early age is unknown. The most explicit source in this regard states "he has fallen wounded by unexpected death and without cause. A simple chance of fatality!".) and was buried in the civil cemetery of the city. (Note: At the funeral, which took place on 6 March 1894, personalities such as Eduardo Vincenti, Fausto Garagarza, Gumersindo Azcárate, Nicolás Salmerón, Giner de los Ríos, Tolosa Latour, Adelardo Ortiz de Pinedo or his brother Alfredo Calderón, among others, attended.)

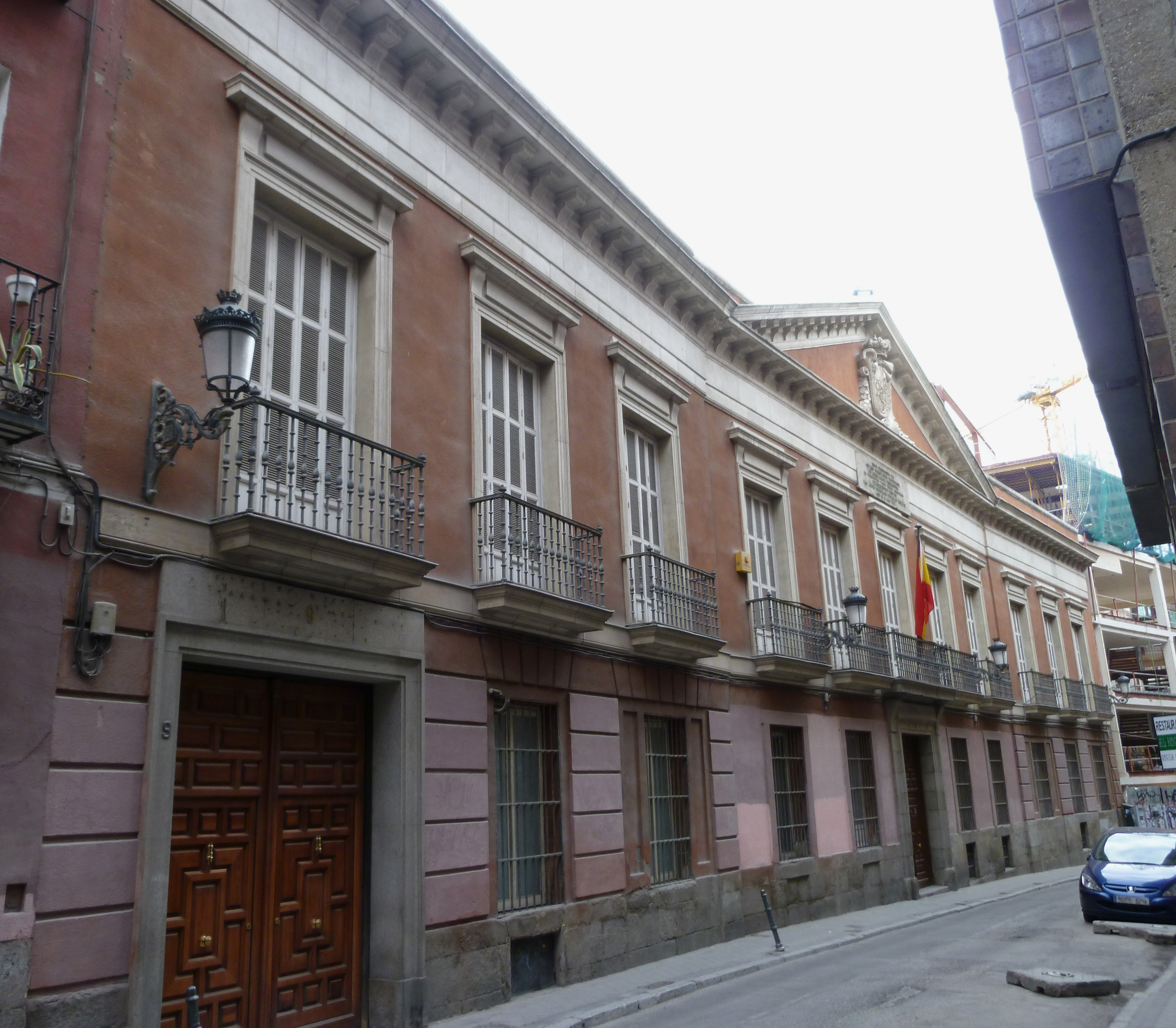
Current headquarters of the Real Academia Nacional de Farmacia on Calle de la Farmacia —formerly "Calle de San Juan"—, former location of the Faculty of Pharmacy of the Central University.

== Bibliography ==
- Calderón y Arana, Laureano (1884). "Discurso leído el 1.º de febrero por D. Laureano Calderón y Arana en la inauguración de los debates de la Sección de Ciencias Exactas, Físicas y Naturales". Discursos leídos en el Ateneo científico, literario y artístico de Madrid, con motivo de la apertura del curso de 1884 [Speeches read at the Scientific, Literary and Artistic Ateneo of Madrid, on the occasion of the opening of the 1884 course] (PDF) (in Spanish). Madrid: Imprenta central a cargo de Víctor Saiz. pp. 100–136. Archived from the original (PDF) on 23 September 2015.
- Calderón y Arana, Laureano (1892). "Discurso leído en la Universidad Central en la ... inauguracion del curso académico de 1892 a 1893 por el Doctor D. Laureano Calderón y Arana" [Speech read at the Central University at the ... opening of the academic year 1892 to 1893 by Doctor Mr. Laureano Calderón y Arana]. Imp. Colonial a cargo de G. Gutiérrez (in Spanish). Madrid.
- Codina Castellví, José (1894). "Notas biográficas" [Biographical notes]. La Farmacia Moderna (in Spanish). 5 (10): 146–149. ISSN 0213-036X.
- Codina Castellví, José (1894b). "El expediente universitario y el Procedimiento judicial" [The university file and the judicial procedure]. La Farmacia Moderna (in Spanish). 5 (10): 150–153. ISSN 0213-036X.
- Codina Castellví, José (1894c). "Calderón como Profesor de Química biológica" [Calderón as Professor of Biological Chemistry]. La Farmacia Moderna (in Spanish). 5 (10): 154–156. ISSN 0213-036X.
- Encina, Juan de la (9 July 1897). "Siluetas. Laureano Calderón" [Silhouettes. Laureano Calderón]. Germinal (in Spanish). I (10). Madrid: 1–2.
- Gómez García, María Nieves (1983). "El real decreto y la circular del Marqués de Orovio de 1875: repercusiones en el claustro universitario y la prensa de Sevilla" [The royal decree and the circular of the Marquis of Orovio of 1875: repercussions in the university cloister and the Seville press]. Historia de la educación: Revista interuniversitaria (in Spanish) (2): 325–336. ISSN 0212-0267.
- Gurriarán, Ricardo (2011). "Científicos, represión y exilio en la Universidad de Santiago". In Josep Lluís Barona Vilar (ed.). El exilio científico republicano [Scientists, repression and exile at the University of Santiago] (in Spanish). Universitat de València. ISBN 978-84-3708-479-4.
- Illana, José (2009). "Apuntes sobre la bioquímica en España" [Notes on biochemistry in Spain]. Anales de la Real Sociedad Española de Química (in Spanish) (4). Real Sociedad Española de Química: 310–318. ISSN 1575-3417.
- Jiménez-Landi, Antonio (1996). La Institución Libre de Enseñanza y su ambiente: Los orígenes de la Institución [The Free Teaching Institution and its environment: The origins of the Institution] (in Spanish). Edicions Universitat Barcelona. ISBN 978-84-8936-596-4.
- Kasabal (17 March 1894). "Madrid" [Madrid]. La Ilustración Ibérica (in Spanish) (585): 162–163. ISSN 1695-937X.
- Macías, Ricardo (1894). "La personalidad científica de Laureano Calderón" [The scientific personality of Laureano Calderón]. La Farmacia Moderna (in Spanish). 5 (10): 156–159. ISSN 0213-036X.
- Martí Gilabert, Francisco (1991). Política religiosa de la Restauración, 1875-1931 [Religious policy of the Restoration, 1875-1931] (in Spanish). Ediciones Rialp. ISBN 978-84-3212-813-4.
- Martín Sanz, José Luis (1984). "Científicos y naturalistas: una aportación a la historia de la ciencia española reciente" [Scientists and naturalists: a contribution to the history of recent Spanish science]. Cuadernos de Historia Moderna y Contemporánea (in Spanish) (5): 163–186. ISSN 0211-0849.
- Morote, Luis (15 May 1913). "En el cementerio civil. Un artículo de Luis Morote" [In the civil cemetery. An article by Luis Morote] (PDF). El Motín (in Spanish). 33 (20): 4. ISSN 1889-8904. Archived from the original (PDF) on 18 May 2015.
- Muñoz Ramos, Eugenio (1892). "Bibliografía. Un discurso del profesor L. Calderón" [Bibliography. A speech by Professor L. Calderón]. La Farmacia Moderna (in Spanish). 3 (31): 494–496. ISSN 0213-036X.
- Núñez Espallargas, José María; Servat Susagne, Jordi (1988). "La matemática y la Institución Libre de Enseñanza: concepciones teóricas y pedagógicas" [Mathematics and the Free Teaching Institution: theoretical and pedagogical conceptions]. Llull: Revista de la Sociedad Española de Historia de las Ciencias y de las Técnicas (in Spanish). 11 (20): 75–96. ISSN 0210-8615.
- Ortiz García, Carmen; Sánchez Gómez, Luis Ángel (1994). Diccionario histórico de la antropología española [Historical Dictionary of Spanish Anthropology] (in Spanish). CSIC. ISBN 978-84-0007-443-2.
- Pohl Valero, Stefan (2010). "Termodinámica, pensamiento social y biopolítica en la España de la Restauración" [Thermodynamics, social thought and biopolitics in Restoration Spain] (PDF). Universitas humanística (in Spanish) (69). Pontificia Universidad Javeriana: 35–60. ISSN 0120-4807.
- Puerto, Francisco Javier (1995). "Laureano Calderón y Arana (1847-1895)" [Laureano Calderón y Arana (1847-1895)] (PDF). El Ateneo: revista científica, literaria y artística (in Spanish) (6). Madrid: Ateneo de Madrid: 53–59. ISSN 0403-810X.
- Rodríguez Carracido, José (1894). "Una lección" [A lesson]. La Farmacia Moderna (in Spanish). 5 (10): 162. ISSN 0213-036X.
- Santos Ruiz, Ángel (1991). Retrospectiva Bioquímica: facultad de Farmacia de Madrid 1886-1986». Discurso de Ingreso en la Rea Academia de Medicina [Biochemical Retrospective: Faculty of Pharmacy of Madrid 1886-1986. Inaugural Speech at the Royal Academy of Medicine] (in Spanish). Madrid: Real Academia Nac. Medicina.
- Sequeiros San Román, Leandro (2004). "Calderón Arana, Laureano". In Manuel Silva Suárez (ed.). El Ochocientos: de las profundidades a las alturas [The 1800s: from the depths to the heights] (PDF) (in Spanish). Vol. 7. Real Academia de Ingeniería, Institución Fernando el Católico y Prensas de la Universidad de Zaragoza. pp. 391–392. ISBN 84-7820-814-3. Archived from the original (PDF) on 14 June 2015.
- Siboni, Luis (1892). "Variedades. Calderón y Arana (D. Laureano)" [Varieties. Calderón y Arana (Mr. Laureano)]. La Farmacia Moderna (in Spanish). 3 (31): 496–499. ISSN 0213-036X.
- Sotelo, Ignacio (3 October 2013). "Rémoras en nuestra enseñanza" [Brakes on our teaching]. El País (in Spanish).
- Valle López, Ángela del (1998). Aportación bio-bibliográfica a la historia de la ciencia: Universidad Central, 1886-1902 [Bio-bibliographical contribution to the history of science: Central University, 1886-1902] (in Spanish). Narcea Ediciones. ISBN 978-84-2771-230-0.
