= Luis de Zulueta =

Spanish diplomat

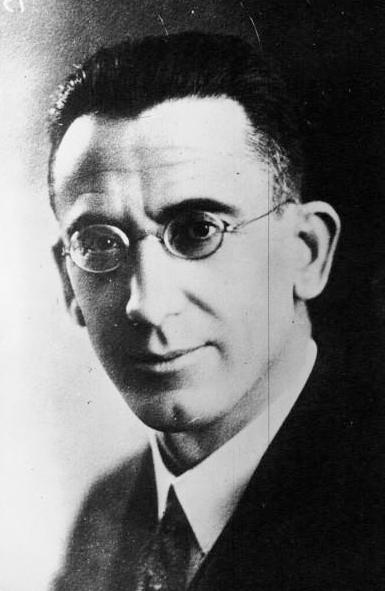

Personal details
- Born: 8 April 1878 Barcelona, Spain
- Died: 2 August 1964 (aged 86) New York City, United States
- Party: Reformist Republican Party; Republican Action
- Occupation: Politician, diplomat, professor, pedagogue, bank clerk, opinion writer

Luis de Zulueta y Escolano (1878–1964) was a Spanish Republican politician, pedagogue and diplomat. He was linked to the Institución Libre de Enseñanza. He served as Minister of State from 1931 to 1933, during the Second Republic.

== Biography ==
Born on 8 April 1878 in Barcelona to a well-off family, son of Juan Antonio Zulueta y Fernández and María Dolores Escolano y de la Peña. He was of Cuban descent on his father side and Gaditan on his mother side. Zulueta, a native Spanish speaker, never completely mastered the Catalan language. His father was a prominent lawyer, linked to the local banking industry. After his father died in 1894, Zulueta interrupted his education to work as bank clerk.

From 1903, he corresponded with Miguel de Unamuno who encouraged him to travel to Geneva and Paris. After a spell in Berlin, he returned to Spain in 1905. He was elected as Barcelona municipal councillor in 1905, on Alejandro Lerroux's Fraternidad Republicana platform. But he left the party and moved away from Barcelona. He met Francisco Giner de los Ríos (founder and leading figure of the Institución Libre de Enseñanza), for whom he served as interlocutor until 1910, as Giner de los Ríos sought to cultivate the cultural and political bridges between Barcelona and Madrid. After starting studies in Philosophy and Letters at the University of Salamanca, he earned the licentiate degree from the Central University in Madrid in 1906. He later earned a PhD from the same centre in 1910; his dissertation was La pedagogía de Rousseau y la educación de las percepciones de espacio y de tiempo ("Rousseau's pedagogy and the education of the perceptions of space and time").

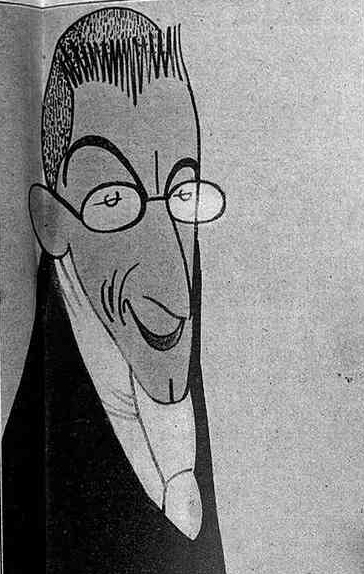
Zulueta, caricaturised by Bagaria (1911)

He was attracted by the Republican-Socialist Conjunction in 1910. Linked to the Institución Libre de Enseñanza, Zulueta joined the Republican Reformist Party led by Gumersindo de Azcárate by 1914. His political ideas oscillated in between regenerationism, the left wing, and a moderate liberalism. He became an opponent of Marxism–Leninism. In 1910, he was appointed as lecturer of the Central University, where he later obtained the chair of Pedagogy.

Over the next 13 years, Zulueta was elected three times to the Congress of Deputies, representing Barcelona (1910), Madrid (1919), and Redondela (1923).

He was one of the intellectuals who signed the Manifesto for the Unión Democrática Española para la Liga de la Sociedad de Naciones Libres ("Spanish Democratic Union for the Society of the League of Free Nations"), published in 1918.

The Spanish Second Republic was proclaimed in April 1931, and Zulueta was proposed as Ambassador to the Holy See by the Provisional Government. His nomination was endorsed by Francisco Vidal y Barraquer, Archbishop of Tarragona, and by Federico Tedeschini, the Apostolic Nuncio to Spain. But the Vatican rejected the Agrément because he was a disciple of Giner de los Ríos. He was elected to the Constituent Cortes in the June 1931 election from Badajoz.

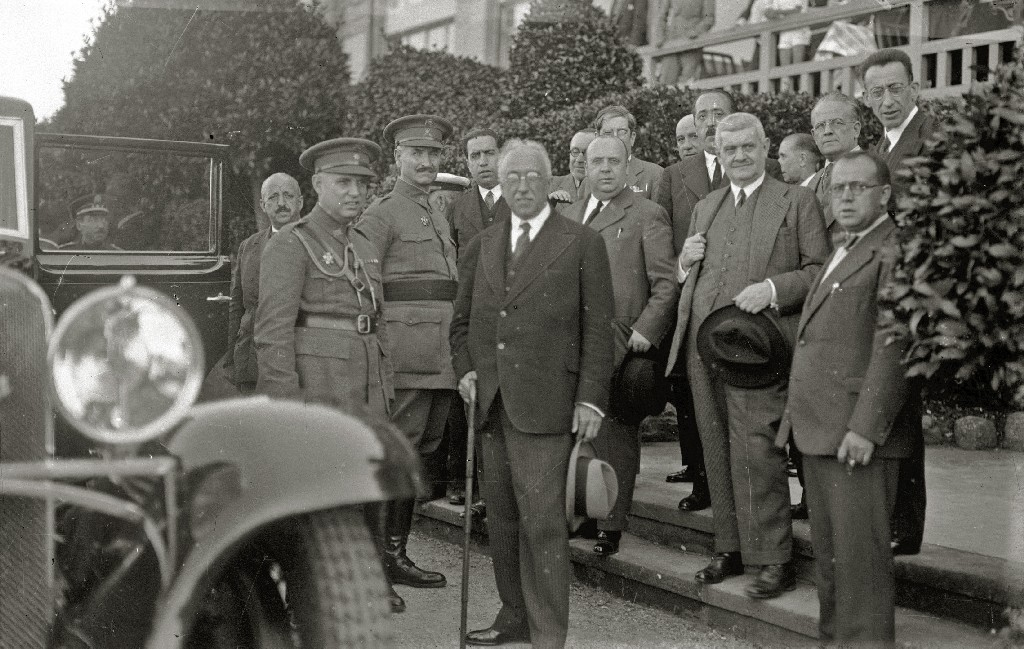
Zulueta (upper right) accompanying Niceto Alcalá Zamora during a visit to San Sebastián in 1932.

Following the exit of Lerroux's Radical Republican Party from the government in December 1931, prime minister Manuel Azaña replaced Lerroux as Minister of State (foreign affairs) with Zulueta, even though he was not a member of Azaña's Acción Republicana ("Republican Action") party. replacing Alejandro Lerroux. Zulueta left the ministry in June 1933, and was made Ambassador to Nazi Germany, where he served for only three months. Years later, he wrote a memoir of his time in Berlin, Mis recuerdos del Führer (1954), leaving a portrait of Adolf Hitler and the pervasive manipulation techniques of Nazism.

The rightist parties won the 1933 election, and Azaña left office. Zulueta then finally joined Acción Republicana.

When the left parties won the 1936 general election, he was again appointed Ambassador to the Holy See, and this time the Vatican accepted him.

After the Spanish Civil War began in July 1936, Fascist Italy recognized the Nationalist rebels as the government of Spain, and they took control of the Palazzo di Spagna (the Spanish embassy building in Rome). Zulueta had resided there; he was expelled and went into exile in Paris. He was later offered refuge in Colombia by President Eduardo Santos. There he collaborated with the Liberal newspaper El Tiempo and also worked for the Universidad Nacional, the Escuela Normal Superior, the Instituto Pedagógico Nacional, and the University of the Andes.

He moved to the United States in 1960, and died in New York City on 2 August 1964.

Government offices
Preceded by Alejandro Lerroux	Minister of State; 1931–1933	Succeeded by Fernando de los Ríos
