= Laureano Figuerola =

Spanish lawyer, economist and politician

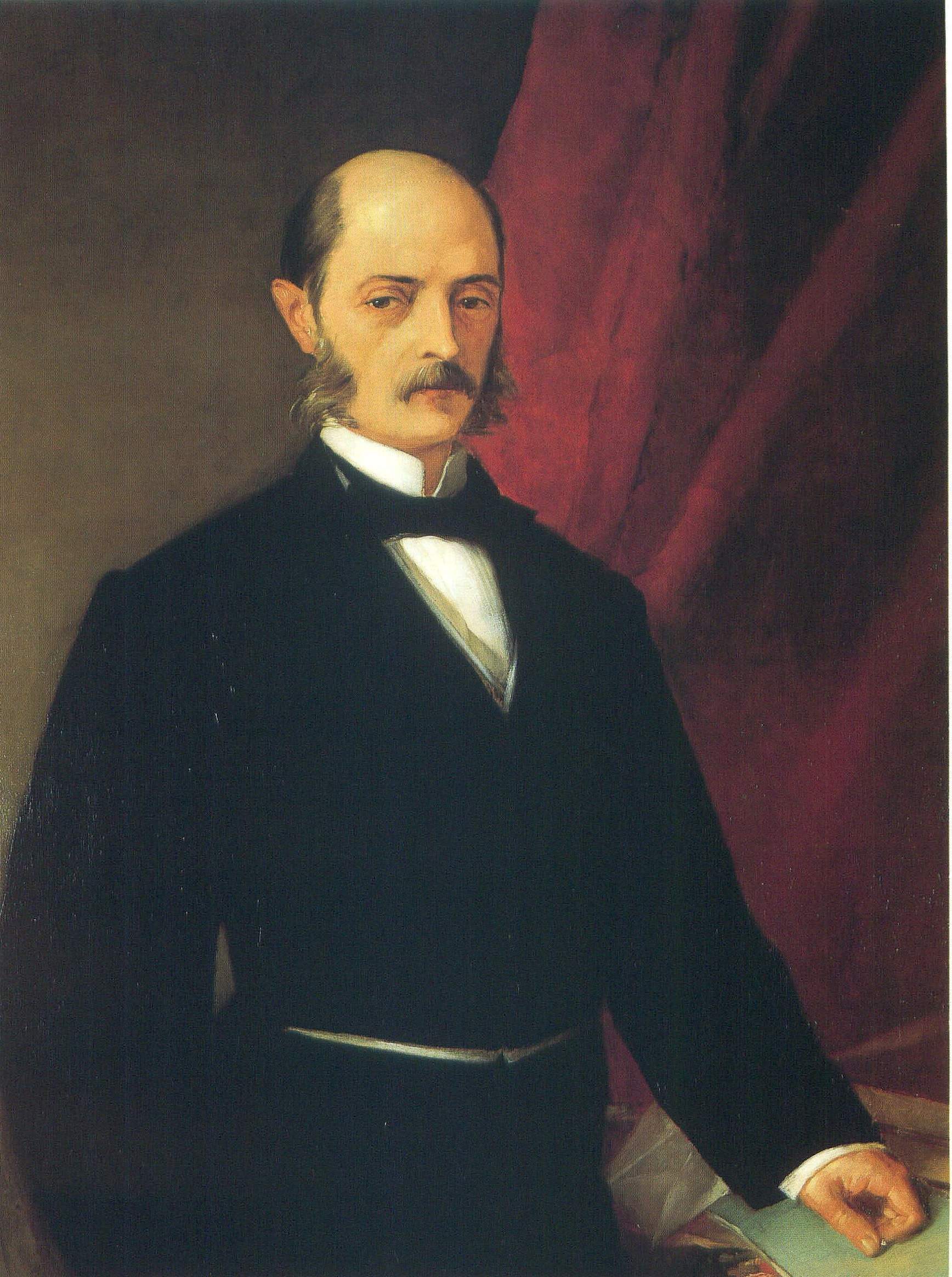
Laureano Figuerola: portrait by Eduardo Balaca

Laureano Figuerola y Ballester (4 July 1816, in Calaf – 28 February 1903, in Madrid) was a Spanish lawyer, economist and politician who served as minister of finance during the Sexenio Democrático. He is best known for officially establishing the peseta as Spain's currency.

== Biography ==
After completing his studies In philosophy, he took a Bachelor's degree in Law in 1838, then received his doctorate from the University of Barcelona in 1840. He became a substitute professor of constitutional law there and, in 1845, was promoted to Professor of Administrative Law and Political Economics. In 1853, he became a Professor of Political Economics and Law at the Central University of Madrid.

Four years later, he became one of the first members of the Real Academia de Ciencias Morales y Políticas (RACMP) and, together with several associates, including José Echegaray and Segismundo Moret, was a founder of the "Sociedad Libre de Economía Política", an organization devoted to the principles of free trade.

After the Revolution of 1868, The Duke of the Tower, head of the Provisional Government, appointed him Minister of Finance, a position he held until early the following year. One of his most important acts was signing the ordinance establishing the peseta as the sole official currency. He headed the same ministry from late 1869 until 1870, when Amedeo I ascended to the throne.

His position in the Cortes had become difficult during his second term as minister, due to opposition from Pi y Margall and others, including businessmen in the industrial sector. Despite the support of his friend, Juan Prim, he felt it was best to tender his resignation.

He was then elected President of the Board of Directors for the Institución Libre de Enseñanza, created by Royal Decree in 1876. He was also one of the first members of the Faculty Board, together with Nicolás Salmerón, Joaquín Costa and Francisco Giner de los Ríos, among others. In 1885, he was elected a Councillor (alderman) for the City Council of Madrid. From 1898 until his death, he served as President of RACMP.

== Sources ==
- "Laureano Figuerola en el campo del honor" by Francisco Cabrillo.
- Alberto Rull Sabater: Diccionario sucinto de Ministros de Hacienda (s.XIX-XX), 1991: Madrid. Instituto de Estudios Fiscales
- Miguel Martorell Linares and Francisco Comín: “Laureano Figuerola: el ministro de Hacienda de la Revolución Gloriosa”, in: Francisco Comín, Pablo Martín-Aceña and Rafael Vallejo (eds.): La Hacienda por sus ministros. La etapa liberal de 1845 a 1899, Zaragoza, PUZ, 2006, pp. 299–339, ISBN 84-7733-779-9
