= Ricardo Rubio =

Spanish Pedagogue

Ricardo Rubio (February 13, 1856 — April 30, 1935), was a Spanish pedagogue, professor of Botany, and Spanish education manager. He was very close friend and right hand of Manuel Bartolomé Cossío in the governing and administrative board of the Institución Libre de Enseñanza. Twice director of the ILE Bulletin, his silent task style "was essential for the functioning of the gears of the foundation and the realization of their pedagogical projects".

== Life ==
Born in Navalcarnero, a town in the province of Madrid, Ricardo was one of the two sons of Juan de Nepomuceno Rubio Pérez and Micaela Álvarez de Linera and Benito. He studied law at the former Central University of Madrid. Rubio was one of the strongest collaborators in the Cossío team, both in the secretariat of the National Pedagogical Museum and in the set of projects of the ILE. As an institutionalist secretary, in addition to directing the Bulletin in two periods, between 1904 -1910 and 1917–1934. He participated actively in the organization and coordination of the circulating libraries and the first school colony made by the Institution. He occupied the subadministration of the Pedagogical Museum after the death of Cossío.Manuel Bartolomé Cossío

In 1895 he joined in civil marriage with Isabel Sama Pérez, sister of the also institutionalist and friend Joaquín Sama, with whom he had two children, Manuel and Micaela. Isabel occupied the vacant position in the Board of the ILE after the death of her husband. He died in Madrid.
