= Rafael Torres Campos =

Spanish geographer

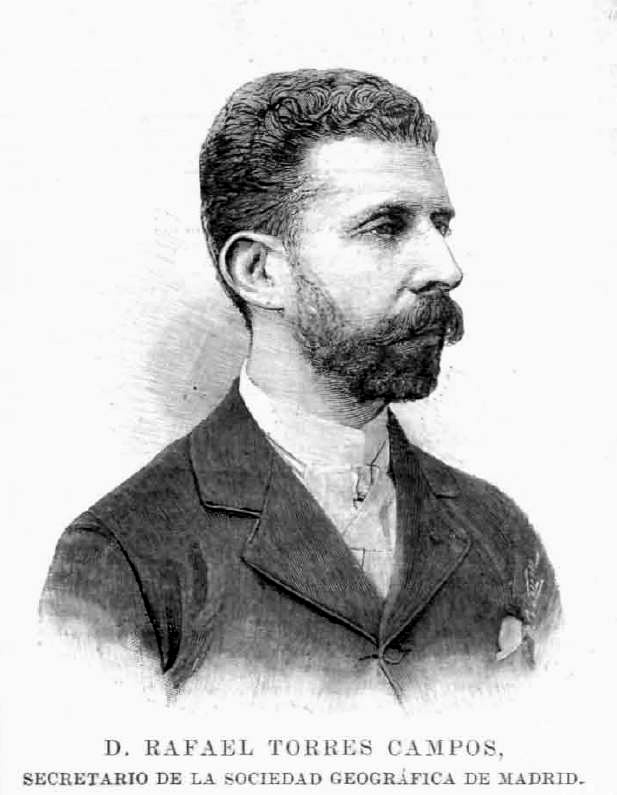
- Rafael Torres Campos in 1892
- Born: 1853; Almería, Spain
- Died: 1904 (aged 50–51); Paris, France
- Occupation: Geographer

Rafael Torres Campos (1853–1904) was one of the most important Spanish geographers at the end of the 19th century. His work in Spanish geography was particularly relevant because it introduced modern currents of European and American geography into Spain. His dedication to teaching led to the creation of a sophisticated group of geographical educators whose influence, although difficult to measure, has extended to the present. Because of his close links with people and institutions of a progressive character his work has been completely neglected: these pages are dedicated to a late but necessary recuperation of his reputation.

== Education, life and work ==
Torres Campos was born in 1853 in Almería in southern Spain, where he completed his primary and secondary education. At the age of sixteen, when he had completed these studies, he moved to Madrid, following in the footsteps of his older brother to read law at the Central University of Madrid. This first stay in the capital was to profoundly affect his life and later work. This was a time of intense social and political agitation and cultural developments. He arrived in Madrid in 1868, the very year of the September revolutions which precipitated the setting up of the First Spanish Republic. He thus became fully aware of the problems that affected his country.

At the same time, his studies at the university brought him into contact with the philosophy of the Krausists, which, having entered the Spanish scientific panorama in the previous decades, was at this time was having a deep influence on young Spanish students. This philosophy, which represented a complete break with the prevailing Scholastic tradition, was the key to later Spanish Liberalism. The philosophy was to aim at a social and ethical reform in its search for the 'human ideal' with special reference to the possibility of a new and revolutionary pedagogy along the lines of Jean-Jacques Rousseau, Johann Heinrich Pestalozzi and Friedrich Fröbel, using as a background a "harmonic rationalism" of idealist origin. Its basic tenets, once freed from their initial dogmatism and imbued with the methods of the new Positivism, were taken up and never abandoned by Torres Campos.

Especially important to an understanding of his work is the friendship of Torres Campos during these years with a number of the teachers in the Law Faculty, foremost inheritors of the philosophical system described above, which came increasingly to colour his subsequent aspirations and activities. Such was the case with Fernando de Castro, rector of the Central University of Madrid and instigator of the education of women in Spain; likewise with Francisco Giner de los Ríos who, having been dismissed from his chair of Law in 1875 because his opposition to the government's education policies, founded, as a way to preserve the freedom of science, an Institute of Free Education, of which Torres Campos became a member and into which he channeled a part of his teaching activity.

The manifold threats to the republican regime at this time necessitated obligatory military service, which forced Torres Campos to leave the university in 1873, by which time he was assistant lecturer to the chair of Public Deeds and Judicial Proceedings. He willingly accepted this imposition, given his deep republican convictions evidenced during this period, and did so by sitting the entrance examination for the recently created 'Military Administration Corps,' a competition held among young academics and in which Torres Campos came first. It was here that, after a very short training period, he first came into contact with geography, a fact which he was to record years later in the prologue to his book Estudios Geográficos (Geographical Studies).

"Appointed as a teacher in the School of Military Administration towards the beginning of my career, I was hoping, given my recently completed legal studies, to be given a class in Law. The assignment of the Teachers' Committee brought me to Geography, and in preparation for this role I turned to his book Geografía Histórico-Militar de España [Historico-Military Geography of Spain] (referring to a work by José Gómez de Arteche). The excellence of this work, the pure and sober way in which the author describes the accidents and peculiarities of our country, the well-considered account given of the influence of surroundings on human acts, the depth and originality of his historico-military observations, fired my imagination and lead me to make geography, as understood in this book, my chosen field." (Torres, 1895, p. III)

During 1876 whilst Torres Campos was staying in Avila both the Sociedad Geográfica de Madrid (Madrid Geographical Society) and the Institución Libre de Enseñanza (The Institute of Free Teaching) were founded. He was to become a member of both societies during the following year. The former gave him contact with the most significant contemporary geographers of Spain, men such as Coello, Ibañez, Fernández Duro, Valle, whilst the latter involved him in a new closer relationship with the Liberal thinkers. Like the aforementioned Giner de los Ríos, these Liberals had abandoned the universities, of their own volition or compelled to do so because of their support for the incipient movement to obtain a new, rigorous and undogmatic educational system in Spain. He began his activities in the Institute of Free Teaching preparing a Doctorate in Law and reading the preparatory courses for Medicine. He divided his time between this and his role as secretary of the institute.

His new post, allied with his willingness to travel and good-natured character led him to represent the Institute at The Universal Exhibition of Science, Arts and Letters, held in Paris during the summer of 1878. Whilst there he attended seminars given by the geographer Emile Levasseur on the geography teaching methodology that he had been developing in France during the Third Republic. Torres Campos' interest in the culturally eclectic contents of the Exhibition was clearly demonstrated by the diverse nature of his first articles published in the Boletín de la Institución Libre de Enseñanza [Bulletin of the Institute of Free Education]: “El presupuesto de Instrucción Pública en Francia” [The Budget for Public Instruction in France], and “La porcelana en la Exposición de París” [Porcelain at the Paris Exhibition].

However, despite his eclecticism, Torres Campos' attention remained focussed on geographical teaching methodology. In parallel with the Institutionalists, Torres Campos was seeking an educational system which would be both personalised and practical, and would incorporate lectures, smaller seminar groups and laboratory work. He returned to Spain with a variety of geological sections, relief models, a geographical clock, and the principles of the savings bank project. In addition, he brought back to Spain the idea of student field excursions soon put into practice by the Institute of Free Teaching, which was to be described in The Times of October 1884 as “using them more than any other European school”. Torres Campos was to dedicate a pamphlet, Viajes Escolares [School Field Trips], to this very subject.

The idea of student field excursions were becoming increasingly important in the formation of the institute's educational programmes for the possibilities they offered of an 'intuitive' understanding of the objects of physical and human studies. The profound faith of its members in the seemingly enormous educational potential of these methods led them to organise the First National Congress of Pedagogy, with the aim of expounding and propagating excursionista educational theories. Torres Campos, in his position as director of field trips, was an active participant in the organisation.

In 1879 he was elected associate secretary of the Madrid Geographical Society. One of his first assignments in this organisation was the editing of the “Reseñas de las tareas y estado de la Sociedad” [Summary of Works and the Current State of Society], a work which argued that geographical studies should be more closely related to the political, social and economic problems of the country, laying special emphasis on colonial questions. His work on this led him to organise in 1883, together with other geographers such as J. Costa and F. Coello, a congress entitled Colonial and Mercantile Geography Congress. This group also founded the Society of Africanists and Colonialists which was to become a year later the Commercial Geography Society. He edited its journal—Revista de Geografía Comercial [Geographical and Commercial Review]—, writing, amongst many other articles, in collaboration with Joaquín Costa, the introductory article of this review, entitled “La Geografía y el Comercio” [Geography and Commerce].

In 1882 he was, partly from economic necessity and perhaps more importantly out of a genuine desire to propagate his pedagogical theories, to sit the civil service examinations for the position of lecturer at the Escuela Normal Central de Maestras [The Central Women's Teacher Training College]. He was at this time being somewhat poorly paid to give classes in commercial geography at the Asociación para la Enseñanza de la Mujer [Association for Women's Education], an organisation dependent on the Central Women's Teacher Training College. He obtained the lectureship, and along with other lecturers busied himself with pedagogical theory, undertaking the structural and methodological innovations in their teaching. They introduced technical subjects and greater emphasis was placed on the role of geographical knowledge. This is the phase described in the long publication of 1884 as La reforma en la enseñanza de la mujer y la reorganzacion de la Escuela Normal Central de Maestras [The reform of the teaching of women and the reorganization of the Central Women's Teacher Training College].

Meanwhile, the importance of his works for the Geographical Societies were becoming more widely recognised and as a result they were chosen to be presented, in 1889, at the Fourth Paris International Geographical Congress, a congress of a kind which had not been held for years due to Europe's colonial problems, as a result of which even at the 1889 congress few nations were represented. The result being that the conference was overridingly French in character, with great emphasis being placed on the most recent trends in French geographical thought, chiefly that of regional geography. Torres Campos was deeply impressed by all he saw and heard, perhaps even more so as one of the principal backers of the congress, Paul Vidal de la Blache, was playing a very active role in its development. From this time Torres Campos became one of the principle Spanish exponents of regional geography, taking full advantage of the means of expression of the Geographical Societies and the Institute of Free Teaching.

He represented Spain at the Berne International Congress of 1891 continuing to be a receptive participant, focussing now on new developments in geography coming from Europe and America, which appear, together with his reports of the Paris proceedings and lengthy articles on colonialism, slavery and emigration, in his book Estudios Geográficos [Geographical Studies] The congress awarded him first prize in its education section for his presentation on the educational achievements and innovations of the Institute of Free Teaching.

Torres Campos also represented Spain at the Fourth International Geographical Congress, held during 1895 in London. This formed the basis of his book “La Geografia en 1895. Memoria sobre el Congreso Internacional de Ciencias Geograficas Celebrado en Londres” [Geography in 1995. An Account of the International Congress of Geographical Sciences held in London], as well as of numerous articles in various Spanish magazines.

He also participated during 1892 in the Second National Congress of Pedagogy and the National Congress of Spanish-Portuguese-American Geography. At these he presented papers on women's education and Spanish colonialism respectively, the latter of which he compared in its development with Anglo-Saxon colonialism in California. He was commissioned by the Ministry of War to travel in Italy and Austria-Hungary, where he visited various schools of geography; from these he collected much important information, allowing him to undertake his “Memoria sobre el progreso de los trabajos geográficos” [Notes on the Progress of Geographical Work] which, until his death in 1904, he edited for the Bulletin of the Sociedad Geográfica de Madrid, in his capacity as secretary general. In it these he presented the latest developments in geographical knowledge and in its diverse specialist fields of volcanology, seismics, glaciology and oceanology.

Towards the end of his life and after active contribution to the war effort during the Hispano-Cuban conflict of 1898, in charge of the purchase of provisions from France and Germany, he gave geography classes in the chair created for this purpose in the Scientific and Literary Atheneum of Madrid. In a course of lectures entitled “Los Pueblos de Asia” [The People of Asia] he displayed his wide and scholarly knowledge of history. His life and works fully merited the honour bestowed on him when, in 1901, he was named as a member of the Royal Academy of History.

== Scientific ideas, geographical thought ==
Torres Campos' concept of the world and his geographical thought were markedly shaped and influenced primarily by his contact with Krausist philosophy, and by extension through his close links with the Institute of Free Teaching.

According to the author, in line with the Institute of Free Teaching, geography constituted educational knowledge both as a means of individual ethical education and as a form of social education. It represented a personal education in so far as the contact with 'the geographical', 'nature' and 'landscape', reveals the ethical code of human behavior, «broadens ones ideas and gives us an accurate picture of our situation and value in the world, researching the physical, topographical and ethnological factors which influence the march of humanity and its progress, »; and a social education in that it «is, moreover—continues Torres Campos—a science which guides the practical evolution of peoples, works towards a resolution of social problems and teaches us how to obtain the maximum from the planet.» (Torres, 1985, p. 263).

His preoccupation with expressing a geographical methodology in a renewed form led him to abandon the manuals and to work «from things and not from words and complex terminology learned parrot-fashion, a field trip is worth more than many lessons.» (Torres, 1882, p. 9). It was on this basis that the Institute of Free Teaching introduced into its educational methods student excursions and study trips, using theories that had been acquired by Torres Campos during his visits to Paris. These additional methods made it possible to combine scientific theory with ethical and aesthetic aspects thereby giving the subject a deeper reality which it had previously lacked and in turn propagating profounder relationships between teacher and pupil and among the pupils themselves, once one came to understand in situ the institutions and social organization of a nation, without neglecting the aesthetic aspect of education.

«...more than merely complementary to studies, they [field trips] are becoming an educative process; the Institución is trying to make them a normal and frequent part of life, so that our nation may know itself and understand others (......), playing a vital part in the development of the personality and the formation of character. Learning to appreciate circumstances, acquiring the necessary flexibility and to adapt to them, always with discretion and tact, education, in a word, for social interaction, requires experience acquired only with difficulty when we are constantly surrounded by people who think and live in the same way.». (Torres, 1882. pp. 23–24).

«So that education does not become exclusive and so that industrialization does not harden the heart and create generations indifferent to spiritual matters, it is important not to forget the ideal and aesthetic side of education, to place it alongside the utilitarian. One normally seeks to inspire a sense of beauty through the Classics, arousing as they do noble sentiments, a taste for literature and art, yet exclusively and narrowly. We pursue the same end through more comprehensive artistic studies which embrace the beautiful in every sphere and in every age.......». (Ibidem, p. 33).

Once students have observed and 'intuited' reality through direct contact theory comes to play a complementary role. For such classes Torres Campos devised a Mapa mudo [map without words] of the Iberian peninsula in slate-covered cardboard, possibly the first of its kind in Spain, and brought back from his journeys throughout Europe a wide range of maps and geological sections. In later years and with the same dedication he produced a Colección de Mapas Murales [Collection of Map Murals] in collaboration with P. Vidal de la Blanche.

As well as its educational aspects Geography should help in the reorganisation of the diverse functions of national and international bodies. Torres Campos dedicated himself to this through the Geographical Society of Madrid, in whose name repeated petitions were sent to the Government demanding reform of the curriculum and the introduction of chairs of Geography.

«If Spain does not shortly bring reforming intentions to bear on this matter -commented Torres Campos—if we stubbornly remain one of the countries which ignore Geography and persist with the status quo, then there will be no alternative but the existing harm and the present situation will remain unchanged. Few ministers will know which are our colonial possessions and thus concern themselves with our interests; it will not be possible to form opinions to shape a broad foreign policy and in turn to motivate the search outside Spain for the resources and elements of prosperity that we lack here. There will be a dearth of administrators able to govern and make colonies productive, as there will be of traders and industrialists who could manage their affairs more prosperously, understanding of the complex and sometimes very obscure factors at work in the world and on which today depend prosperity or ruin. An increasingly noticeable weakness, incapacity and impoverishment will be the natural consequence and deserved punishment for our delay and ignorance.» (Torres, 1895, p. 262).

It will come as no surprise, then that Torres Campos, in keeping with these ideas, participated actively in colonial affairs and tried to renew, stimulate and extend the teachings of geography, both through the methods followed by the Institute of Free Teaching and by introducing into Spain ideas already in practice in other countries. His participation in the colonial arena was by way of specific proposals, in which his Krausist inheritance can be clearly seen.

«In all civilisations—stated Torres Campos—, the customs and practices of whichever people however barbaric or backward they may seem, are healthy and are a natural consequence of the environment and conditions of the race, which should not be uprooted. It is worth correcting deviation, opposing any denials of the laws fundamental to human life, exercising a certain guidance; but this without making the inferior people an image and likeness of the more civilised one, keeping in mind the aim that it should develop normally, taking from the civilisation with which it comes into contact those things which are useful or potentially useful to it, in a natural way, by free and autonomous movement. The change should be slow and gradual, without suggesting a radical transformation, rejecting the arbitrary ideal of total assimilation. In short, a colonising people must provide conditions and create stimuli to enable the savages to grow nearer to the former's civilisation, but without imposing the progress in one fell swoop using canons and guns.» (Ibidem p. 119.)

So Torres Campos realised that if on the one hand that the environment influences the development of humanity, on the other man can modify the environment and use his own means to reach an Ideal de la Humanidad para la vida [Model Humanity for life]. As preached by Krause/Sanz del Río:

«Any fluvial civilisation—insists Torres Campos–unless it is to perish or to be absorbed into by a broader current, must evolve into a maritime civilisation, communicative and expansive. At first it makes contact with inland seas, the Mediterranean phase; then it reaches the wider context of a great ocean; finally comes the discovery and exploitation of new countries, their colonialization and the development of high speed communication with every important ocean, with which opens the universal period and commerce and a maritime way of life become general throughout the civilisation.» (Torres, 1904, p. 31.)

The problem consisted in having the knowledge and ability to colonise in accordance with the strong nationalistic ideology extant in Europe, and defining the role of Spain and the Latin race of people in this process. Thus the importance attributed to'the historical sciences, to anthropology and ethnography.

«If the Latin race is to spread and multiply—commented Torres Campos in 1899—it is to occupy a considerable space on the globe and to number hundreds of millions, creating, in future ethnical trends within the human race, a healthy balance to the Saxons, Slavs and the Chinese—vigorous and expansive peoples par excellence—France must give way to our colonialists, Portugal must preserve the glorious legacy of her explorers, the two Iberian nations must be able to give scope to this population which, more than any other, can transmit by its tongue its own genius and leave, wherever in the world it treads, the mark of its enduring influence.» (Torres, 1895, p. 80).

== Influence and Spread of Ideas ==
There is no doubt that if there was no modification of the role of geography in the national curriculum during the last twenty years of the nineteenth century, this was in no way due to a lack of interest or effort on the part of pressure groups such as the Geographic Society of Madrid, some members of which occupied important political positions at this time. Nor were modifications not undertaken out of a lack of a coherent and articulate theoretical corpus, indeed, Torres Campos dedicated much effort to just such theories introducing repeatedly geography teaching methodology developed in other countries and the recommendations of the International Congresses on the subject.

The lack of reform seemed to be caused in part by the inertia of the academic community, its reluctance to accept any change, and secondly and more importantly by the rotational system of the political parties during the Restoration, when the opposition continually impeded any important changes that the reformists might have made. It was not until 1900, then, after the loss of the last overseas colonies and the subsequent political repercussions, that important changes were introduced into the national curriculum with the creation of chairs of geography. The long struggles by authors like Torres Campos seem diluted by time. In fact all the previous frustrated efforts, and continuous petitioning had prepared the ground. In this way 25 years after the introduction of excursionist methods, the use of maps without words and other modern techniques into geography teaching they finally began to be used generally and systematically.

Torres Campos was more successful with the introduction of the new currents in geographical thought, especially those originating in France, which with adaptations from one country to the other, became a school of thought whose influence can be traced to the present. The work of Torres Campos was therefore constant and anonymous, and as such unrecognised both in his time and ours.

== References on R. Torres Campos ==
The Geographer R. Beltran y Rózpide drafted a first bibliographical reference in the Diccionario enciclopédico hispano-americano de literatura, ciencias y artes, vol 21, (Barcelona 1897), 238–39; extending it in the successive appendices. The lawyer and sociologist A. Sela y Sampil stressed the personality and work of our author in an article published in La España Moderna, vol 14/158, Madrid (1902), 111–15, entitled “Un geógrafo español. Rafael Torres Campos” [A Spanish Geographer. Rafael Torres Campos]. After his death various commemorative pieces were written, concise and interesting are the words of F. Giner de los Ríos in the Boletín de la Institución Libre de Enseñanza, vol XXVIII, (Madrid 1904). The Army and Navy Centre dedicated to him by various authors a Velada Necrologica [Obituary], Madrid 1904, 47p.. Finally, the Royal Geographic Society held an 'Extraordinary Meeting' in his honour, published in the Boletín de la Real Sociedad Geográfica, vol. 47, (Madrid 1905), 117–203, and vol. 48, (1905), 361–71.

After a long period, Torres Campos' geographical work was rescued from oblivion by Nicolás Ortega Cantero in Estudios Turísticos (Madrid 1984), and by María Elena Hernández Sandoica, with reference to his involvement in colonial questions, Revista de la Universidad Complutense, (Madrid 1979). An article by José Antonio Rodríguez Esteban, an extract from his degree thesis, supervised by Josefina Gómez Mendoza of the Universidad Autónoma de Madrid, is to appear in the review Eria (Oviedo 1988), under the title "Rafael Torres Campos, 1853–1904, Geografía y educcacion a finales del s. XIX”. [Rafael Torres Campos, 1853–1904. Geography and Education in the Late Nineteenth Century], September 1987.

== Thematic Bibliography of Work by R. Torres Campos ==
a. Geographical Education: 1878 “Debate sobre los medios de propagar la enseñanza de la Geografía” [Debate on methods for the propagation of geography], Boletín de la Sociedad Geográfica de Madrid, vol. IV, 351. 1882 Viajes Escolares [School Field Trips], Madrid (Imprenta de Fortanet), 55pp. 1883 La enseñanza de la Geografía pór el método gráfico [Geographical teaching by the graphic method], París (1889). 1884 La reforma en la enseñanza de la mujer y la reorganzacion de la Escuela Normal Central de Maestras [The reform of the teaching of women and the reorganization of the Central Women's Teacher Training College], Madrid (Establecimiento Tipográfico de el Correo). 1892 “La enseñanza superior de la Geografía” [Geography Teaching in Higher Education], Boletín de la Intitución Libre de Enseñanza, vol. XVI, 321–24. 1893 “Ortografía geográfica” [Geographical Orthography], Boletín de la Intitución Libre de Enseñanza, vol. XVII, 250–52. 1893 “La enseñanza y el material de la Geografía en la Exposición de Berna” [Geographical teaching and materials at the Berne Exhibition]. Boletín de la Intitución Libre de Enseñanza, vol. XVII, 293–97; 327–34. 1894 Colección de mapas murales [Collection of Map Murals], in collaboration with P. Vidal de la Blache, París (Colín). 1898 “La enseñanza de la Geografía en el Congreso de Londres”, [Geographical teaching at the London Congress], Boletín de la Intitución Libre de Enseñanza, vol. XXII, 129–34; 161–69; 225–29.

b. Colonialism and Anthropological Geography. 1893 “La emigracion á América” [Emigration to America]. Paper presented at the Hispanic- Portuguese-American Geographical Congress of 1892, Madrid. 1895 Estudios geográficos [Geographical Studies], Madrid (Est. tip. de Fortanet), 463pp. Contents: “The campaign against slavery and Spain's duties in Africa”; “The Paris Geographical Congress and Exhibition, 1889”; “Portugal and England in Southern Africa”; “The Partition of Africa according to the latest treaties”; “The Problems of the Mediterranean”; “The Berne Geographical Congress and Exhibition”; “The Cuestion of Melilla”; “Our Rivers”; “Mountain memories, a journey to the Pyrenees”.

1901 Character de la conquista y colonización de las Islas Canarias [The Nature of the Conquest and Colonalization of the Canary Islands]. Discourse read in the Royal Academy of History, Madrid (Deposito de Guerra), 249pp. 1904 “Los Pueblos de Asia” [The Peoples of Asia], Boletín de la Intitución Libre de Enseñanza, vol. XXVIII, 25–32; 80–86.

c. Note on Geographical Publications: 1892 “El meridiano inicial y la hora universal en el Congreso de Geografía de Berna” [The Initial Meridian and Universal Time, at the Berne Congress of Geography], Boletín de la Intitución Libre de Enseñanza, vol. XVI, 55–59. 1897 “Estado presente de los estudios sobre Oceanografía” [The Present State of Oceanographic Studies], Boletín de la Intitución Libre de Enseñanza, vol. XXI, 157–60; 182–88. 1896–1904. “Memoria sobre el progreso de los trabajos geográficos” [Notes on the Progress of Geographical Work], 1896-97-98-1901-02-04, vols. XXXIX, XL, XLIV, XLVII. 1905 “Revista de Geografía: Bibliografía y Cartografía” [Journal of Geography; Bibliography and Cartography], Boletín de la Intitución Libre de Enseñanza, vol. XXIX, 340–50. 1906 “El vulcanísmo y la seismología” [Volcanology and Seismology], Boletín de la Intitución Libre de Enseñanza, vol. XXX, 18–31.

== Unpublished sources ==
The Royal Academy of History in Madrid has an archive of assorted letters and documents of Torres Campos. The Spanish Ministry of Science and Education also has the author's academic file and his personal curriculum (Legajo [Batch of Documents]4.457), with various documents showing the academic career of Torres Campos. The master's degree thesis cited above [see section one] contains a complete bibliography, demonstrating the interconnection between his work, the developments in Spanish geography and his personal vicissitudes.

== Chronology ==
1853 Born in Almería, south-east Spain, where he receives his primary and secondary education.

1868 Moves to Madrid to read law at the Central University.

1873 Has to give up his position as assistant lecturer to the chair of Public Deeds and Judicial Proceedings to enter the Military Administration Corps. Obtains first place in the entrance examinations.

1874 Gives Geography classes, as assigned by his army superiors.

1877 Becomes a member of the Institute of Free Teaching and the Geographical Society of Madrid.

1881 Marries Vitorina Balbás y González de Linares.

1882 Obtains the position of Lecturer in Humanities in the Women's Teacher Training College through competitive examination. There he organises wide reaching changes in teaching methods and organisation. Publishes Viajes Escolares [School Field Trips]

1885 Founds the Revista de Geografía Comercial in collaboration with F. Coello and J. Costa.

1889 First represents the Geographical Society of Madrid, at International Congresses of Geography; attends conferences in Paris, Berne, and London. He prepares important reports on these for various Spanish publications. In Paris and Berne he is presented with awards for his important contributions to the teaching of Geography.

1894-5 Publication of the Coleccion de Mapas Murales [Collection of Map Murals] in collaboration wit P. Vidal de la Blache, and a compilation of his works on Colonialism entitled Estudios Geográficos [Geographical Studies].

1896 Named Secretary General of the Geographical Society of Madrid with responsibility for the production of “Memoria sobre el progreso de los trabajos geográficos”[Notes on the Progress of Geographical Work], through which he introduces classical European and American Geography into Spain.

1901 Named Acedemico de Número in the Royal Academy of History for his work in the field of geography, archaeology and history.

1904 Died in Paris, 4, October, after a long illness.

== Sources ==
- Geographers: Biobibliographical Studies XIII, pp. 101–107: Rodriguez Esteban, José A. (1991): "Rafael Torres Campos (1853–1904). Life and Work".
- AA. VV.: “Reunión extraordinaria y sesión pública celebrada el día 31 de enero de 1905 en honra y memoria del Sr. D. Rafael Torres Campos, Secretario General que fue de la Sociedad”, Boletín de la Real Sociedad Geográfica, t. XLVII (1905), pp. 177–203, 361–371.
- Rodríguez Esteban, José Antonio: "Rafael Torres Campos (1853-1904). Geografía educadora y educación geográfica", ERÍA, Oviedo, nº 13 (1988), pp. 131–148.
- Rodríguez Esteban, José Antonio: "Rafael Torres Campos y el excursionismo geográfico", Boletín de la Real Sociedad Geográfica, t. CXXVI-CXXVII (1990–1991), pp. 223–283.
- Rafael Torres Campos: Diccionario Bibliográfico Español, in Real Academia de la Historia.
