= Manuel Bartolomé Cossío =

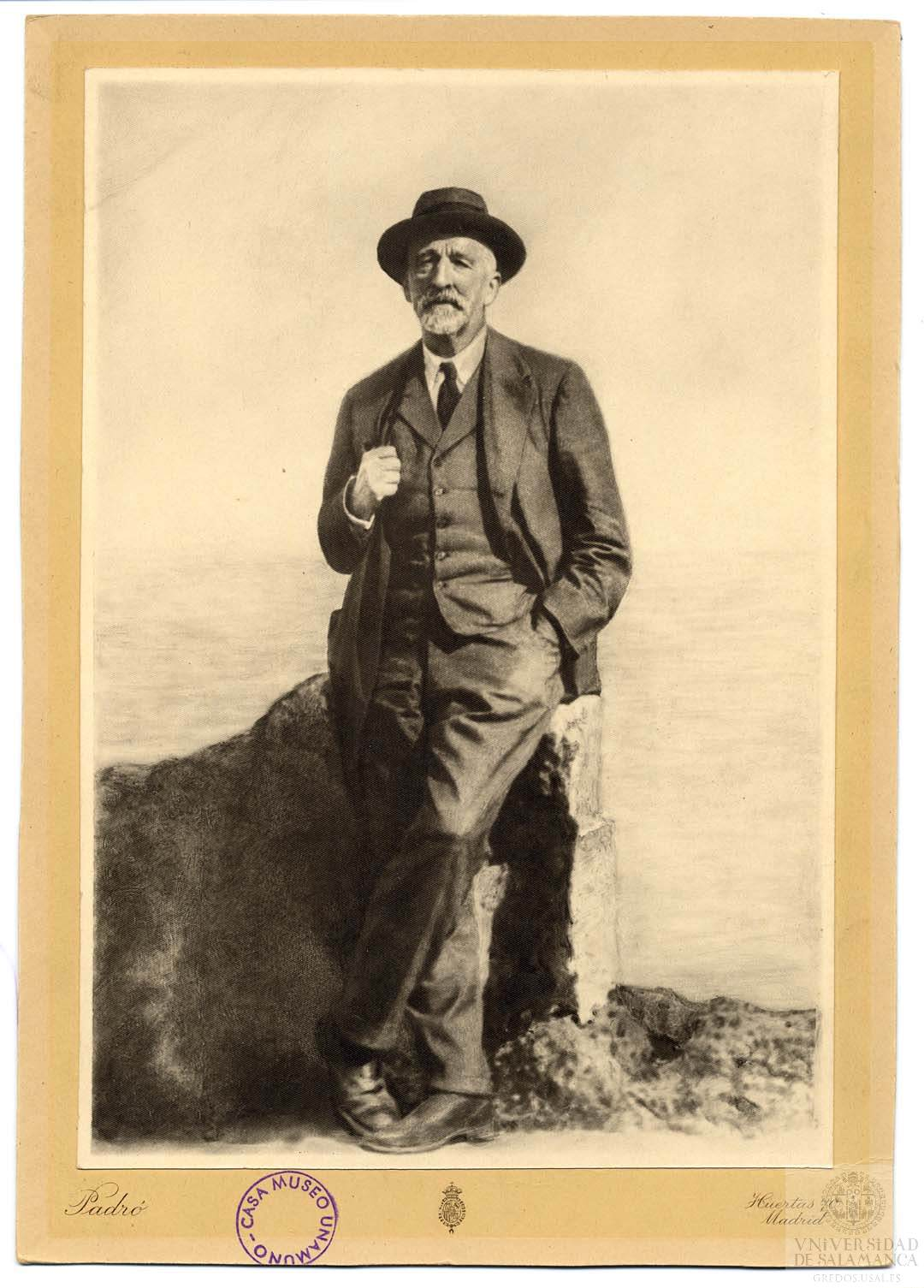
Cossío in 1920.

Manuel Bartolomé Cossío (22 February 1857 – 2 September 1935) was a Spanish art historian and Krausist teacher. Born in Haro, La Rioja, he entered the Institución Libre de Enseñanza, where he was the godson and favourite pupil of Francisco Giner de los Ríos as well as his inseparable companion and successor. He also wrote a monumental study of El Greco. He was director of the Museo Pedagógico Nacional and president of the Misiones Pedagógicas, becoming "the most eminent figure in Spanish pedagogy in the period 1882 to 1935", two years after his death. He died at Collado Mediano in Madrid.

== Biography ==
He was the son of Natalia Cossío Salinas and Patricio Bartolomé Flores, judge of the first instance in Haro. He spent part of his childhood in Aranda de Duero, Sepúlveda, and Arévalo (places that he will always evoke throughout his life).

=== Training ===
After passing through the Institute of Ávila, on September 8, 1868, he entered as a boarding student in the school of secular priests of El Escorial, receiving a rigid religious education; although the one who most impresses him is Father Mountain and his "philosophical-historical ideas". His period in El Escorial ended coinciding with the death of his father in May 1871, and in June he obtained his bachelor's degree from the Avila Institute . That autumn, orphaned and fourteen years old, he moved with his mother to Madrid, entering the Central University to study Philosophy and Letters and History of Fine Arts and Archaeology, where he made friends with a variety of classmates (Menéndez Pelayo, Leopoldo Alasand, especially with Joaquín Costa); On November 6, 1874, he obtained his bachelor's degree with an honors degree in History of Philosophy, without being able to pay the rights to the degree until 1904.

In the Spanish capital they had first settled in the house of their relative Flores Calderón and her husband and future brother-in-law Vicente Viqueira. Before 1877 there are no documents that give news of friendship with Giner (philosopher and Krausist pedagogue who would later become his teacher), although it is evident that Cossío had references and probable contacts with the philosopher when he attended Sunday classes at the University, where Giner also taught classes. Another possible link could be Riaño, also from Granada, and whose History of Fine Arts classes Cossío attended during the 1875-76 academic year.

When the Institución Libre de Enseñanza was founded on October 29, 1876, Cossío was one of its first students. That year, on November 6, his mother, Natalia Cossío, died, and the young institutionalist suddenly disappeared from Madrid, creating a misunderstanding that would take time to clear up. The death of his only sister a short time later forced Cossío to give himself completely to the ILE project, where he would soon join first as an assistant teacher and later as a primary school teacher. Between the summer of 1877 and November 1879 (the date of his departure for Bologna), Cossío and Giner established an intense relationship. After obtaining his doctorate in Philosophy and Letters, Cossío was sent by Giner to the Colegio de San Clemente in Bologna, where his brother had previously been.Hermenegildo Giner de los Rios .

Continuing his intense 'training period', in 1880 he attended courses in History, Art, Pedagogy and Philosophy at the University of Bologna. He was impressed by the Italian literature class of the poet Giosuè Carducci (although like many others he was annoyed to see him always "dirty and disheveled"), and he obtained a certificate in the School of Pedagogy and Anthropology of that University. He also had the opportunity to travel through Italy, Switzerland, France, Holland and Belgium . In Brussels, he participated in the International Congress of Education, where the Free Institution of Education was presented.on the international board. Back in Spain, he was substitute professor in the chair of History of Fine Arts, in the academic year 1881-1882 at the Higher Diplomatic School of Madrid; him continuing his classes at the Institution. That year, 1882, he was awarded the chair of Art History Theory at the Barcelona School of Fine Arts and visited Portugal .

In 1883 he won by opposition the direction of the Pedagogical Museum of First Education, later called the National Pedagogical Museum, founded the previous year, in which he would remain until his retirement in 1929. The initiatives of libraries and material are due to his dynamic conception of this institution. circulating school or school vacation camps. In 1885 he visited the sister Teaching Institution founded by Guillem Cifre de Colonya in Pollensa (Majorca). That same year, after attending Nicolás Salmerón 's Metaphysics course at the Central University, he received a doctorate in Philosophy and Letters.

In 1886 Cossío traveled commissioned by the Government to visit the main schools in France, Belgium, Holland and Great Britain; He was accompanied by Giner de los Ríos and a group of students from the ILE . That year he concluded his History of Spanish painting, which would not see the light of day until later.

In 1887 the National Pedagogical Museum inaugurated the first school colonies in San Vicente de la Barquera (Cantabria). In that same year, Cossío was appointed professor at the School of Higher Studies of the Madrid Athenaeum . In 1891 he obtained the title of Doctor of Philosophy and Letters.

=== Maturity ===
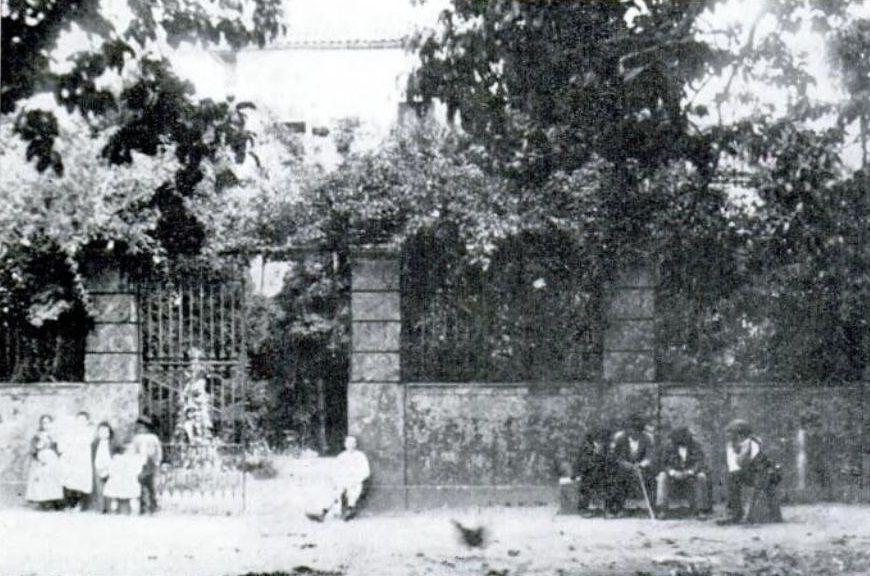
Quinta San Victorio (Bergondo, La Coruña).

On August 9, 1893, Bartolomé Cossío, thirty-six years old, married Carmen López Viqueira, twenty-seven years old, in the temple of Bom Jesús in Braga (Portugal). The marriage settled in the house on the Paseo del Obelisco very close to Giner and the 'third in discord', the inseparable common friend Ricardo Rubio, who very shortly after would unite civilly with Isabel Sama, sister of the also friend Joaquin Sama. Natalia, his first daughter, was born on September 1, 1894, in the house of San Victorio. In the fall of 1900, on November 27, their second daughter, Julia, was born; the joy of the fact would be clouded by the symptoms of mental disturbance, apparently of paternal inheritance, that Carmen, his wife, began to show and that worsened years later when a brain attack left their little daughter paralyzed the left half of her brain. Body.

In 1901 Cossío was entrusted with the chair of General Pedagogy at the National Pedagogical Museum . In 1904 he received the appointments of full professor of Superior Pedagogy of the Doctorate of Philosophy and Letters of the University of Madrid and delegate of Spain in the International Congress of Education of San Luis (United States). In 1905 he would give an important conference in Bilbao on "The teacher, the school and the teaching material", which laid the foundations for a renewal of the school in Spain.

In 1908 El Greco was published, a biography and artistic study which, in addition to providing new data and ordering its catalogue, led to a discovery of the figure and personality of the Greek-Spanish painter and its revaluation in the 20th century based on a different interpretation and innovative. Since then it has become the obligatory reference for any study on this painter.

That same year his friend, Joaquín Sorolla painted the two known portraits of Cossío. He also traveled to Pau (France), where his admired teacher Nicolás Salmerón had died .

In 1909 he was pensioned by the Board for Further Studies and Scientific Research and visited the most important educational centers in Germany and Switzerland. During this period, his daughters attend German schools, including the Pestalozzi-Fröebel-Haus in Berlin . In 1910 he traveled through Europe and in 1913 King Alfonso XIII interviewed Cossío as director of the National Pedagogical Museum. In 1914 he published What is known about the life of El Greco, on the occasion of the painter's centenary.

In 1915, after the death of his teacher, he fell ill. To recover, he settled first in El Escorial and then in Pozuelo de Alarcón . Carmen, his wife, had to be admitted to a psychiatric clinic. On August 4, 1917, Natalia, Cossío's eldest daughter, entered into a civil marriage with another active institutionist, Alberto Jiménez Fraud, who ran the Residencia de Estudiantes in Madrid.

=== Final years ===
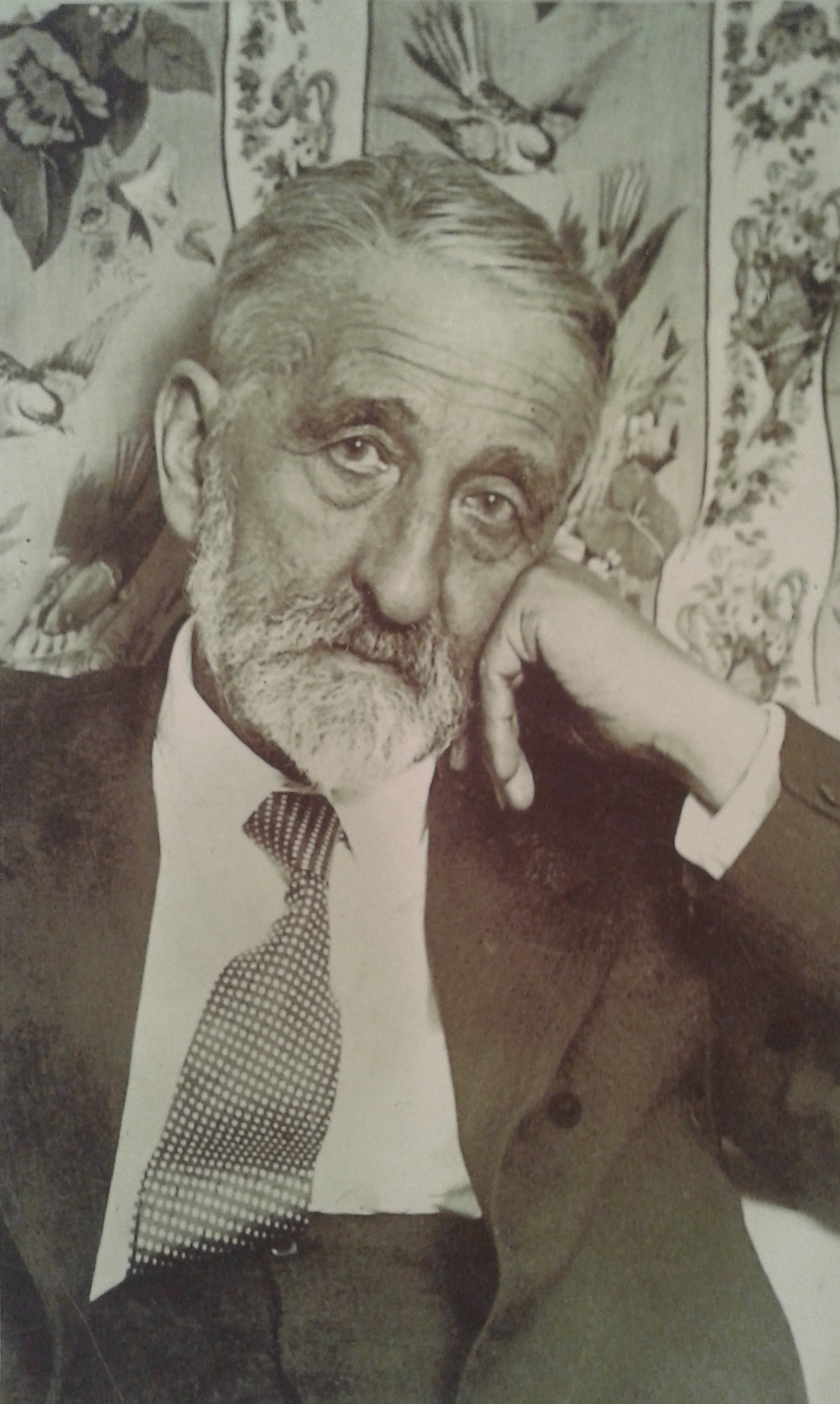
Cossío en 1931.

In 1926, during the celebration of the fiftieth anniversary of the Institución Libre de Enseñanza, Cossío, who had been appointed Minister of Public Instruction five years earlier, wrote (without signing it) the pedagogical program of the Institution. Finally in 1929 he retired and in tribute, his disciples published the book of his journey, with a compilation of his writings. On March 20, 1930, he was named honorary director of the National Pedagogical Museum .

One of his last satisfactions was the creation in Valencia of the " Cossío School ", 89 directed by José Navarro Alcácer and installed on Avenida 14 de Abril, a and whose classrooms were open from 1930 until the end of the war . Spanish civilian .

In that year Cossío fell ill and the following year he moved to Geneva (Switzerland) to undergo medical treatment, returning to Spain when the Republic was proclaimed, but in June he returned to Geneva. However, at that time (1931), the old teacher saw the old dream come true that Giner and he himself had matured over almost half a century: the start-up of the Pedagogical Missions, of whose patronage the Government would appoint him president. on May 29; and in June he is elected deputy to the General Constituent Courts by the Republican-Socialist coalition, but he cannot take office due to his advanced age and illness.

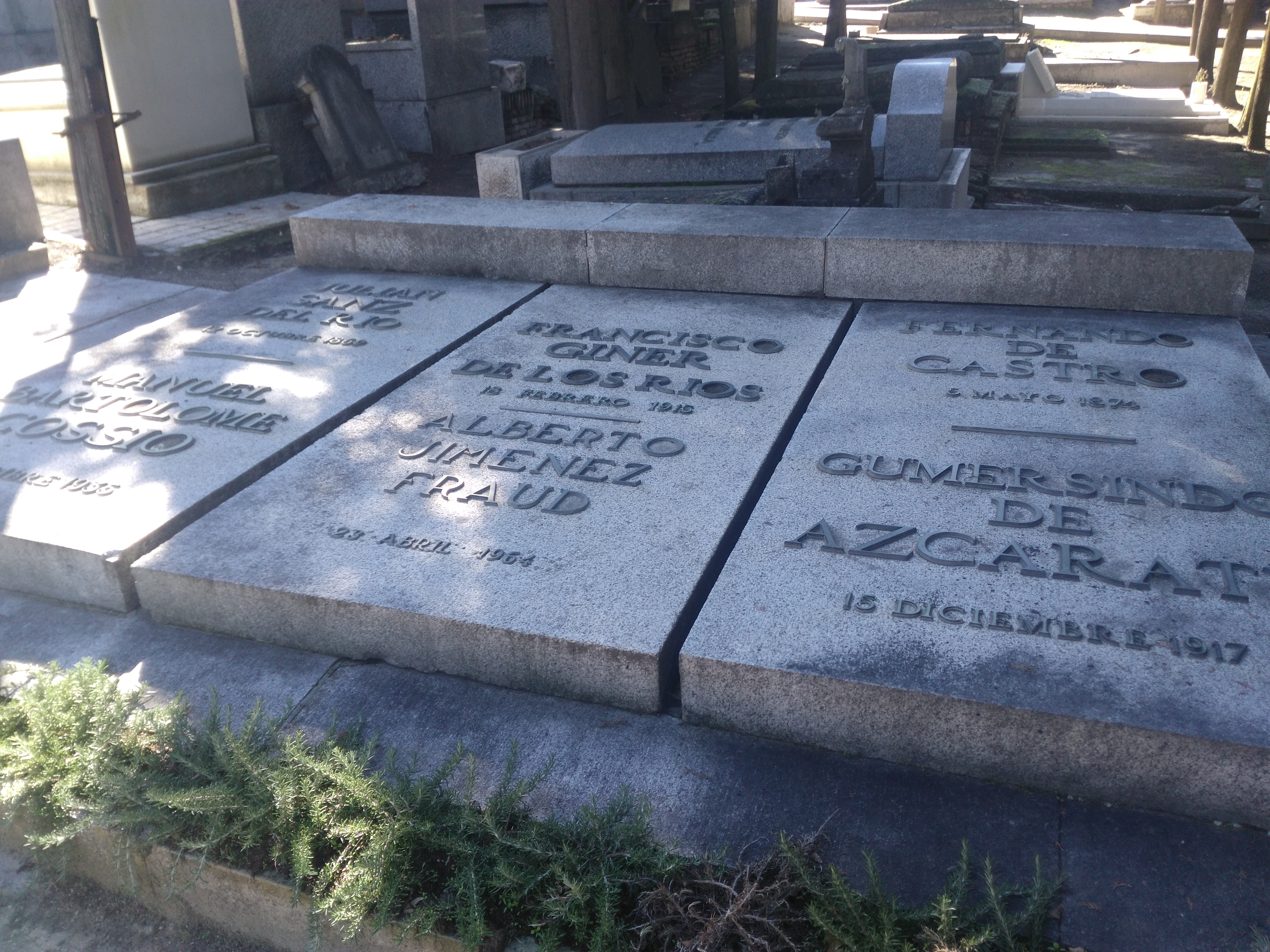
Tombs de Julián Sanz del Río, Manuel Bartolomé Cossío, Francisco Giner de los Ríos, Alberto Jiménez Fraud, Fernando de Castro and Gumersindo de Azcárate in the civil cemetery of Madrid.

He spent the summer of 1932 sick in Collado Mediano (Madrid). In 1934 he named Cossío, without consulting him, "Citizen of Honor" of the Republic. He died at two in the morning on September 2, 1935, at the age of seventy-eight. After his transfer to Madrid, he was buried in the Eastern Civil Cemetery and in the same grave as Julián Sanz del Río, Francisco Giner de los Ríos, Fernando de Castro y Pajares and Gumersindo de Azcárate.. After the burial, and following his express wish, a delegation composed of a crowd made up of recognized intellectuals and politicians, mixed with workers and students, among whom were the participants in the Pedagogical Missions, was dissolved without making any speeches.

== Work ==
"The whole world must be, from the first moment, an object of attention and a matter of learning for the child, as it continues to be, later for man. Teaching him to think about everything that surrounds him and to make his rational faculties active is to show him the path by which one goes to true knowledge, which is later used for life. Educate before instructing; make the child, instead of a warehouse, a cultivable field."

— Bartholomew Cossio

Of the incomprehensible task carried out by Bartolomé Cossío, we should list, as a guide, some of the reforms —of different magnitude and repercussion— that became a reality thanks to his efforts:

- In 1883, economic equality for male and female teachers, ahead of the rest of Europe.
- In 1886, an attempt was made to include the appropriations for primary education in the State budget and the creation of a specific Ministry of Public Instruction (which was not achieved until 1900 and 1901, respectively).
- In 1887: creation of school vacation colonies.
- In 1907: creation of a Board for the Promotion of National Education, parallel to the Board for the Extension of Studies (which degenerated into a bureaucratic body). That same year, creation of a normal degree for inspectors and normal teachers, which from the original approach, effective and modest, became a pompous Higher School of Teaching, inaugurated in 1909.
- In 1911, a proposal for a General Directorate of Primary Education, which was initially created with a technical nature and later became a political position.
- Orientation of the Pedagogical Missions from its initial approach to its materialization in 1932.
- In addition to the organization of numerous training courses for teachers, and projects to improve school materials, libraries and buildings for education.

"...from my disciples I have learned... more than from my teachers."

— Bartholomew Cossio

== Portraits ==
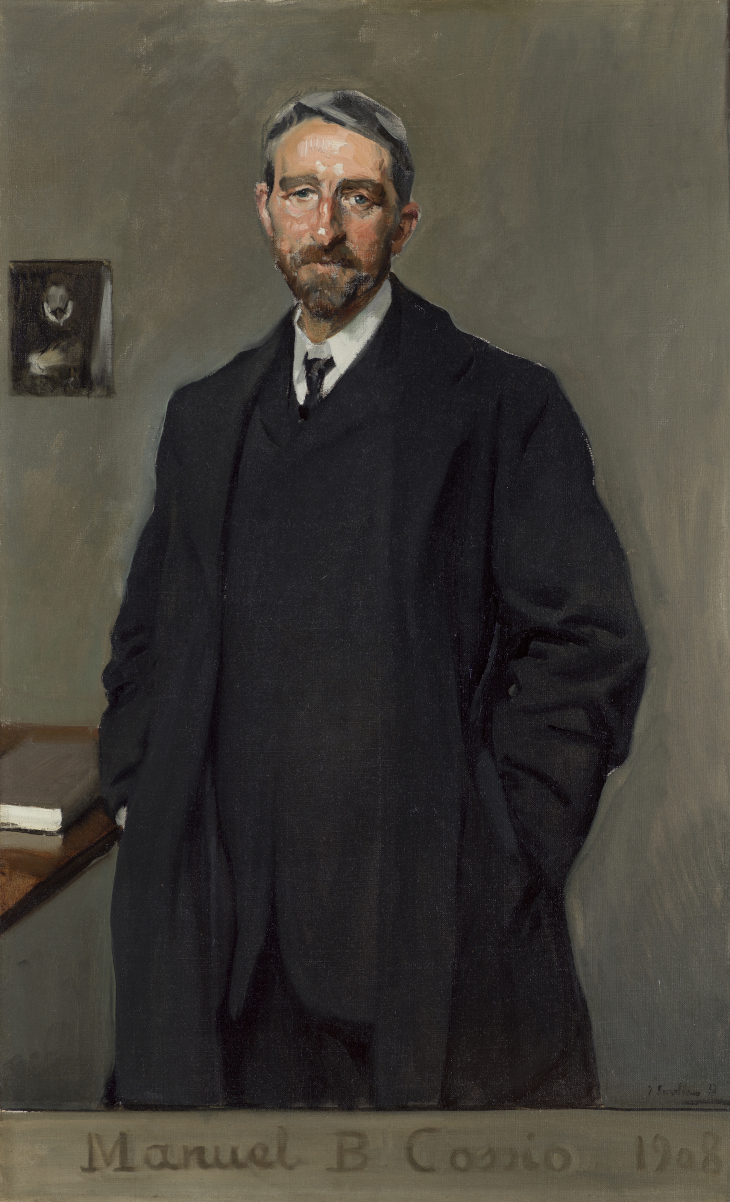
Joaquín Sorolla, Portrait of Manuel Bartolomé Cossío (signed and dated by the painter in 1908). Sorolla included in the sober three-quarter portrait a small reproduction of El Greco's painting The Nobleman with his Hand on his Chest.

The psychological and human profile that Cossío drew with his own intellectual and vital work, is completed with innumerable portraits of his personality made by many of those who knew and treated him. As samples can be collected two of those portraits of very different literary style, the poetic one of Juan Ramón Jiménez, and the emotional memory of one of his students, the politician Julián Besteiro .

"Yes, here he is already with his eyes, the windmill hands in the sky, his gaze fresh -I remember a twilight seascape from the North like Cossío; a cloudy seascape, nobly colorful, with a ship stranded on the coast, exchanged water and sky, in whose revolution he calmly watched over a star-.It stands, like a bent lily, with a new water -Cossío has a lot of tender vegetable and rich mineral; few men have seemed to me so landscape-. Here it is already, owner of the radiant idea, the announcing angel with the great wing, caught by one foot!

— Juan Ramon Jimenez

"He cared for everyone, especially the children and the teacher of all; and we all trusted him equally; the smallest details of organization weighed on him; collective trust rested on his care; his were the greatest cares, the greatest jobs, the greatest fatigue, and his effort seemed to spring from an inexhaustible and joyous source.When fatigue gave in and a respite of rest was imposed, it was enough for that young master to get up so that the weakest of us suddenly stood up, ready to follow him unconditionally. That young teacher was more than a teacher for us, he was our friend, he was the human example that we would have wanted to make in our lives. He was our hero."

— Julian Besteiro

=== Of pedagogy ===
(For a more complete bibliography consult: Otero Urtaza, Eugenio M. (1994). Ministry of Education and Science, ed. Bartolomé Cossío. Pedagogical thought and educational action . Madrid. pp. 312–318 . ISBN 84-369-2534-3.)

- "Character, meaning and limits that primary education must have in all its grades" in Minutes of the sessions held National Pedagogical Congress, 1882, Madrid: Sociedad El Fomento de Las Artes-Librería de D. Gregorio Hernando, 1882.
- "Manual work in primary school", in the Bulletin of the Institución Libre de Enseñanza year VII, n. 151 (May 30, 1883) p. 156-158
- "Judgment about the general examination system". Presentation at the Hispanic-Portuguese-American Pedagogical Congress meeting in Madrid in October 1892: preparatory work for the congress, minutes, general summaries . Madrid: Library of the Widow of Hernando, 1894
- "On the teaching of drawing at school", in the Bulletin of the Free Institution of Education Year XXV, n. 490 (January 31, 1901); p. 7-9
- "On the teaching of history in the Institution" in: Bulletin of the Institución Libre de Enseñanza Year XXVIII, n. 532 (July 31, 1904); p. 203-205
- The Teacher, the school and the teaching material . Madrid: Ediciones de La Lectura, [1910], published for the first time in 1906 by the National Pedagogical Museum .
- "Espagne" voice in: Nouveau dictionnaire de pédagogie et d'instructionprimaire published under the direction of F. Buisson . Paris: Librairie Hachette, 1911, P. 566-573
- "The Teaching of art: Normal conferences on the teaching of infants" in: Bulletin of the Free Institution of Education Year IX, n. 211 (November 30, 1885); p. 348-352
- "On aesthetic education" in: Bulletin of the Institución Libre de Enseñanza year XI, n. 241 (February 28, 1887); p. 321-322.
- Comments on El Greco; The education of the sonorous rabation. Madrid: Center for Historical Studies. Word Archive, 1931.
- "Comment doivent être pratiquées les excursions scolaires" in: Rapports preliminary Congrès International de l'Enseignement, Bruxxelles, 1880. Bruxelles: F. Hayez, 1882.
- "The students of the schools of Madrid in the Museum of painting: practical advice to make an excursion" in: Bulletin of the Free Institution of education year XIII, n. 286 (January 15, 1889); p. 5-6.
- Program. Free Institution of Education . Madrid: Free Institution of Education, 1910.
- On the fiftieth anniversary of the Madrid Free Institution of Education : Archivos Typography, 1926.
- "The Pedagogical Museum of Madrid: Report at the International Conference on Education held in London in August 1884", in Anuario de Primera Enseñanza . Madrid: General Directorate of Public Instruction, 1887-1886.
- Situation of Public Instruction in Belgium, 1886.
- Primary Education in Spain, second edition renewed by Lorenzo Luzuriaga; Madrid: National Pedagogical Museum, 1915.
- "Payment to teachers". Bulletin of the Free Institution of Education, year XXV, n. 493 (April 30, 1901); p. 96-102.
- "On the reform of national education". National magazine: organ of the National League of Producers year 1, n. 3 (May 1, 1899).
- "Teaching practices in normal schools". Bulletin of the Free Institution of Education, year XIV, n. 330 (November 15, 1890); p. 321-325.
- "Number of normal schools that there should be in Spain". Bulletin of the Free Institution of Education year XIV, n. 326 (September 15, 1890); p. 257-260.
- "Examinations in Europe". Bulletin of the Free Institution of Education year XVIII, n. 406 (January 31, 1894); p. 4-6.
- "Teaching in the United States and its organization". Bulletin of the Free Institution of Education year XIII, n. 307 (November 30, 1889); p. 337-339.
- State of public instruction in Belgium . Madrid: Pedagogical Museum of Primary Instruction, 1886 (M. Burgase).
- Pedagogical program of the Institución Libre de Enseñanza, on the fiftieth anniversary of the Institution. 1926.
- Of his day: (fragments) . Madrid: Imp. Blass, 1929. (Cossío's works published by his disciples as a tribute on the day of his retirement)
- "The art of knowing how to see". Bulletin of the Free Institution of Education, 1987.

=== On art history ===
- El Greco . Madrid: Victoriano Suarez, 1908.
- El Greco . Forty-eight illustrations with text by Manuel B. Cossío. Barcelona: J. Thomas, 1913.
- "Praise of popular art" reproduction of the prologue of: Popular embroidery and lace, Madrid Exhibition, May 1913 . In: The Jiménez-Cossío Collection of the Museo das Mariñas . Betanzos: Mariñas Museum, 1996.
- What is known about the life of El Greco Madrid: Jiménez-Fraud, 1914 (V. Suárez).
- The Burial of the Count of Orgaz Madrid: V. de Suárez, 1914.
- Excursion to Toledo Madrid: Regia Tourism Commissariat, 1925.
- "Spanish painting" In: Guillman, Federico. Illustrated popular encyclopedia of sciences and arts formed according to the Iconographic Encyclopedia and the German Conversation lexicon . Madrid: Gras y Compañía, 1882-1886 (Enrique Rubiños) 9 vols.

=== On other matters ===
- Unpublished letters, obituaries and other writings; selection and notes by Rubén Landa, Mexico: Instituto Luis Vives, 1973.

==== Studies on Bartolomé Cossío ====
(in addition to those included in the references)

- Joaquín Xirau Palau : Manuel B. Cossío and education in Spain Colegio de México, 1945. [1]
- Luis Álvarez Santullano : The living thought of Cossío, Buenos Aires, Editorial Losada, 1946.
- Julio Caro Baroja : The man and the educator who was Cossío, within the work of several authors An educator for a people, Madrid, UNED, 1987.
- Antonio Jiménez-Landi : Human Semblance of Manuel B. Cossío, Santander, Gonzalo Bedía Graphic Arts Workshop, 1984. And Manuel B. Cossío. An exemplary life (1857-1935), Alicante, Juan Gil-Albert Institute of Culture, 1989.

== Notes ==
- The liberal heritage in Cossío's blood could well have come from his great-grandfather Manuel Flores Calderón, former president of the Cortes del Trienio Liberal, shot in 1831 along with the liberal general and politician José María Torrijos . In the well-known painting by Gisbert, Cossío's grandfather holds the hand of the leader of the rebellion shortly before they are shot, after the betrayal and deception of Vicente González Moreno, for such an action known as "the executioner of Malaga". (Luis Reyes, The Execution of Torrijos . Stories of History, 2007)
- From that time also dates his friendship with another fighter for the renewal of pedagogy, the Majorcan Guillem Cifre de Colonya. Biography of Guillem Cifre de Colonya Archived 2008-08-29 at the Wayback Machine.
- Cossío obtained from the Vatican, with time and effort, a dispensation to celebrate a mixed wedding, the bride being a Catholic and he a dissident, on the condition that the wedding not take place on Spanish soil.
- Family farm located in the village of San Fiz de Vijoy, municipality of Bergondo, in the Betanzos estuary . Natalia II, as she was signed, was -according to Aquilino Duque- a spectacular beauty, to the point that the painter Gregorio Prieto called her "The Flower of Oxford".
- Carmen López, his widow, died on March 19, 1938. Alberto Jiménez Fraud, husband of his daughter Natalia, died in Geneva on April 23, 1964 (his remains were also moved to Giner and Cossío's grave). His youngest daughter, Julia, died on November 29, 1974, and his eldest, Natalia, on October 1, 1979.
- During the Franco regime Avenida de Jose Antonio, and after the Spanish democratic recovery Avinguda del Antic Regne.
