= Rafael Torres =

Rafael Torres may refer to:

- Rafael Torres (boxer), Dominican boxer
- Rafael Torres (footballer), Brazilian footballer
- Rafael Torres Campos, Spanish geographer
- Rafael Torres Escartín, Spanish anarchist militant

== See also ==
- Raffi Torres (Raphael Torres), Canadian ice hockey player
