= Victoriano Balasanz =

Spanish painter (1854–1929)

Victoriano Balasanz Sánchez (23 March 1854 — 27 October 1929) was a Spanish painter.

== Biography ==
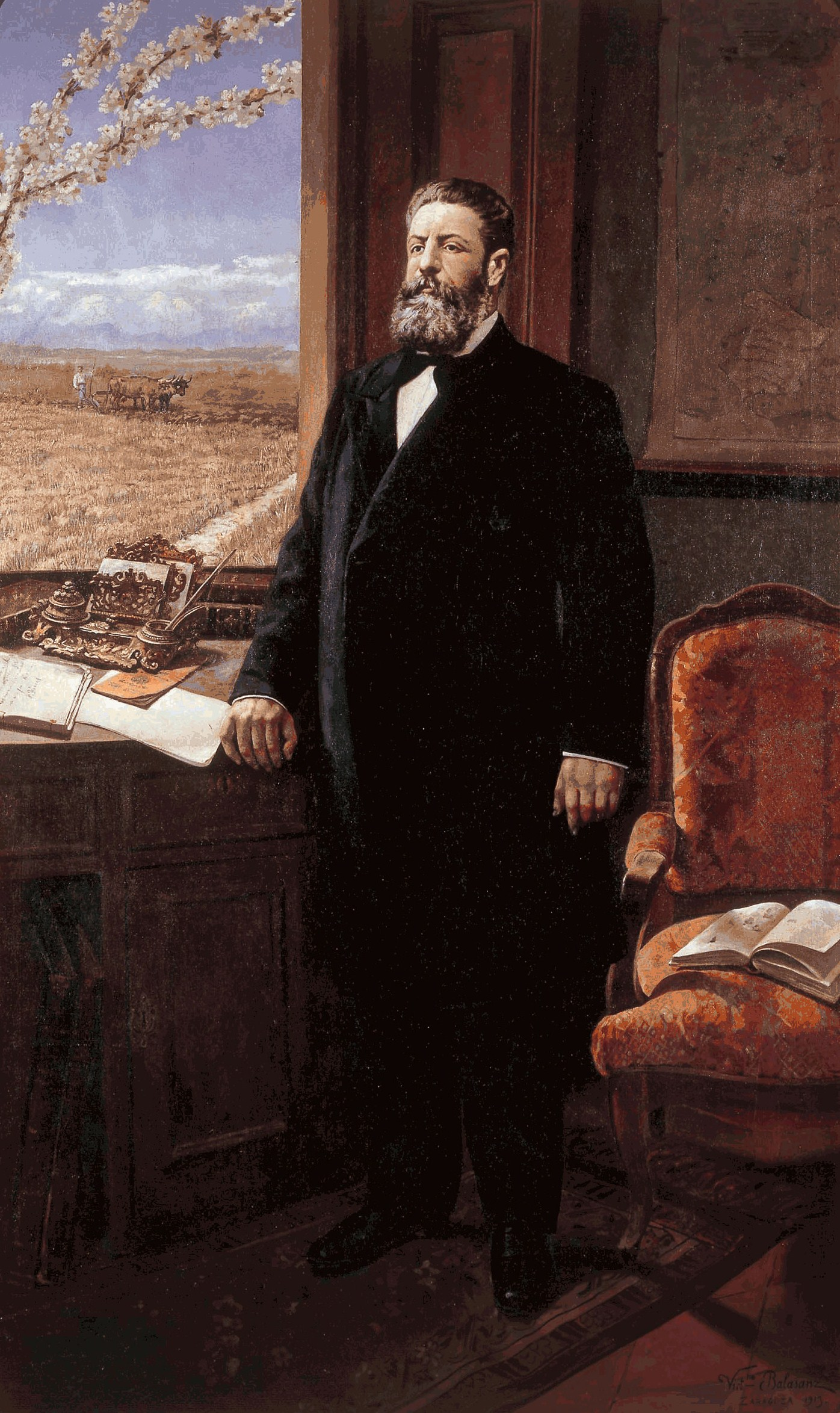
Posthumous portrait of Joaquín Costa, 1913

Balasanz was born on 23 March 1854 in Castiliscar, although he was primarily circumscribed to Zaragoza. One of his teachers at the Escuela de Bellas Artes de Zaragoza was Eduardo López del Plano, also studying at the Escuela Especial de Madrid. He cultivated history painting in a "rather cold and awkward" manner, as described by Federico Torralba Soriano, and gained some reputation. Like Plano, he became a pensioner and was in correspondence with Zenón Trigo when there were difficulties with the Ayuntamiento de Zaragoza. Related to spiritism, he died on 27 October 1929 in Montevideo, having emigrated to South America in old age.
