= Institución Libre de Enseñanza =

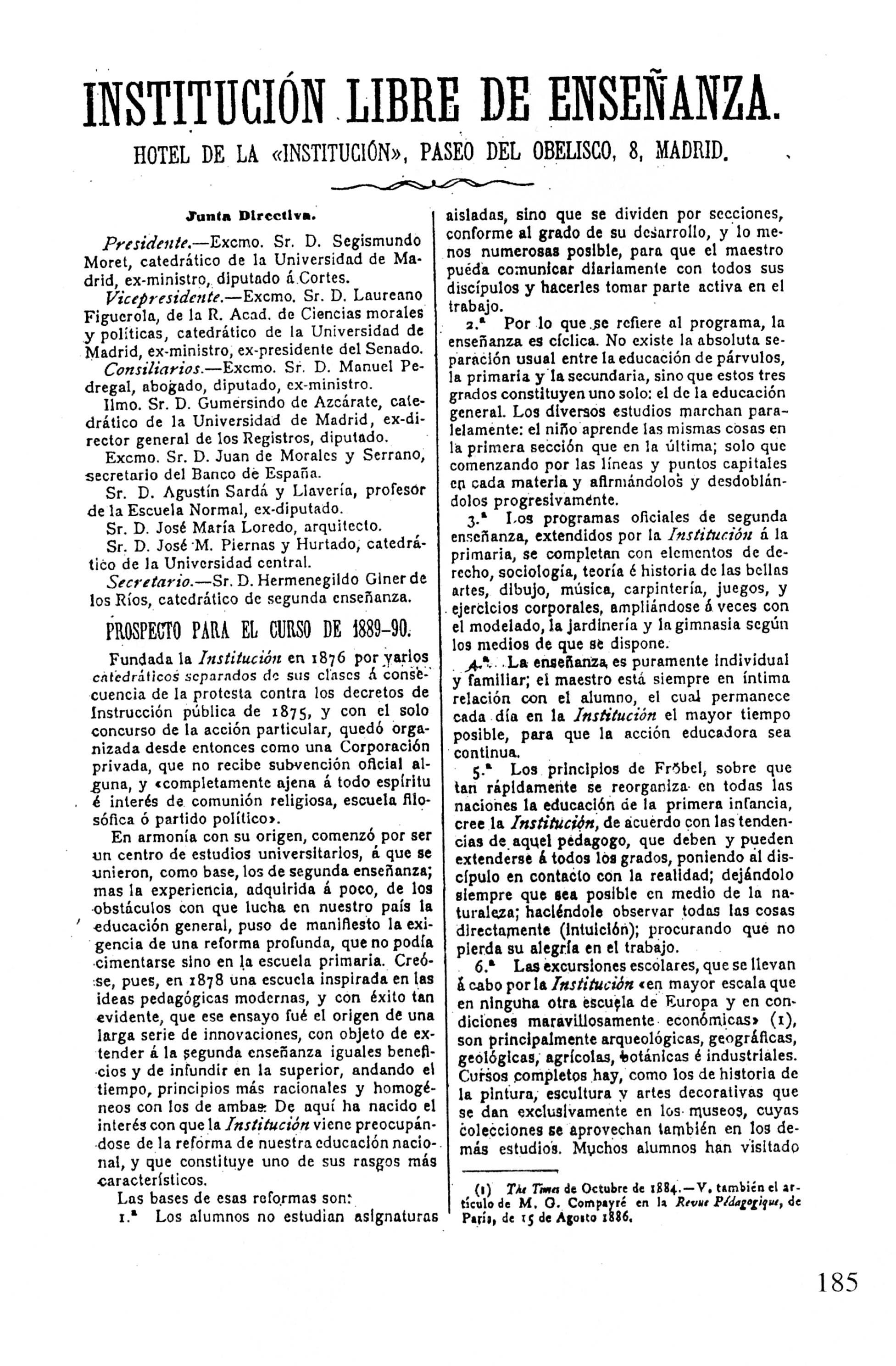
The board of directors for the 1889–1890 ILE course

The Institución Libre de Enseñanza (ILE, English: Free Teaching Institution) was a pedagogical experience developed in Spain for more than half a century (1876–1939). It was inspired by the Krausist philosophy introduced at the Complutense University of Madrid by Julián Sanz del Río, and had an important impact on Spanish intellectual life, as it carried out a fundamental work of renewal in Restoration Spain.

The Institución Libre de Enseñanza was founded in 1876 as a reaction to Cánovas del Castillo's policy of restricting academic freedom. The group of professors who had been removed from the Central University (the University of Madrid) for defending academic freedom and refusing to conform their teachings to any official dogma in religious, political, or moral matters, came together to offer an educational alternative to the one imposed by the government. Among them were Augusto González de Linares and Laureano Calderón (the first two professors to resign), Gumersindo de Azcárate, Teodoro Sainz Rueda, Nicolás Salmerón, Francisco Giner de los Ríos, and Laureano Figuerola, who would become the Institution's first dean, Consequently, they had to continue their educational work outside the public sector by establishing a secular private educational institution, starting with university-level instruction and later extending their activities to primary and secondary education.

Intellectuals such as Joaquín Costa, Leopoldo Alas (Clarín), Ramon Perez de Ayala, José Ortega y Gasset, Gregorio Marañón, Ramón Menéndez Pidal, Antonio Machado, Joaquín Sorolla, Augusto González Linares, Santiago Ramón y Cajal, and Federico Rubio supported and backed the pedagogical project. All of them were committed to the educational, cultural and social renewal of the time.

== History ==
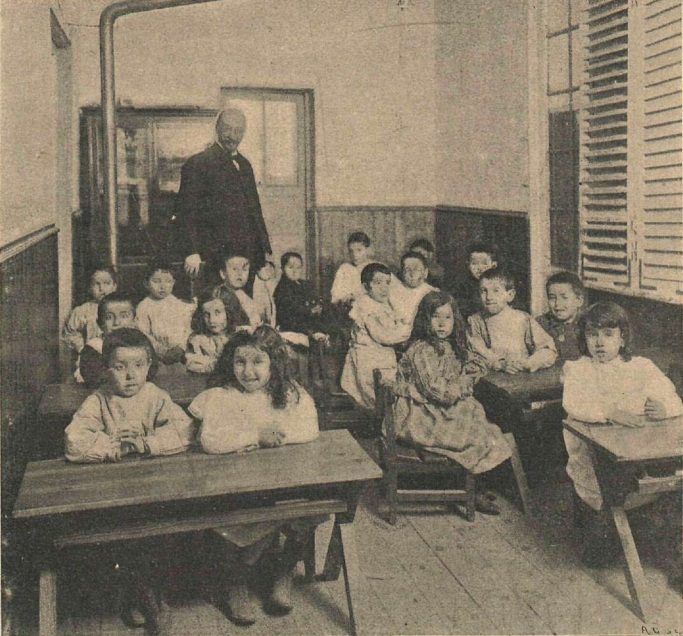
Primary education students of the Free Institution of Education, c. 1903

The political model of Antonio Cánovas del Castillo wanted to ensure a fundamentalist Catholic nation. The Royal Decree of 1875 issued by the Minister of Education Manuel Orovio Echagüe, severely limited academic freedom in Spain "if it went against the postulates of the faith", that is, if it went against the dogmas and postulates of the conservative Roman Catholicism in Spain.

From 1881 onwards, the faculty recently trained in its bosom began to teach at the Institución Libre de Enseñanza: Manuel Bartolomé Cossío, who succeeded Giner at the head of the Institución, Ricardo Rubio, Pedro Blanco Suárez, Ángel do Rego, José Ontañón Arias, and Pedro Jiménez-Landi, strengthened the project and ensured its future (disrupted by the Civil War in 1936 and later wiped out). The Institution became the center of Spanish culture until the Civil War and managed to introduce the most advanced foreign pedagogical and scientific theories into Spain.

The list of contributors to The Bulletin of the Institución Libre de Enseñanza included Bertrand Russell, Henri Bergson, Charles Darwin, John Dewey, Santiago Ramón y Cajal, Miguel de Unamuno, Montessori, Leo Tolstoy, H. G. Wells, Rabindranath Tagore, Juan Ramón Jiménez, Gabriela Mistral, Benito Perez Galdos, Emilia Pardo Bazán, Azorin, Eugenio d'Ors and Ramón Pérez de Ayala. Contributors closely linked to the institution included Julián Sanz del Río, Demófilo and the "children" Antonio Machado and Manuel Machado, Julio Rey Pastor, Constancio Bernaldo de Quirós, Luis Simarro, Nicholas Achúcarro, Francisco Barnes Salinas and Alice Pestana.

The ILE began to critically investigate the Spanish past, and from it emerged the Center for Historical Studies, led by the founder of the Spanish philological school, Ramón Menéndez Pidal. The ILE also created contact centers for artistic and scientific elites with the European avant-garde movement, notably the Residencia de Estudiantes, led by Alberto Jiménez Fraud, and the Junta para la Ampliación de Estudios (Board for Advanced Studies and Scientific Research), organized by José Castillejo.

The poetic movement of the Generation of '27 was largely a consequence of the Institución Libre de Enseñanza, shortly before modernisation was halted by the Spanish Civil War and the subsequent Franco dictatorship. Under Franco all progressive educational assets were confiscated and their advocates forced into exile. Those who remained faced censorship, prosecution, and ridicule, as their detractors considered them unpatriotic. Abroad, the exiles were dispersed throughout Europe and Latin America, moving to different countries and thus crossing cultural and progressive ideas throughout the Western world.

In Franco's Spain, the ILE was blamed for all the country's ills, accusing them of unleashing the war. An example of this revisionist and totally anti-ILE attitude can be found in a 1940 collective work sponsored by the Confederación Católica Nacional de Padres de Familia, in which the most visceral and atrocious attacks are launched against the work of the ILE. In the last chapter of the book, it is proposed to raze the children's school that the ILE had in Calle Martínez Campos in Madrid, sowing the site with salt in order to remind future generations of "the betrayal of the owners of that house towards the immortal Homeland".

Following the Spanish transition to democracy in 1978, when the legal process of recovering the legacy of the institution began, ILE funds have been managed by the Fundación Francisco Giner de los Ríos created for that purpose.

== Headquarters ==
The 200 founding shareholders abandoned the first proposed ILE headquarters in the Paseo de la Castellana, since occupied by the Military School, and instead rented an apartment in Calle Esparteros No. 9 (currently renumbered as No. 11), and subsequently relocated to Infantas No. 42 before moving again to Paseo del Oblisco No. 8 (since 1914 known as Paseo del General Martínez Campos No. 14 and No. 16).

The building block included a garden, on what was then the outskirts of Madrid, and was better suited to the educational concept of the institution. In 1908 the site was further developed with the construction of the Giner Pavilion and Soler Hall.

During the Spanish Civil War the building was heavily damaged and looted, and even underwent a symbolic destruction of trees by a group of Falangists (only a century-old acacia and privet were saved). In 1940 the site was seized and attached to the Ministry of Education, refitted (1942) and reopened (1945) as School Group Joaquin Sorolla (close to the present Sorolla Museum). After 1955 its premises were used as headquarters of the School Food Service.

After the Transition, the facility was briefly opened as the Eduardo Marquina National College (1980–1985); but was finally allocated to the Free Institution of Education in 1982. Recent renovations have provided the ILE with state-of-the-art buildings.

== Influences ==
The influence of the Institución Libre de Enseñanza was decisive for the public authorities to undertake a series of reforms that Spain needed in the legal, educational, and social spheres. Under its influence, the Museo Pedagógico Nacional and the Junta de Ampliación de Estudios were created. The Junta de Ampliación de Estudios, organised by its secretary José Castillejo, was originally set up to send Spanish students—regardless of their ideology—to study abroad. Later new centers sprang up under the auspices of the Junta, such as the Centro de Estudios Históricos, the Instituto Nacional de Ciencias Físico-Naturales and the Residencia de Estudiantes which, directed by Alberto Jiménez Fraud, was in Calle Pinar. The Residencia de Estudiantes was considered a breeding ground for writers, artists, and ideas. It was home to prominent poets, filmmakers, and scientists such as Federico García Lorca, Luis Buñuel, Salvador Dalí, Jorge Guillén, Severo Ochoa. Albert Einstein gave a lecture during his trip to Spain in 1923.

Attempts at pedagogical renewal led to the founding of pioneering initiatives between 1907 and 1936, such as the Instituto Escuela, the school vacation camps, the International Summer University of Santander, and the so-called Misiones Pedagógicas, which operated under the protection of the Second Republic with the aim of spreading education and culture among the peoples of deep Spain.

About a year after his death in 1915, followers of Francisco Giner de los Ríos established a foundation bearing his name to ensure the continuity of the ILE and pursue its educational objectives. The Foundation published the Complete Works of Francisco Giner between 1916 and 1936.

There are still schools that are linked to the current Foundation Giner de los Ríos, and continue to provide, with certain variations, the educational model of the ILE like the Colegio Estudio, founded in 1940 by Jimena Menéndez Pidal, Angels Gasset, and Carmen Garcia del Diestro, which educated Spanish intellectuals and politicians. Later similar private institutions emerged, like Colegio Base and Colegio Estilo, founded in 1959 by Spanish writer Josefina Aldecoa.

One of the most peculiar effects of the ILE is the Colegio Fingoi in the city of Lugo, founded in the midst of the Falangist opposition (1950) by Antonio Fernández López, a Galician businessman and philanthropist, who wanted to develop the ideas of the ILE in Franco's Spain.

== Associated people ==
=== First promotion ===
The early members of the ILE were mainly men who gathered around Giner after his return to the university in 1881 following his 1875 expulsion. They included Manuel Bartolomé Cossío, Joaquín Costa, Leopoldo Alas (Clarín), Alfredo Calderón, Eduardo Soler, Messia Jacinto Adolfo Posada, Pedro Dorado Montero, Aniceto Sela, and Rafael Altamira.

=== Second promotion ===
Giner called the acolytes of the ILE his "children". These included Julián Besteiro, Pedro Corominas, José Manuel Pedregal, Martin Navarro Flores, Constancio Bernaldo Quiros, Manuel and Antonio Machado, Domingo Barnés, José Castillejo, Gonzalo Jimenez de la Espada, Luis de Zulueta and Fernando de los Rios.

=== Third promotion ===
Those born between 1880 and 1890, are recognized as the "grandchildren" of Giner; noted pupils included José Pijoán, Juan Ramón Jiménez, Francisco Ribera Pastor, José Ortega y Gasset, Américo Castro, Gregorio Marañón, Manuel García Morente, Lorenzo Luzuriaga, Paul Azcarate and Alberto Jiménez Fraud.

== The women of the Institución Libre de Enseñanza ==
Women make up a group with less prominence but with a willingness and appreciation of their work. Over the years, the names of women involved in ILE projects such as Amparo Cebrián, Carmen García del Diestro, Laura García Hoppe, Gloria Giner de los Ríos García, María Goyri, Matilde Huici, María de Maeztu, Jimena Menéndez-Pidal, María Moliner, María Luisa Navarro Margati, Alice Pestana, Laura de los Ríos Giner, Concepción Saiz Otero, María Sánchez Arbós, María Zambrano, and Carmen de Zulueta, among many others, have been highlighted.

One of the most important social innovations of the ILE was its proposal in favor of the integration of women into the general body of society, with equal access to cultural training and professional fulfillment.

The Asociación para la Enseñanza de la Mujer (Association for the Education of Women) was also created, with Manuel Ruíz de Quevedo (from 1874 until his death in April 1898), Gumersindo de Azcárate (until his death in December 1917), and José Manuel Pedregal presiding over its Board of Directors. Another man of the Institution, Aniceto Sela, promoted Institución para la Enseñanza de la Mujer de Valencia, and several founders were involved in projects related to the social promotion of women, among them Juan Facundo Ríaño, Rafael Torres Campos and Francisco Giner de los Ríos himself, who taught psychology at the Escuela de Institutrices.

== See also ==
- Escuela Moderna
- Generation of '98
- Noucentisme
- Regenerationism
