= Gumersindo de Azcárate =

Spanish philosopher, jurist and politician

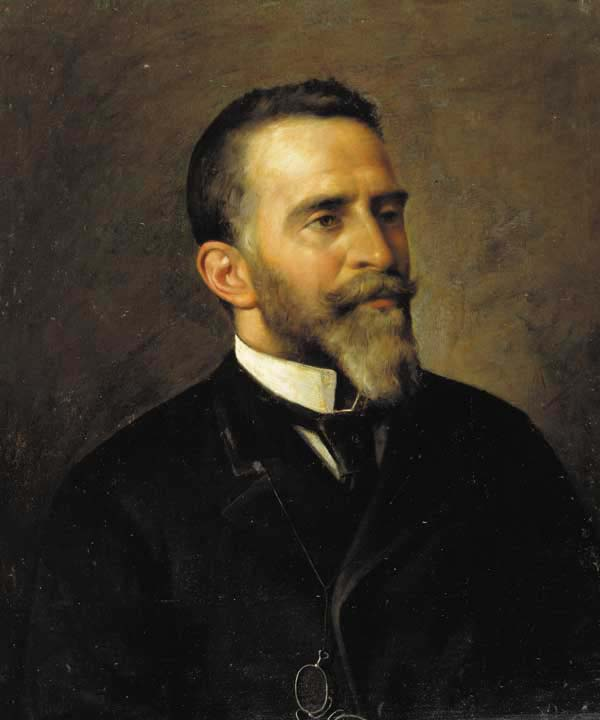
Gumersindo de Azcárate

Gumersindo de Azcárate (1840, León - 1917, Madrid) was a Spanish philosopher, jurist and politician.

== Biography ==
After law studies in Oviedo, he taught comparative law in Madrid since 1864 and represented León in the Cortes. In the 1870s, he joined Francisco Giner de los Ríos and Julián Sanz del Río to teach at the Institución Libre de Enseñanza (Institute of Free Teaching).

De Azcárate was a leading representative of Krausismo, a philosophy based on the teachings of Karl Christian Friedrich Krause, in law. In his works, which include Estudios económicos y sociales (1876), El self-government y la Monarquía doctrinaria (1877), Estudios filosóficos y políticos (1877) and Concepto de la Sociología (1876), he opposed excessive political centralism, proposed privatisation of nonessential governmental functions and studied models of parliamentary and decentralised government.

In 1912, he was the co-founder of the Reformist Republican Party.
