= Joaquín Costa =

Spanish lawyer, economist and historian

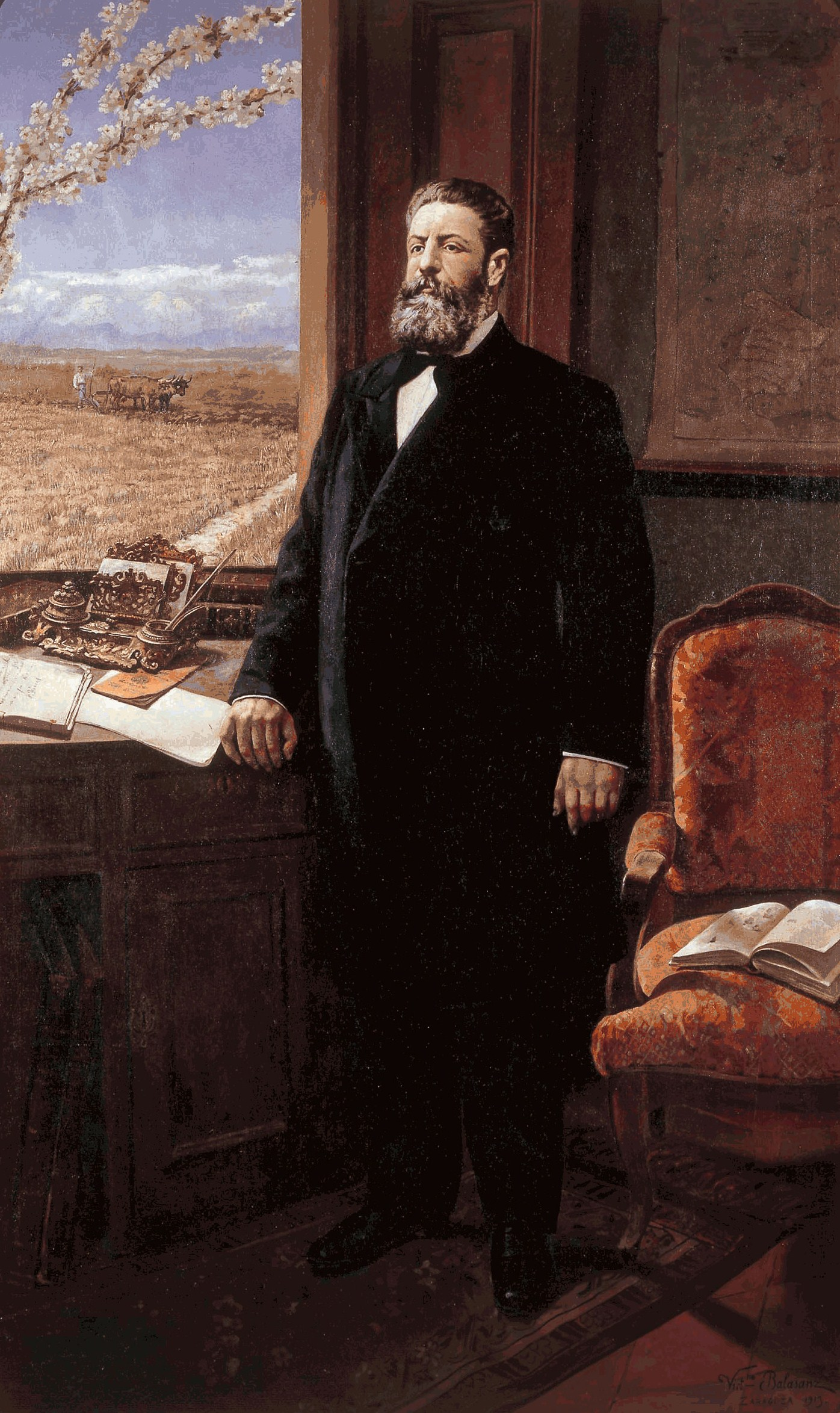
Portrait of Joaquín Costa by Victoriano Balasanz

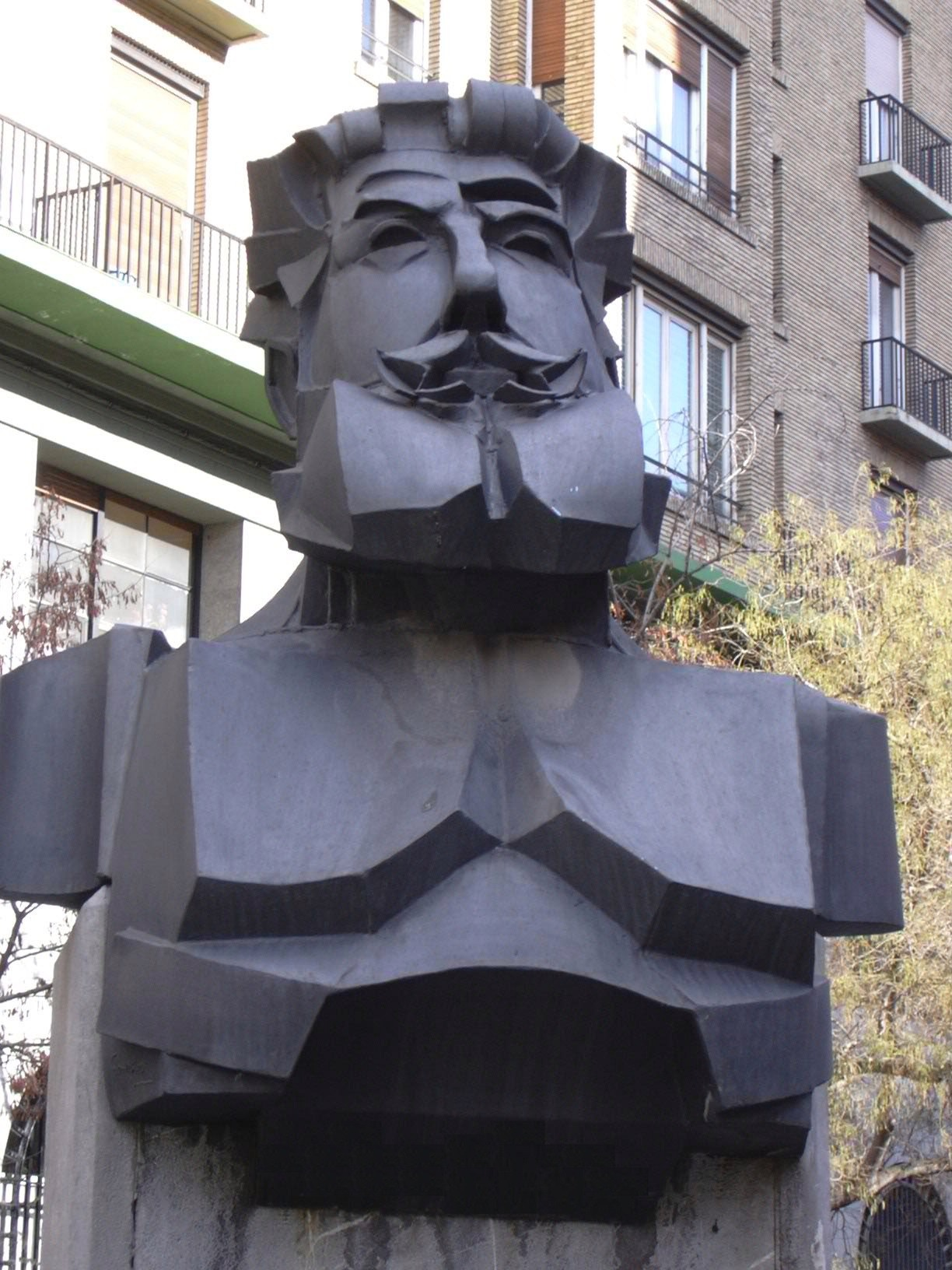
Statue of Joaquín Costa in Zaragoza.

Joaquín Costa (September 14, 1846, Monzón, Huesca Province – February 8, 1911, Graus, Huesca Province) was a Spanish politician, lawyer, economist and historian.

The son of an Aragonese farmer and his first wife, Costa was self-educated and campaigned to end what he considered to be Spanish backwardness. He desired to start a movement that would force politicians to embark on a program of educational, social, and economic reform.

According to Raymond Carr his ideas, known as 'Regenerationism' (scientific study of Spain's decline as a nation), rose to greater prominence in the aftermath of Spain's defeat in the Spanish–American War.
