= Francisco Giner de los Ríos =

Spanish philosopher (1839–1915)

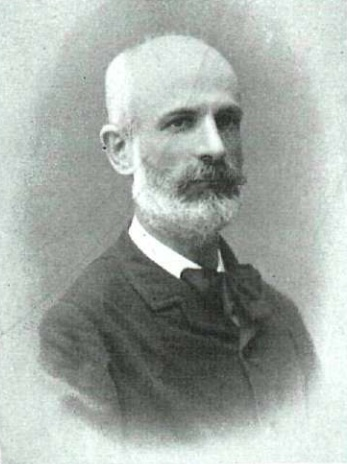
Francisco Giner de los Ríos (1881)

Francisco Giner de los Ríos (10 October 1839 in Ronda, Spain – 18 February 1915 in Madrid) was a philosopher, educator, and one of the most influential Spanish intellectuals at the end of the 19th and the beginning of the 20th century.

== Biography ==
He studied philosophy in Barcelona and Granada and eventually became professor of the philosophy of law and of international law at the University of Madrid. He was strongly influenced by the ideas of the Kantian German philosopher Karl Christian Friedrich Krause (as imported into Spain by Julián Sanz del Río) and became an important exponent of "Krausismo" in Spain.

He openly criticized the government for its attempts to stifle academic freedom. As a consequence, in 1875, he lost his chair at the university, which led to what can be seen as his major achievement: the 1876 foundation of the Institución Libre de Enseñanza (Institute of Free Teaching), a private school of higher learning. He dedicated his life to the formation of human beings along coeducation; rationalism; and freedom of teaching, research, and literary communication. The goal was a society in which free citizens would be governed by free citizens on the basis of an adequate education. Because of his "rational realist" approach to law, he can also be seen as one of the forerunners of the sociology of law.

Giner continued his work outside the university, even after he was reinstated in his university chair in 1881. Among the many important people who were at one time or another associated with the Institución Libre de Enseñanza and the related Residencia de Estudiantes were José Ortega y Gasset, Federico García Lorca, Salvador Dalí, Antonio Machado, Luis Buñuel and Miguel de Unamuno.
