= Anti-English sentiment =

Opposition to or fear of England and/or English people

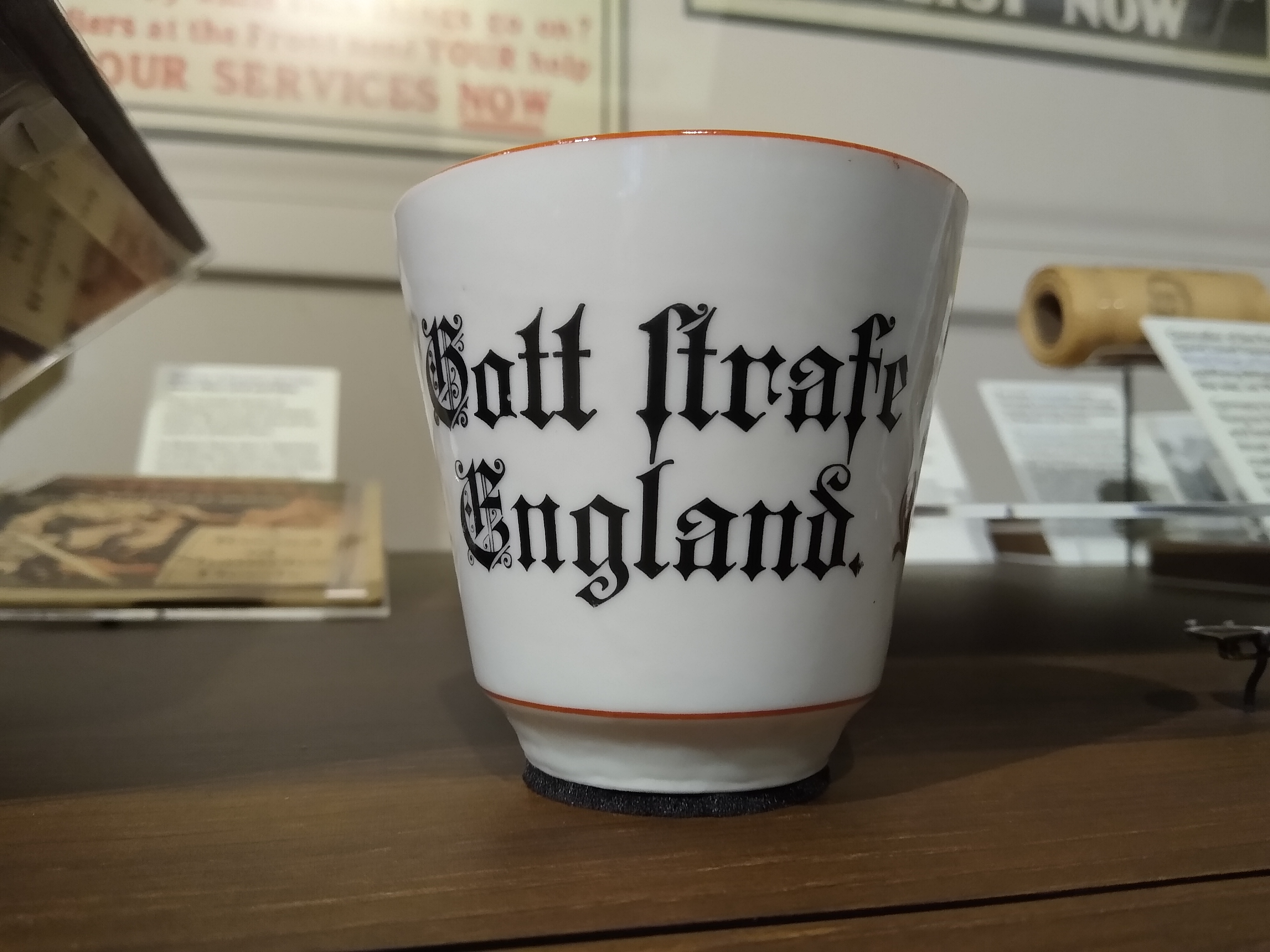
"Gott strafe England" ("May God punish England") on a World War I–era cup

Anti-English sentiment, also known as Anglophobia (from Latin Anglus "English" and Greek φόβος, phobos, "fear"), refers to opposition, dislike, fear, hatred, oppression, persecution, and discrimination of English people and/or England. It can be observed in various contexts within the United Kingdom and in countries outside of it. In the UK, Benjamin Disraeli and George Orwell highlighted anti-English sentiments among Welsh, Irish, and Scottish nationalisms. In Scotland, Anglophobia is influenced by Scottish identity. Football matches and tournaments often see manifestations of anti-English sentiment, including assaults and attacks on English individuals. In Wales, historical factors such as English language imposition and cultural suppression have contributed to anti-English sentiment. In Northern Ireland, anti-English sentiment, arising from complex historical and political dynamics, was exemplified in the IRA's targeting of England during the Troubles.

Outside the UK, anti-English sentiment exists in countries like Australia, New Zealand, France, Ireland, Russia, India, the United States, and Argentina. In Australia and New Zealand, stereotypes of English immigrants as complainers have fueled such sentiment. France has historical conflicts with England, like the Hundred Years' War, contributing to animosity. Russia has seen waves of Anglophobia due to historical events and suspicions of British meddling. Argentina's anti-British sentiment is linked to the Falklands War and perceptions of British imperialism.

Generally, the term is sometimes used more loosely as a synonym for anti-British sentiment. Its opposite is Anglophilia.

== Within the United Kingdom ==
British statesman and Prime Minister Benjamin Disraeli said that the proud English were sprung from "a horde of Baltic pirates who were never heard of in the greater annals of the world." In his essay "Notes on Nationalism", written in May 1945 and published in the first issue of the intellectual magazine Polemic (October 1945), George Orwell wrote that "Welsh, Irish and Scottish nationalism have points of difference but are alike in their anti-English orientation".

=== Scotland ===
In 1998, 19 year-old apprentice mechanic Mark Ayton was punched to the ground and kicked to death by three youths. Ayton's father explicitly cited his English accent as a factor contributing to the attack. Court proceedings recorded that immediately before the attack, the attackers were singing Flower of Scotland, which includes the lines "And sent them homeward, Tae think again": an allusion to the Scottish victory over the English army at the Battle of Bannockburn.

In 1999, an inspector and race relations officer with Lothian and Borders Police said that a correlation had been noticed between the establishment of the Scottish Parliament and anti-English incidents.

A 2005 study by Hussain and Millar of the Department of Politics at the University of Glasgow examined the prevalence of Anglophobia in relation to Islamophobia in Scotland. One finding of the report suggested that national "phobias" have common roots, independent of the nations towards whom they are directed. The study states that:

Scottish identity comes close to rivalling low levels of education as an influence towards Anglophobia. Beyond that, having an English friend reduces Anglophobia by about as much as having a Muslim friend reduces Islamophobia. And lack of knowledge about Islam probably indicates a broader rejection of the 'other', for it has as much impact on Anglophobia as on Islamophobia.

The study goes on to say (of the English living in Scotland): "Few of the English (only 16 per cent) see the conflict between Scots and English as even 'fairly serious'." The study found that Anglophobia was slightly less prevalent than Islamophobia but that, unlike Islamophobia, Anglophobia correlated with a strong sense of Scottish identity.

Hussain and Millar's research suggested that Anglophobia had fallen slightly since the introduction of devolution.

In 2009, a woman originally from England was assaulted in an allegedly anti-English racially motivated attack. Similar cases have been connected with football matches and tournaments, particularly international tournaments, in which the English and Scottish football teams often compete with each other. There was a spate of anti-English attacks in 2006 during the FIFA World Cup. In one incident a 7-year-old boy wearing an England shirt was punched in the head in an Edinburgh park.

In 2017 Kevin McKenna, former Scottish Journalist of the Year, penned an article in The National labelling English people living in Scotland as "colonising wankers".

In 2020, groups of Scottish nationalists picketed the English border, airports and railway stations sporting hazmat suits and dogs, intent on stopping English people from crossing the England-Scotland border. The Scottish Secretary Alister Jack accused Scotland's First Minister Nicola Sturgeon of having incited the incident by inaccurately using COVID statistics to stoke anti-English sentiment In the November of that year, SNP Westminster leader Ian Blackford was accused of making an Anglophobic attack against an English-born photographer living in Scotland: Blackford falsely accused Ollie Taylor of breaching pandemic travel restrictions after he posted a photograph of the Northern Lights at Caithness on his Twitter profile, claiming that he lived in the south of England. Taylor had in fact moved to Caithness earlier in 2020. Other Twitter users accused Blackford of trying to organise a "pile on". Scottish Liberal Democrats leader Willie Rennie accused Blackford of bullying a private citizen and stoking anti-English sentiment in Scotland. Blackford apologised for his claims but insisted that he would "continue to stand up for my constituents" who "feel very strongly about the breaking of travel restrictions that we see across the Highlands and islands" (Blackford's constituency did not include Caithness). When questioned on Blackford's actions in the Scottish Parliament, First Minister and SNP leader Nicola Sturgeon said Blackford had "acted with grace and dignity".

=== Wales ===
The Laws in Wales Acts 1535 and 1542, also known as the "Acts of Union", passed by the Parliament of England, annexed Wales to the Kingdom of England and replaced the Welsh language and Welsh law with the English language and English law. Section 20 of the 1535 Act made English the only language of the law courts and stated that those who used Welsh would not be appointed to any public office in Wales. The Welsh language was supplanted in many public spheres. Much later, the Welsh Not was used in some schools to suppress the use of the Welsh language. This was never government policy, and was later described as a symbol of English cultural oppression.

Since the Glyndŵr Rising of the early 15th century, Welsh nationalism has been primarily non-violent. The Welsh militant group Meibion Glyndŵr (English: Sons of [Owain] Glyndŵr) were responsible for arson attacks on English-owned second homes in Wales from 1979 to 1994, motivated by cultural anti-English sentiment. Meibion Glyndŵr also attempted arson against several estate agents in Wales and England and against the offices of the Conservative Party in London.

In 2000, the Chairman of Swansea Bay Race Equality Council said that "Devolution has brought a definite increase in anti-English behaviour", citing three women who believed that they were being discriminated against in their careers because they could not speak Welsh. In 2001 Dafydd Elis-Thomas, a former leader of Plaid Cymru, said that there was an anti-English strand to Welsh nationalism.

On 21 April 2023, it was reported that Plaid Cymru councillor, Terry Davies had been suspended for a rant of discriminatory xenophobia. Davies referred to two colleagues as "outsiders" after telling them that "Wales is for Welsh people."

On 11 January 2024, It was reported that a note had been sent to an address in Aberystwyth, in Ceredigion, with racial slurs about English people from Birmingham. The note called for Brummies to "go back home to Brummyland". It also called the West Midlands accent "vomit-inducing", and urged the occupant to "take a few thousand other people back with them". Dyfed-Powys Police treated the note as a hate crime. It read: "Iorwerth Ave was once a nice, quiet, pleasant residential area until a load of [people] from the Midlands hit", and "Low-life like you should be forced to live in fenced in sites, preferably back where you came from."

=== Northern Ireland ===
During the Troubles, the Irish Republican Army (IRA) mainly attacked targets in Northern Ireland and England, not Scotland or Wales, although the IRA planted a bomb at Sullom Voe Terminal in Shetland during a visit by the Queen in May 1981. The ancestry of most people in the Loyalist and Unionist communities is Scottish rather than English. In the Protestant community, the English are identified with British politicians and are sometimes resented for their perceived abandonment of loyalist communities.

== Outside the United Kingdom ==
In his 1859 essay A Few Words on Non-Intervention, John Stuart Mill notes that England "finds itself, in respect of its foreign policy, held up to obloquy as the type of egoism and selfishness; as a nation which thinks of nothing but of out-witting and out-generalling its neighbours" and urges his fellow countrymen against "the mania of professing to act from meaner motives than those by which we are really actuated".

=== Australia ===
"Pommy" or "Pom" (acronym for 'Prisoner of [his] Majesty) is a common Australian slang word for the English, often combined with "whing[e]ing" (complaining) to make the expression "whingeing Pom" – an English immigrant who stereotypically complains about everything. Although the term is sometimes applied to British immigrants generally, it is usually applied specifically to the English. From the 19th century, there were feelings among established Australians that many immigrants from England were poorly skilled, unwanted by their home country and unappreciative of the benefits of their new country.

In recent years, complaints about two newspaper articles blaming English tourists for littering a local beach and calling the English "Filthy Poms" in the headlines and "Poms fill the summer of our discontent", were accepted as complaints and settled through conciliation by the Australian Human Rights Commission when the newspapers published apologies. Letters and articles which referred to English people as "Poms" or "Pommies" did not meet the threshold for racial hatred. In 2007 a complaint to Australia's Advertising Standards Bureau about a television commercial using the term "Pom" was upheld and the commercial was withdrawn.

The Australian word is infrequently used in New Zealand to refer to a British immigrant.

=== France ===
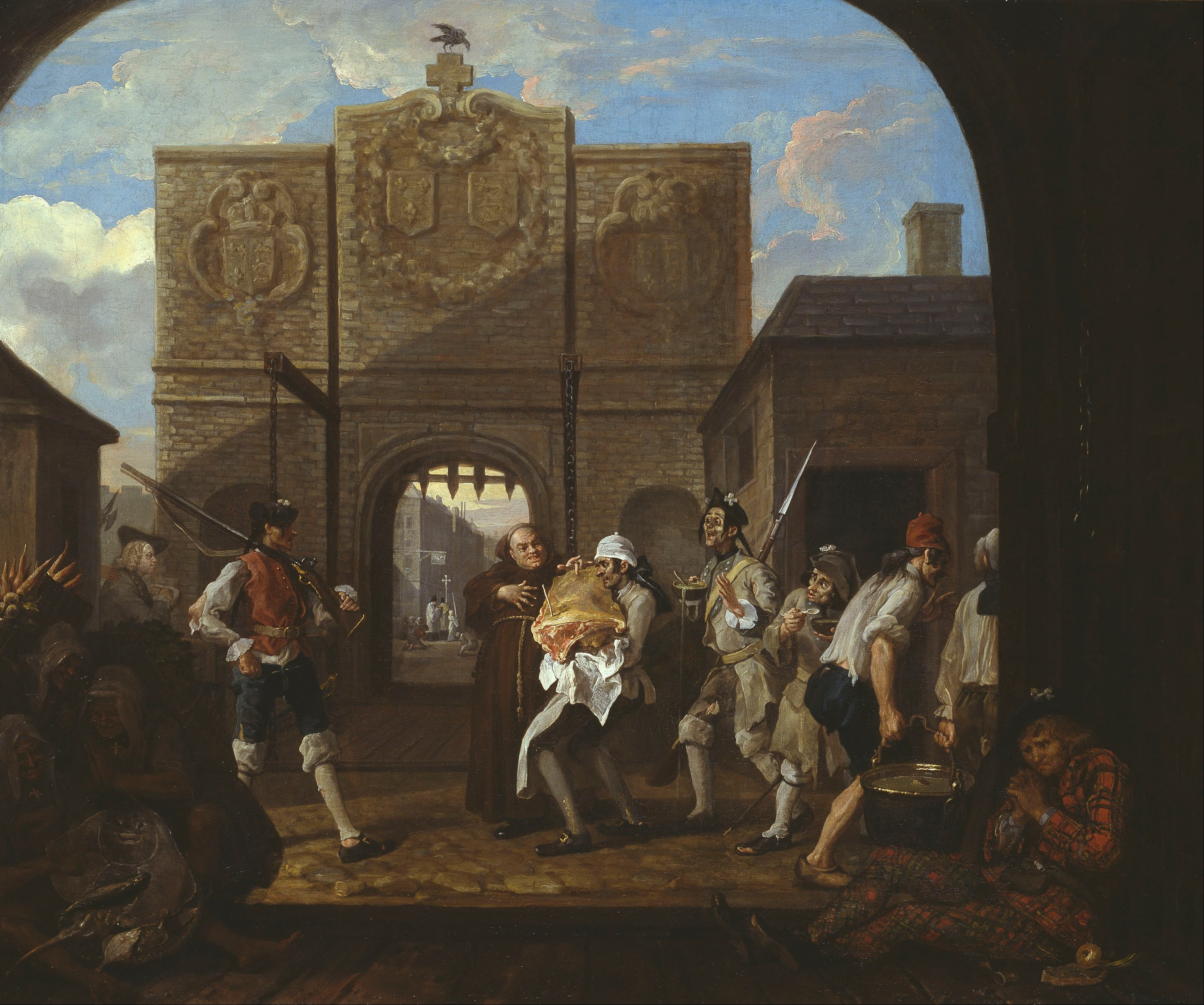
"Roastbeef" (or "rosbif") is a long-standing Anglophobe French slang term to designate the English or British people. Its origins lies in William Hogarth's francophobic painting The Gate of Calais or O! The Roast Beef of Old England, in which the "roastbeef" allegory is used as a mockery. Its popular use includes films, television shows and sketch comedies.

After the Norman Conquest of 1066, Anglo-Norman French replaced Old English as the official language of England. In the thirteenth and fourteenth centuries, the Plantagenet kings of England lost most of their possessions in France, began to consider England to be their primary domain and turned to the English language. King Edward I, when issuing writs for summoning parliament in 1295, claimed that the King of France planned to invade England and extinguish the English language, "a truly detestable plan which may God avert". In 1346, Edward III exhibited in Parliament a forged ordinance, in which Philip VI of France would have called for the destruction of the English nation and country. The Hundred Years' War (1337–1453) between England and France changed societies on both sides of the Channel.

The English and French were engaged in numerous wars in the following centuries. England's conflict with Scotland provided France with an opportunity to destabilise England and there was a firm friendship (known as the Auld Alliance) between France and Scotland from the late-thirteenth century to the mid-sixteenth century. The alliance eventually foundered because of growing Protestantism in Scotland. Opposition to Protestantism became a major feature of later French Anglophobia (and conversely, fear of Catholicism was a hallmark of Francophobia). Antipathy and intermittent hostilities between France and Britain, as distinct from England, continued during later centuries.

=== Ireland ===
There is a long tradition of Anglophobia within Irish nationalism. Much of this was grounded in the hostility felt by the largely Catholic Irish for the Anglo-Irish people, which was mainly Anglican. In Ireland before the Great Famine, anti-English hostility was deep-seated and was manifested in increased anti-English hostility organised by United Irishmen. In post-famine Ireland, anti-English hostility was adopted into the philosophy and foundation of the Irish nationalist movement. At the turn of the 20th century, the Celtic Revival movement associated the search for a cultural and national identity with an increasing anti-colonial and anti-English sentiment. Anti-English themes manifested in national organisations seen as promoting native Irish values, with the emergence of groups like Sinn Féin. One popular nationalist slogan was "England's difficulty is Ireland's opportunity" and the well-known anti-World-War-I song "Who is Ireland's Enemy?" used past events to conclude that it was England, and furthermore that Irish people ought to "pay those devils back".

The Gaelic Athletic Association (GAA) was founded in 1884 as a counter-measure against the Anglo-Irish Athletic Association, which promoted and supervised British sports such as English football in Ireland. The GAA was founded in the anti-English ideas of Thomas Croke, Archbishop of Cashel and Emly. From 1886 to 1971 the GAA focused national pride into distinctly non-English activities. Members were forbidden to belong to organisations that played "English" games and the organisation countered the Anglicisation in Irish society. With the development in Ireland of Irish games and the arts, the Celtic revivalists and nationalists identified characteristics of what they defined as the "Irish Race". A nationalistic identity developed, as the opposite of the Anglo-Saxons and untainted by the Anglo-Irish. A sense of national identity and Irish distinctiveness as well as an anti-English assertiveness was reinforced to Catholics by teachers in hedge schools.

A feeling of anti-English sentiment intensified within Irish nationalism during the Boer Wars, leading to xenophobia underlined by Anglophobia. Two units of Irish commandos fought with the Boer against British forces during the Second Boer War (1899–1902). J. Donnolly, a member of the brigade, wrote to the editor of the Irish News in 1901:

It was not for the love of the Boer we were fighting; it was for the hatred of the English. (J. Donnolly letter to the Irish News, 1901)

The pro-Boer movement gained widespread support in Ireland, and over 20,000 supporters demonstrated in Dublin in 1899 where Irish nationalism, anti-English and pro-Boer attitudes were one and the same. There was a pro-Boer movement in England as well but the English pro-Boer movement was not based on anti-English sentiments. These opposing views and animosity led the English and Irish pro-Boer groups to maintain a distance from one another. Despite this, far more Irishmen joined various Irish Regiments of the British Army during this time, more so than pro-Boer commandos.

The W. B. Yeats play The Countess Cathleen, written in 1892, has anti-English overtones comparing the English gentry to demons who come for Irish souls. Films set during the Irish War of Independence, such as The Informer (1935) and the Plough and the Stars (1936), were criticised by the BBFC for the director John Ford's anti-English content and in recent years, Michael Collins and The Wind That Shakes the Barley (despite being a joint British-Irish production) have led to accusations of Anglophobia in the British press. In 2006, Antony Booth, the father-in-law of Tony Blair, claimed he was the victim of anti-English vandalism and discrimination while living in County Cavan, Ireland, with his wife. In August 2008 an English pipe fitter based in Dublin was awarded €20,000 for the racial abuse and discrimination he received at his workplace.

In 2011, tensions and anti-English or anti-British feelings flared in relation to the proposed visit of Queen Elizabeth II, the first British monarch to visit Ireland in 100 years. The invitation by the President of Ireland, Mary McAleese, and the Irish government, was hailed by the Irish press as a historic visit but was criticised by Sinn Féin President Gerry Adams. An anti-Queen demonstration was held at the GPO Dublin by a small group of Irish Republicans on 26 February 2011, and a mock trial and decapitation of an effigy of Queen Elizabeth II were carried out by socialist republican group Éirígí. Other protests included one Dublin publican (the father of Celtic player Anthony Stokes) hanging a banner declaring "the Queen will never be welcome in this country".

In 2018, the Irish author and journalist Megan Nolan wrote an opinion piece for The New York Times that detailed how she had come to hate England and English people.

=== Russia ===
After the Anglo-Russian War, during which Britain plundered Russian shipping and raided the coast, the alliance against Napoleon was renewed. Despite this, the Great Game gave rise to a wave of widespread Anglophobia in Russia. During the Russo-Japanese War, there was a sentiment in Russia that England was behind Japan's militarism against Russia in the Far East, leading to a strained relationship between Britain and Russia. The UK and Russia were allies in World War I until the Bolshevik Revolution of 1918, after which the British again attacked Russian soil and the capitalist West became the target of the new Communist International ("Comintern"). In 1924, these tensions were briefly cooled when the Labour government of Prime Minister Ramsay MacDonald formally recognized the Soviet Union and established diplomatic relations between the two countries. The two were allies again starting in 1941. During the Cold War, Britain firmly sided with the West against the Soviet Union and the relationship between the two continues to remain dubious even today. Before 2018 FIFA World Cup, there had been controversies regarding Anglophobia in Russia.

=== Spain ===
Relations between England and Spain were not significantly hostile until the Age of Discovery and the rise of European colonialism in the 16th century, in which both countries' interests came into conflict following the European discovery of the Americas. Spain was the first European power to secure control over vast areas of the New World, and an outright rivalry soon developed with England as the latter pursued its own colonial enterprises in the Americas once the economic benefits became apparent. Additional factors such as the English Reformation and the Catholic Counter-Reformation heightened tensions substantially, and contributed in prompting both countries to seek leadership of opposing sides during major geopolitical conflicts in Europe and the Americas which led to multiple wars between England and Spain until the 19th century.

In the Americas, one of the main driving forces behind the Golden Age of Piracy was a deliberate attempt by England to undermine Spain's control over its possessions in the Caribbean, as well as to sabotage lucrative Spanish trade routes passing through the region. Spain intervened in favour of the United States during the American Revolutionary War, while Britain provided varying degrees of financial and logistical support to insurgents in the Spanish American wars of independence.

Historians have employed the term "Black legend" to describe an anti-Spanish, anti-Catholic historiographical tendency advanced by past enemies of Spain, such as England.

Despite a warming in relations from the 20th century onwards, issues such as disputes over the status of Gibraltar (which was annexed by Britain after the War of the Spanish Succession) still cause tensions between the two countries. A 2013 poll revealed that, regardless of the dispute over Gibraltar, 25% of Spanish respondents rated the relations between Spain and the UK as "bad", with 3.4% rating them as "very bad".

In recent times, anti-English and anti-tourist sentiments have overlapped to some degree in places within Spain's mediterranean coast.

=== United States ===
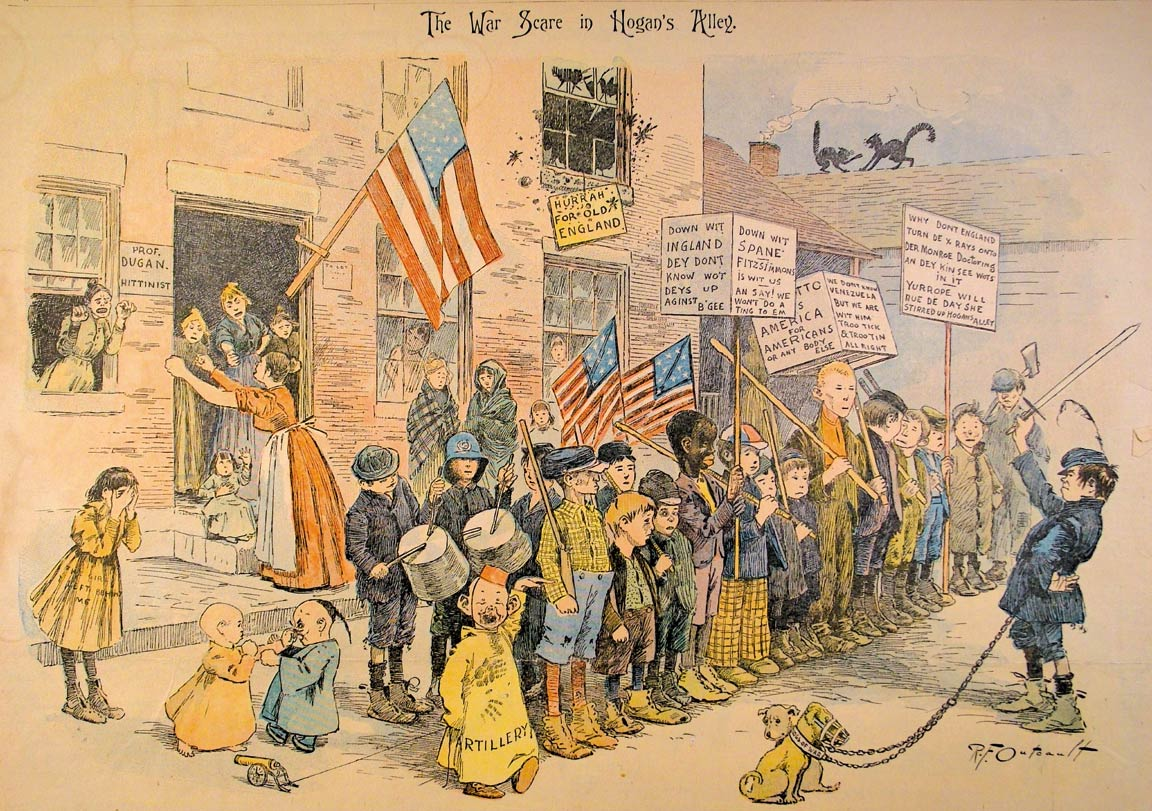
Slum children in New York City drilling under anti-English placards, "Yellow kid" cartoon by Richard F. Outcault from Joseph Pulitzer's Democratic newspaper New York World, 15 March 1896.

In the early years of the Republic, Anglophobia was particularly associated with the Jeffersonian Republicans in the 1790s, who warned that close ties with Great Britain were especially dangerous because that nation was an enemy of American Republicanism. By contrast, the opposing Federalist Party warned that the Jeffersonians were too sympathetic to the radicalism of the French Revolution. The Origins of the War of 1812 involved claimed violations against American neutrality by the United Kingdom during the Napoleonic Wars. The Treaty of Ghent, ratified in 1815 and ending the War of 1812, established peaceful relations for the two countries that has lasted more than two centuries, though this was stressed at times in the years following the treaty by events such as the Trent Affair of 1861 and the Fenian Raids in 1866–1871.

In the final days of the 1888 presidential campaign, a Republican operative claiming to be a British immigrant in America named Charles F. Murchison tricked the British ambassador Lord Sackville-West into indicating Britain's support for the Democratic candidate Grover Cleveland. The deliberately fabricated act forced Sackville-west to return to Britain.

The Great Rapprochement was the convergence of social and political objectives between the United Kingdom and the United States from 1895 until World War I began in 1914. The most notable sign of improving relations during the Great Rapprochement was Britain's actions during the Spanish–American War (started 1898). Initially Britain supported the Spanish Empire and its colonial rule over Cuba, since the perceived threat of American occupation and a territorial acquisition of Cuba by the United States might harm British trade and commercial interests within its own imperial possessions in the West Indies. However, after the United States made genuine assurances that it would grant Cuba's independence (which eventually occurred in 1902 under the terms dictated in the Platt Amendment), the British abandoned this policy and ultimately sided with the United States, unlike most other European powers who supported Spain. In return the US government supported Britain during the Boer War, although many Americans favoured the Boers.

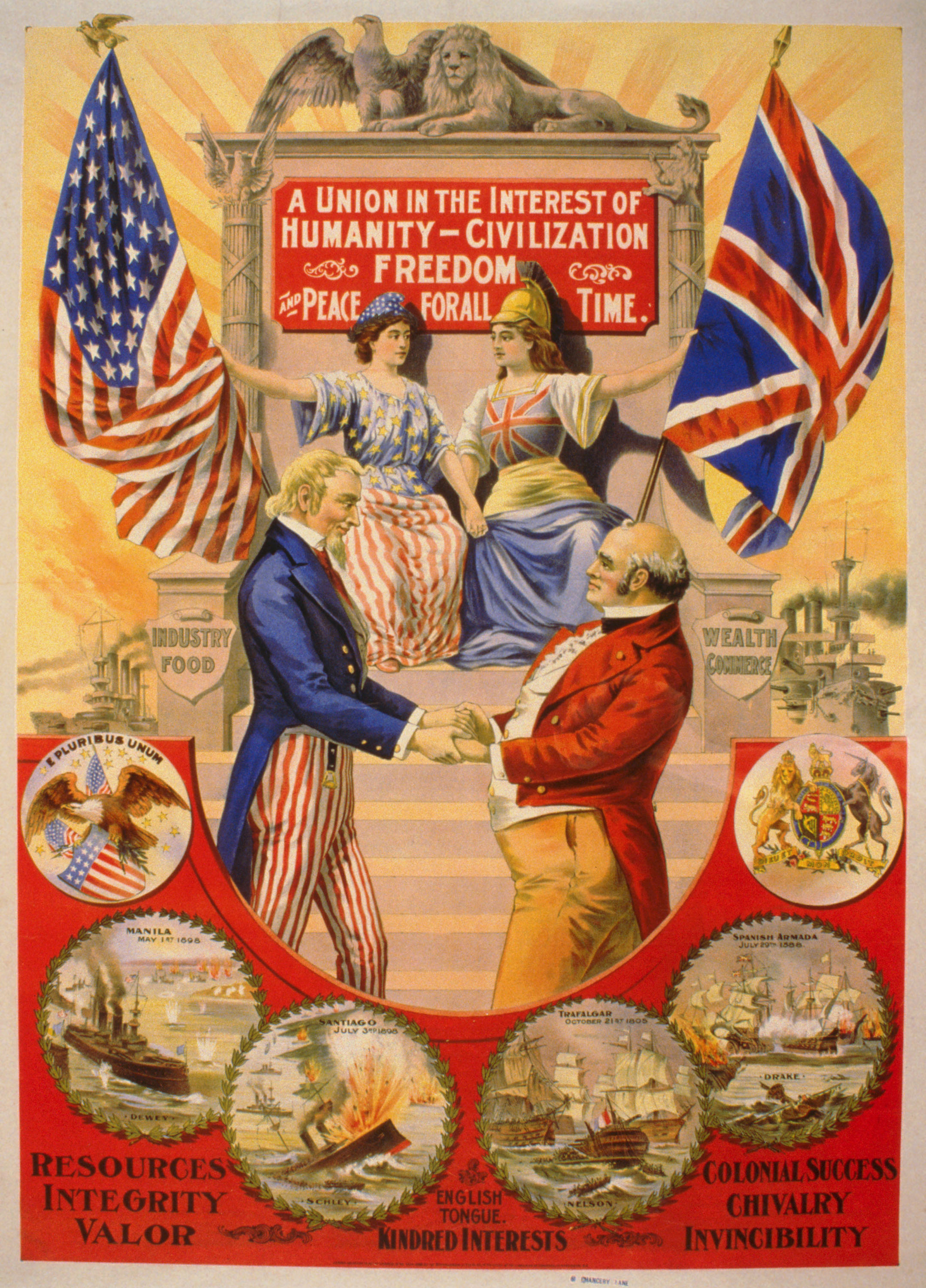
This 1898 depiction of the Great Rapprochement shows Uncle Sam embracing John Bull, while Columbia and Britannia sit together and hold hands.

In 2002, academic John Moser said that, although Anglophobia is now "almost completely absent" from American society, this was not always the case. He stated that "there were strains of Anglophobia present in virtually every populist movement of the late 19th and early 20th centuries," with the Populist Party, for example, "referring to England as a 'monster' that had 'seized upon the fresh energy of America and is steadily fixing its fangs into our social life.'"

Reasons suggested for the faltering of Anglophobia included the impact of the Second World War, and reduced political support for Irish nationalist movements compared with that in earlier periods. Moser also said:

In an age when the wealthiest and most influential Americans tended to be associated with things British—the vast majority were of Anglo-Saxon descent, wore English-tailored suits, drove British-made automobiles, and even spoke with affected British accents—it was quite natural for Great Britain to fall within the sights of disaffected populists. In more recent years, however, this has changed. When one thinks of wealth and influence in contemporary America, particularly when one considers those who have made their fortunes in the past thirty years, English culture does not immediately spring to mind.

The film industry is widely perceived to give a British nationality to a disproportionate number of villains.

==== Anglophobia in the Irish-American community ====
The Irish-American community in the United States has historically shown antipathy towards Britain for its role in controlling Ireland. The large Irish Catholic element provided a major base for demands for Irish independence, and occasioned anti-British rhetoric, especially at election time. Anglophobia thus has been a defining feature of the Irish-American experience. Bolstered by their support of Irish nationalism, Irish-American communities have been staunchly anti-English since the 1850s, and this sentiment is fostered within the Irish-American identity. Irish immigrants arrived poor and within a generation or two prospered. Many subscribed cash from their weekly wage to keep up the anti-English agitation. Anglophobia was a common theme in Democratic Party politics. Irish-American newspapers, like the pro-Catholic Truth Teller which was founded in 1825 by an anti-English priest, were influential in the identity of the community.

Anti-English feelings among Irish-Americans spread to American culture through Irish-American performers in popular blackface minstrel shows. These imparted both elements of the Irish-American performers' own national bias, and the popular stereotypical image that the English people were bourgeois, aloof, or upper class. Sentiments quickly turned into direct and violent action when in the 1860s the Fenian Brotherhood Society invaded Canada to provoke a United States-British war in hope it would lead to Irish independence. Violence is said to have included direct action by Fenian sympathisers, with the assassination of Thomas D'Arcy McGee, himself an Irish Canadian and Irish nationalist who was against the invasion, although he was very critical of the Orange Order, and it has long been suspected they were his true killers. Goldwin Smith, professor at Cornell University, wrote in the North American Review that "hatred of England" was used as a tool to win the Irish-American vote. A similar observation was made in 1900 by U.S. Secretary of State John Hay, who criticised the Prairie Populist and his own Democratic party's political pandering to attract the support of the Irish diaspora:

State conventions put on an anti-English plank in their platforms to curry favor with the Irish (whom they want to keep) and the Germans whom they want to seduce. It is too disgusting to have to deal with such sordid lies.

Well into the early 20th century anti-English sentiment was increasing with famine memorials in the Irish-American communities, which "served as a wellspring for their obsessive and often corrosive antipathy," as noted in the British Parliament in 1915:

There is no part of the world where anti-English influences worked so powerfully than in the United States. Almost every Irishman there is the son or grandson of an evicted tenant – evicted in all the horrors of the black 40s. And most of them have heard stories of them from their mother's knee.

Some newspapers, including the San Francisco Leader and the New York Irish World, first published in 1823, were renowned for their anti-English articles. The Irish World blamed the mainland United Kingdom for the depopulation and desolate state of Ireland's industries. One newspaper, the Gaelic American, called a student performance of the British national anthem by some girls of Irish heritage from a convent school an act of disloyalty, where they were taught to reverence the traditions of the hereditary enemy of their race and religion.

A commemorative stamp by philanthropist Andrew Carnegie on a century of peace between America and Great Britain was criticised by the Irish-American press. In recent years American political commentators, such as Pat Buchanan, have highlighted the anti-English stance of the Irish Diaspora in the United States of America.

=== Argentina ===
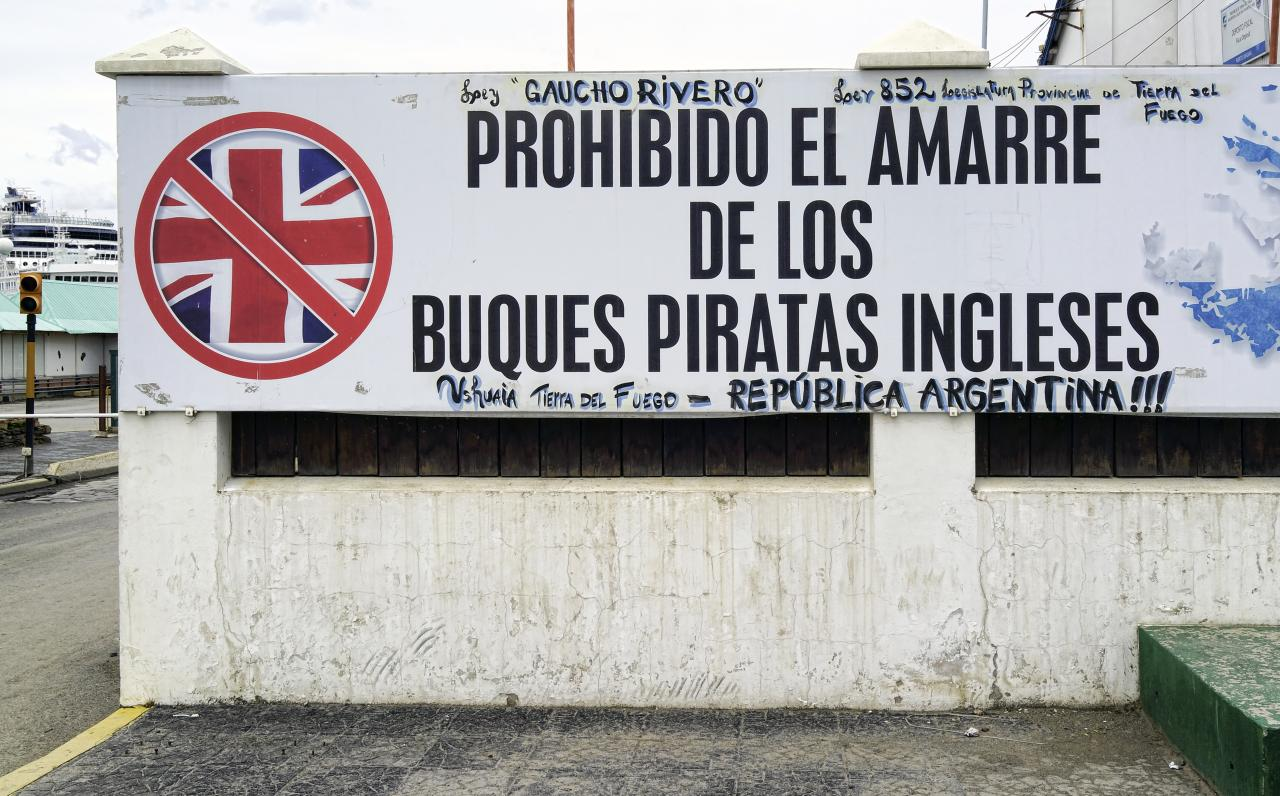
Sign in Ushuaia, Argentina: "Mooring by English pirates' ships is prohibited".

In 1982 the two countries fought a small short conflict in the Falklands War, decisively won by the UK. Relations have become friendly since then.

Anglophobia in Argentina has been studied by the historian Ema Cibotti in Dear Enemies. From Beresford to Maradona, the true story of relations between the English and Argentines. In its prologue, entitled "Against the English it is better", the social historian states

The anti-British sentiment is perhaps one of the most widespread and rooted in our idiosyncrasy, to the point that it has become flesh in football, our most popular sport. “Against the English it is better”, and “He who does not jump is English”, are slogans shouted by millions. Each success of the blue and white team is usually a reason for collective joy, but a victory against the English is much more; it vibrates the national spirit, no matter how dejected it may be at the time. The playing field becomes the stage where society claims the almost two hundred years of usurpation of the Malvinas Islands.

That feeling has not been constant or unanimous. Characters such as Manuel Belgrano, who had faced the English invasions of Buenos Aires in 1806 and 1807 or Mariano Moreno, among the independence leaders, supported policies similar to those of the British and the dispute over the Falkland Islands did not sour relations. The 1929 crisis and the coup that overthrew Hipólito Yrigoyen in 1930, with the fall in export prices, will be the determining factors in the appearance of an Anglophobic sentiment linked to the rejection of neo-colonialism or British imperialism. This is what the Spanish pedagogue Lorenzo Luzuriaga observed upon arriving in Argentina in 1940, who in a letter to Américo Castro analysed the different attitudes towards the outbreak of the World War

People here are very confused. On the one hand, there is economic Anglophobia about alleged British imperialism and exploitation; on the other, the Russophile extremists who have raised the banner of neutrality and indifference to the conflict; on the other, the Francophiles (Victoria Ocampo's group) who do not know what to do with the defection from France, and finally a small Anglophile minority, ready to help in the fight by all means.

Philosopher Mario Bunge, in an interview granted to Jorge Fontevecchia on May 4, 2008, collected in Reportajes 2, alluded to the spread of Anglophobic sentiment in the years of the conflict, explainable "because many of the companies had been owned by the English" and attributed to this feeling the approach to Nazism of Carlos Astrada, introducer of existentialist philosophy in Argentina. But it will be with the Falklands War in 1982 when Anglophobic sentiment spread to a good part of society.

=== India ===
Anglophobic sentiment in India is rooted in the colonial legacy of British rule, starting with the rule of the British East India Company and continuing under the British Raj. Oppressive and exploitative practices, the imposition of British culture, language, and education, along with economic policies that favoured British interests at the expense of Indian welfare, fuelled a sense of injustice and subjugation among Indians. Key events such as the Indian Rebellion of 1857, the Jallianwala Bagh massacre of 1919, and the economic hardships imposed by British policies during events like the Bengal famine of 1943 intensified this animosity. Post-independence, Anglophobia has persisted in various forms, often manifesting as resistance to Western cultural dominance and the lingering impact of colonial attitudes in modern Indian society. This historical context has fostered a complex relationship with the English language and British cultural elements, where they are both integrated into Indian society and simultaneously viewed with suspicion or disdain by some. The legacy of colonial exploitation has left a deep imprint on India's collective memory, contributing to a continued wariness of British influence in both political and cultural spheres.

== See also ==
- Anglophile
- Racism
- Anti-Canadian sentiment § Quebec - where anti-Anglophone sentiment is often described as Anglophobia
- List of phobias
- Perfidious Albion
- Views of Lyndon LaRouche and the LaRouche movement
- Stereotypes of British people
