= More German than the Germans =

Phrase describing Jews in pre-war Germany

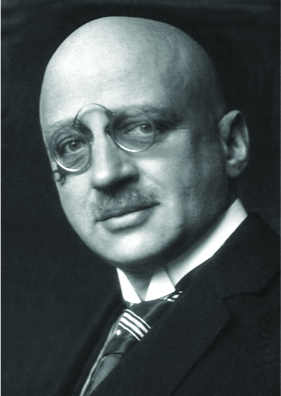
Fritz Haber, whose work in the sphere of WW1 chemical warfare was later used to develop Zyklon B

"More German than the Germans" was a satirical or pejorative phrase used to describe the extreme degree of cultural assimilation among German Jews prior to World War II and the Holocaust. Originally, the comment was a "common sneer aimed at people" who had "thrown off the faith of their forefathers and adopted the garb of their Fatherland". The German assimilation, following the Enlightenment, was "unprecedented". The quote is sometimes ascribed to Chaim Weizmann.

== Background ==
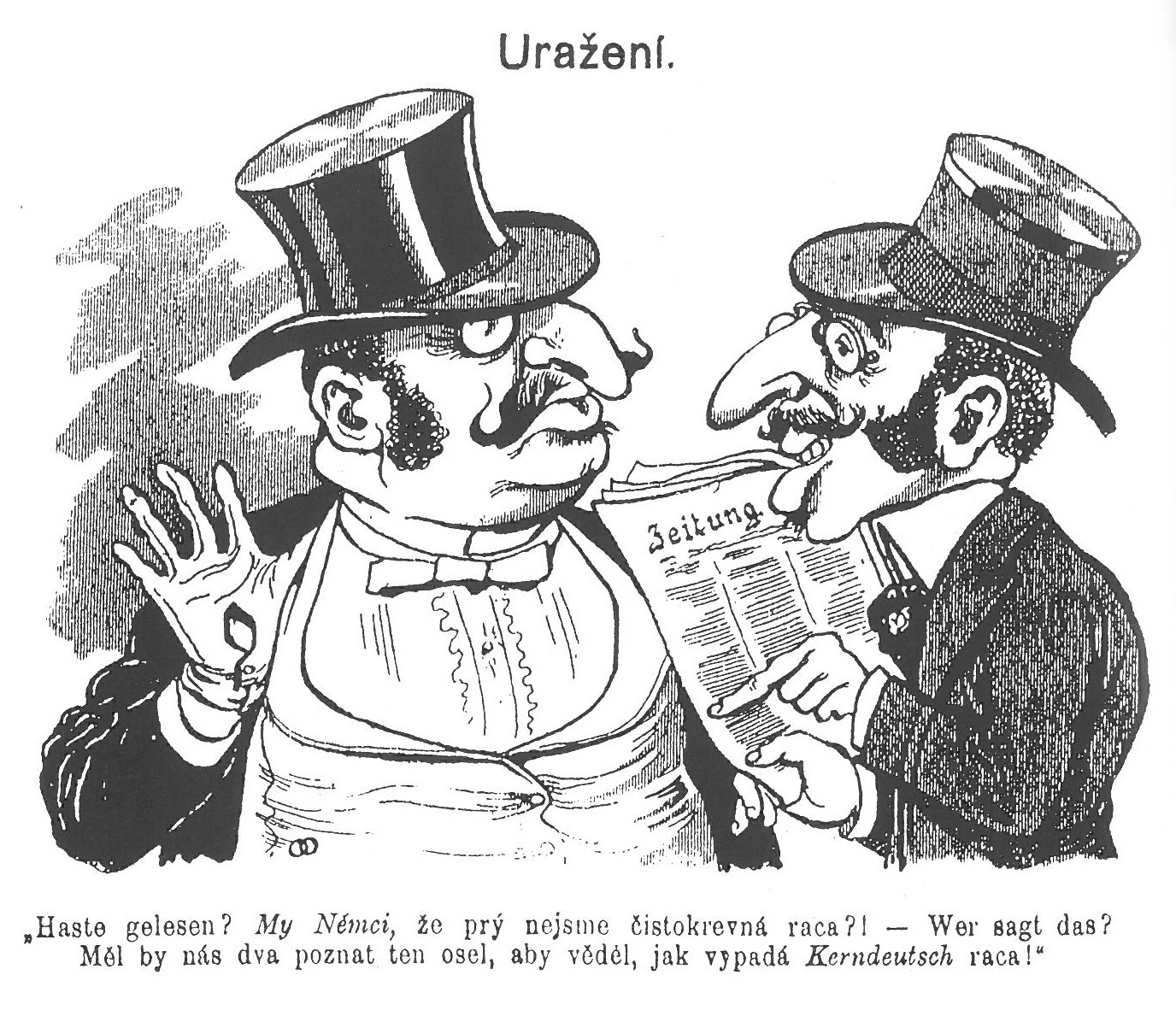
Czech caricature from 1904. Translation: Offended. Have you read? We, Germans, are not the pure-blooded race?! – Who says that? If that donkey saw us two, he would know the appearance of the Kerndeutsch (core German) race! In Bohemia too, Jews were perceived as trying to become more German than the Germans; they mainly spoke German.

Following the Enlightenment, many European Jews regarded Germany as a particularly desirable place to live, "a place of refuge, in comparison to Russia and Romania" where antisemitism was extremely virulent and violent, and even France, where the Enlightenment had begun. German Jews began to immerse themselves in German culture and the arts, playing a full and even leading role in society. By the twentieth century, the German Jews had reached a state of Bildung und Besitz (i.e., cultivation and wealth).

== Forming a German-Jewish identity ==
Jewish women played a major role in the process of forming German-Jewish identity. Since they understood that Jews can hold both Jewish and national identities, Jewish women raised loyal families to Germany in the Imperial era. They served as mediators of Bildung within their homes and families, while simultaneously serving as agents of tradition. Many Jewish women continued to keep kosher homes, attend synagogue on the Sabbath, and perform other Jewish rituals. In this light, Jews could be regular men and women on the streets and Jews in their homes, as suggested by Enlightenment advocator Yehuda Leib Gordon.

Furthermore, Jewish women were instrumental in forming the social positions of Jews and their sense of "Germanness." They encouraged their children to acculturate through their dress, speech and education and appreciated German entertainment and literature. Jewish women sent their children to music lessons and advanced secular schools. Thus, by combining German bourgeois practice and Jewish heritage, they formed a German-Jewish identity that balanced integration and tradition. Jewish women helped their families look, act, and feel like other Germans while remaining Jewish. Their actions allowed Jews to ultimately receive the description of being "more German than the Germans."

== Examples ==
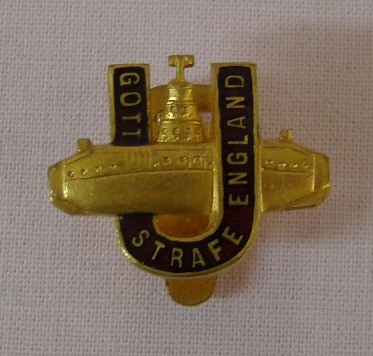
A pin with the slogan Gott strafe England (may God punish England), created by the Jew Ernst Lissauer

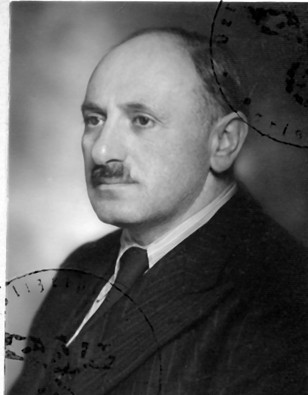
Julius Hirsch, player for the Nationalmannschaft, World War I veteran decorated with the Iron Cross, deported to Auschwitz in 1943

Kurt Singer (born 1885, died 1944 in Theresienstadt concentration camp), was a conductor, musician, musicologist, and neurologist. He was described by his daughter as "more German than the Germans", as he earned an Iron Cross for his gallantry in World War I, was music editor for a Berlin newspaper, and published research on German folk songs, Richard Wagner and Anton Bruckner.

British scholar Nikolaus Pevsner was described as "more German than the Germans" for his support of Goebbels' drive for "pure non-decadent German art" and was reported as saying, of the Nazis in 1933, "I want this movement to succeed. There is no alternative but chaos ... there are things worse than Hitlerism".

German Jew Betty Lipton described German-Jewish identity after emancipation in "At Home in Berlin." She wrote that her family kept a kosher home, attended synagogue, and was a part of Berlin's tight-knit Jewish community. Simultaneously, her family was loyal to Germany. In 1914, they displayed the largest black, white, and red flag on their whole street. This short account portrays why Jewish families were often described as "more German than the Germans."

Julius Hirsch, who was convinced the Nazis would not harm him as he had fought valiantly in the Imperial German Army for four years (for which he had been awarded the Iron Cross) and had played for the Germany national football team. He was ultimately proven wrong: the ultimate award for his services to the nation was his deportation to the Auschwitz concentration camp on 1 March 1943. Although there is no record of his death date, in the absence of any signs of life hereafter, it is assumed he did not survive the war. He had divorced his non-Jewish wife in the hope of saving her and his children from Nazi persecution, but his half-Jewish children were ultimately also deported to Theresienstadt in February 1945; unlike their father they survived the war, as they were liberated by the Allies in May 1945.

Fritz Haber, a German-Jewish chemist who in 1918 received (together with Carl Bosch) the Nobel Prize for Chemistry for the invention of the Haber-Bosch process, a key ingredient for the production of modern fertilizers; It is estimated that one-third of annual global food production uses ammonia from the Haber–Bosch process, and that this supports nearly half of the world's population.

However, Haber, a known German nationalist, is also known for his work weaponizing chlorine, and he led the team developing gases used for chemical warfare in World War I. A downside of his work however is the invention of Zyklon B, the main gas used in extermination camp gas chambers during the Holocaust.

But perhaps the literary epitome of this trope would be Ernst Lissauer, a German-Jewish poet and dramatist who is most remembered for the anti-British slogan Gott strafe England ("may God punish England") during World War I. He also wrote the poem Hassgesang gegen England (lit. "Hate song against England", better known as "Hymn of Hate"). Lissauer was described as a passionate German nationalist, with Stefan Zweig penning that "Germany was his world and the more Germanic anything was, the more it delighted him." He was ultimately forced into self-exile in Austria when the Nazis came to power in 1933, and in 1936 he wrote about himself: "To the Germans I am a Jew masked as a German; to the Jew a German faithless to Israel."

== See also ==
- Jewish assimilation
- More Irish than the Irish themselves
- The stab-in-the-back myth, a contrasting German antisemitic trope
