= Old Fox (disambiguation) =

Old fox is a term used by some Iranians to describe the United Kingdom.

Old Fox may also refer to:

- Old Fox (film), a 2023 Taiwanese film
- The Old Fox, a German crime drama series
- Giuseppe Morello, also known as "The Old Fox", the first boss of the Morello crime family
