= More Irish than the Irish themselves =

Irish phrase describing cultural assimilation of Norman invaders into Gaelic society

"More Irish than the Irish themselves" (Irish: Níos Gaelaí ná na Gaeil féin; Latin: Hiberniores Hibernis ipsis) is a phrase used in Irish historiography to describe a phenomenon of cultural assimilation in late medieval Norman Ireland.

== History ==
The descendants of Anglo-Norman lords who had settled in Ireland in the 12th century had been significantly Gaelicised by the end of the Middle Ages, forming septs and clans after the indigenous Gaelic pattern, and became known as the Gall or "Old English" (contrasting with the "New English" arriving with the Tudor conquest of Ireland). The Statutes of Kilkenny, 1366, complained that " ... now many English of the said land, forsaking the English language, manners, mode of riding, laws and usages, live and govern themselves according to the manners, fashion, and language of the Irish enemies".

In 1596 the Elizabethan poet Edmund Spenser (c. 1552–13 January 1599) whilst employed as part of the English administration in Ireland, paraphrased the saying in his controversial treatise, A View of the Present State of Irelande. In the treatise, the characters Eudoxus and Irenius discuss how those sent over by King Henry II of England to colonise Ireland, eventually became more Irish in outlook than the Irish themselves

.......

"Eudoxus: What is that you say, of so many as remayne Englishe of them? Why are, not they that were once English, abydinge Englishe still?

Irenius: No, for the most parte of them are degenerated and growen almost meare Irishe, yea, and more malicious to the Englishe then the very Irish them selves"

.....

The phrase (in Latin) was used by the Irish priest and historian John Lynch (c1599–1677) in his work Cambrensis Eversus. He was strongly influenced by the writings of the historian Geoffrey Keating (1569 – c. 1644), whose History of Ireland he translated into Latin. Cambrensis Eversus was translated from the Latin, with notes and observations, by Theophilus O'Flanagan, Dublin, 1795.

== Eighteenth-century use ==
John Henry Wilson, in his Sketch of Jonathan Swift (1804), wrote that Swift used the phrase (Hiberniores Hibernis ipsis) in a discussion with his landlord.

== Nineteenth-century use ==
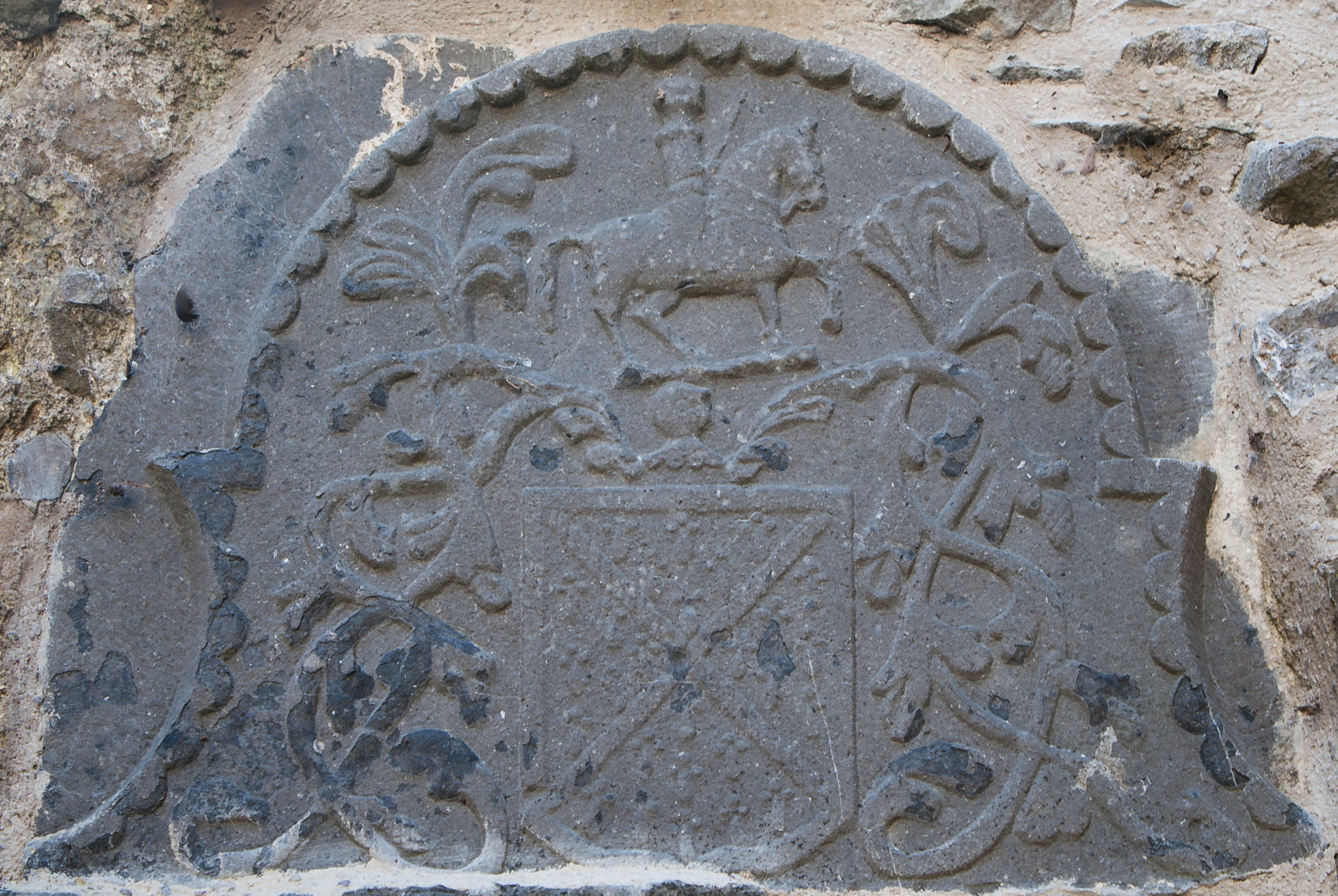
Relief of coat of arms of the FitzGerald of Desmond in Buttevant Friary. The 3rd Earl of Desmond (known in Irish as Gearóid Iarla) was a prime example of the Gaelicisation of the 'Hiberno-Normans'.

The phrase remained in use by romantic nineteenth-century nationalists to promote the common Irishness of 'Planter and Gael'. An example is found in the 1844 poem by the Young Irelander, Thomas Davis, called 'The Geraldines', which concerns the FitzGerald dynasty:

.......

These Geraldines! These Geraldines! -not long our air they breathed;
Not long they fed on venison, in Irish water seethed;
Not often had their children been by Irish mothers nursed;
when from their full and genial hearts an Irish feeling burst!
The English monarch strove in vain, by law, and force, and bribe,
To win from Irish thoughts and ways this 'more than Irish' tribe;
For still they clung to fosterage, to breitheamh, cloak and bard:
What king dare say to Geraldine, 'Your Irish wife discard'?

.....

== Modern use ==
The phrase remains in common use, both colloquially and in the media, in reference to recent immigration and assimilation in Ireland, and to some degree about some of the Irish diaspora (for example in The Irish Times, Senator Jim Walsh, Liam Twomey, or Irish Emigrant) or in conversation discussing the relationship between the cultural heritage of the Irish diaspora and the Irish in Ireland. While still echoing its original meaning, contemporary usage of the phrase usually takes a more open interpretation of assimilation or, in the case of the diaspora, the maintenance of Irish heritage.

Debates of the Oireachtas demonstrate the age and range of contemporary applications of the phrase. Either when discussing the diaspora:

I do not think this country will afford sufficient allurements to the citizens of other States ... The children of Irish parents born abroad are sometimes more Irish than the Irish themselves, and they would come with added experience and knowledge to our country....

Or, more light-heartedly, on assimilation:

... [As] in olden times the attractiveness of Irish life made the Norman invaders ... 'Hiberniores Hibernicis ipsis', 'more Irish than the Irish themselves', so the charms of Galway, experienced through 25 happy years, have made a woman, born in one of the severed counties, feel entitled to describe herself as 'Galviensior Galviensibus ipsis' – 'more Galwegian than the Galwegians themselves'.

However, S. J. Connolly has written, "The descendants of the English conquerors, it was confidently proclaimed, had become 'more Irish than the Irish themselves'. Today it is recognized that the supposedly contemporary phrase dates only from the late eighteenth century, the Latin form (Hiberniores ipsis Hibernis) sometimes used to give it an authentic medieval ring from later still."

== See also ==
- More German than the Germans
- Plastic Paddy
- West Brit – a somewhat opposite expression
