= Adib Pishavari =

Indian-Iranian Muslim scholar (1844–1930)

- ادیب پیشاوری
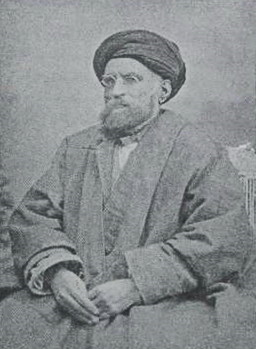
- Pishavari, c. 1910s–1920s

Personal life
- Born: 1844 Peshawar, Sikh Empire
- Died: 30 June 1930 (aged 85–86) Tehran, Pahlavi Iran
- Resting place: Imamzadeh Abdollah, Tehran
- Notable work(s): Qaysaria
- Known for: Coining the term old fox
- Occupation: Scholar; poet

Religious life
- Religion: Shia Islam
- Denomination: Twelver
- Philosophy: Adab and hikmah
- Lineage: Shihab al-Din 'Umar al-Suhrawardi

Senior posting
- Based in: Afghanistan; Iran
- Influenced by: Hadi Sabzavari

Seyyed Ahmad Adib Pishavari (Persian: ادیب پیشاوری), also known as Sayyed Ahmad B. Sehab al-Din Razawi (1844 – 30 June 1930), was a Sufi scholar who was born in or near Peshawar in modern-day Pakistan, and was descended from Omar Sohravardi. Adib was a master of Persian literature.

When Adib was a young man, his father and several other relatives were killed in action while fighting in the Anglo-Persian War. For this reason, Adib relocated to Kabul and later Ghazni to complete his early education. He moved to Iran in 1877 and enrolled at the madrasa of Molla Hadi Sabzevari in Sabzavr, where he was exposed to advanced philosophical lectures. Motivated by the death of his father and other relatives in the Anglo-Persian War, Adib developed an intense Anglophobia and was frequently critical of British foreign policy in the Middle East; in his writings, Adib likened the United Kingdom to several animals such as an "old fox", "ominous raven", and a "venomous viper".

== Early life and education ==
According to some, Adib Pishavari was born in a mountain village between Afghanistan and Peshawar, British India, while others say he was born in Peshawar. His father Seyyed Shah Baba and his predecessors were Sufiya nobility. After Adib's father and several relatives were killed in action while fighting in the Anglo-Persian War, he moved to Kabul and then Ghaznin, where he learnt etiquette and wisdom.

Adib went to Mashhad to complete his education, and then attended Hadi Sabzavari in Sabzevar for his final two years of schooling. In 1921, Adib moved to Tehran at the suggestion of Saeed Khan Garmroudi, the Iranian foreign minister in charge of Astan Quds. Adib never married; he remained in Tehran until his death in 1930, and was interred in Ray, Iran.

== Works and ideologies ==
Adib Pishavari was one of the most important writers in Iran of his time due to his extensive knowledge of science, his competence in Persian and Arabic, and his exceptional recall. His poetic collection contains approximately 20,000 couplets. The collection, which was released three years after his death, consists mainly of ghazals and qasidas, and has 370 Arabic and 4,200 Persian verses. In addition, he wrote Qaysarnama, a protracted mathnavi honouring Kaiser Wilhelm II and praising the German Empire's participation in World War I. Despite being a member of an older generation of poets, Adib supported fresh social and political perspectives, as did his younger contemporaries. Adib thus contributed to the development of nationalistic impulses in Persian poetry.

Adib's father and his numerous relatives were killed in action during the Anglo-Persian War. As a result, Adib developed an intense Anglophobia and was frequently critical of British foreign policy in the Middle East; in his writings, Adib likened the United Kingdom to several animals such as an "old fox", "ominous raven", and a "venomous viper". The "old fox" epithet continues to be used in Iran, particularly among Iranian right-wingers. One of Adib's poems reads:

Many an ancient house
Was razed after you crept in
You seized lands through your fox games
You have escaped hundred of traps, like an old fox

— Adib Pishavari

== See also ==
- Muhammad Iqbal
