= Ernst Lissauer =

German poet and dramatist (1882–1937)

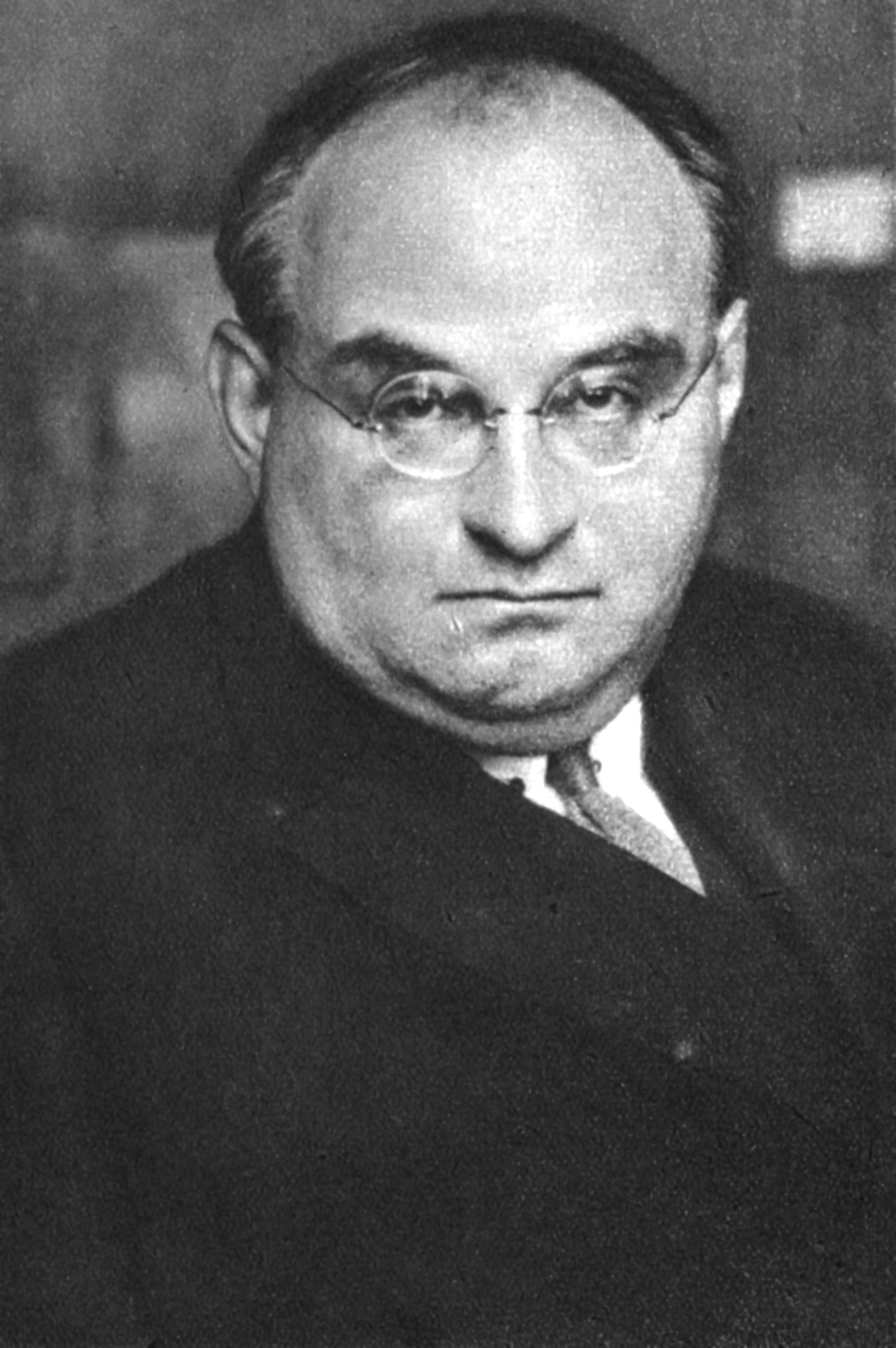
Ernst Lissauer c. 1932

Ernst Lissauer (16 December 1882 – 10 December 1937) was a German poet and dramatist best known for coining the anti-British slogan Gott strafe England during World War I. He also wrote the Hassgesang gegen England ("Song of hate against England").

== Biography ==
Lissauer was "a round little man, a jolly face above a double double-chin, bubbling over with self-importance and exuberance," according to his friend Stefan Zweig. He was a committed nationalist and a devotee of the Prussian tradition as well as an ambitious poet. Zweig said of him: "Germany was his world and the more Germanic anything was, the more it delighted him." His devotion to German history, poetry, art and music was, in his own words, a monomania; it only increased with the outbreak of World War I, when he penned his hate song. German Emperor Wilhelm II decorated him with the Order of the Red Eagle. Crown Prince Rupprecht of Bavaria ordered it printed on leaflets and distributed to every soldier in the army.

He came under attack by the vigorous anti-Semitic movement of the day for expressing such "fanatical hatred", which they considered "unreasonable", "utterly un-German", and "characteristic of nothing so much as the Jewish race". Houston Stewart Chamberlain claimed that the Teutonic German did not "wallow in Old Testament hate." Over in England, Arthur Conan Doyle said in his book The German War: "This sort of thing is, it must be admitted, very painful and odious. It fills us with a mixture of pity and disgust, and we feel as if – instead of a man – we were really fighting with a furious, screaming woman."

Lissauer himself came to regret writing the Hassgesang, refusing to allow it to be printed in school text books. After the war he said that his poem was born out of the mood of the times, and that he did not really mean it to be taken seriously. In 1926 he said that rather than writing a hymn of hate against England it would have been better if he written a hymn of love for Germany.

Lissauer attempted to balance two traditions, one Jewish and the other German, at a time when history was forcing them apart. The Third Reich's advent forced him to flee his native land for Austria. In 1936, then living in Vienna, he wrote: "To the Germans I am a Jew masked as a German; to the Jew a German faithless to Israel."

== See also ==
- More German than the Germans
