= Perfidious Albion =

Pejorative epithet for Great Britain

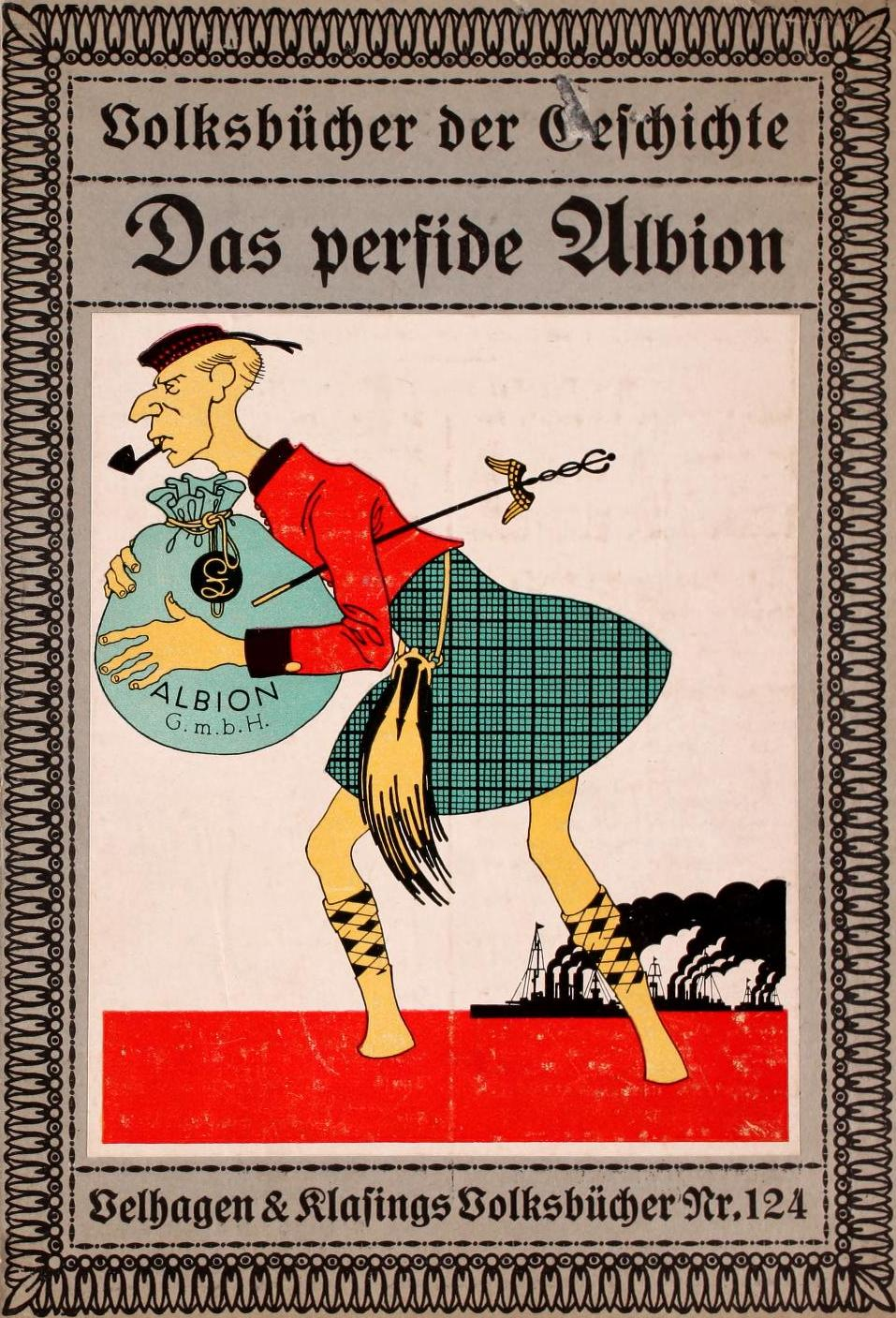
A WWI-era German propaganda history magazine invoking the "Perfidious Albion" trope

Perfidious Albion is a pejorative phrase used within the context of international relations diplomacy to refer to acts of diplomatic slights, duplicity, treachery and hence infidelity (with respect to perceived promises made to or alliances formed with other nation states) by monarchs or governments of the United Kingdom (or Great Britain prior to 1801, or England prior to 1707) in their pursuit of self-interest and the expansion of the British Empire. Perfidious means not keeping one's faith or word (from the Latin word perfidia); Albion is an ancient and now poetic name for Great Britain.

== Origins and use ==
The use of the adjective "perfidious" to describe England has a long history; instances have been found as far back as the 13th century. A very similar phrase was used in a sermon by 17th-century French bishop and theologian Jacques-Bénigne Bossuet:

'L'Angleterre, ah, la perfide Angleterre,
que le rempart de ses mers rendoit
inaccessible aux Romains,
la foi du Sauveur y est abordée.

Translation:

England, oh perfidious England,
whose sea ramparts made her
unreachable to the Romans,
now receives the true faith.

The coinage of the phrase in its current form is conventionally attributed to Augustin Louis de Ximénès, a French-Spanish playwright who wrote it in a poem entitled "L'Ère des Français", published in 1793:

Attaquons dans ses eaux la perfide Albion.

Translation:

Let us attack perfidious Albion in her waters.

In this context, Great Britain's perfidy was political. In the early days of the French Revolution, when the revolution aimed at establishing a liberal constitutional monarchy along British lines, many in Great Britain had looked upon the Revolution with mild favour. Diminishing the threat that Royalist France posed to British interests was an additional factor encouraging support for the new regime. However, following the turn of the revolution to republicanism with the overthrow and execution of Louis XVI, Britain, concerned that revolutionary fervor might spread to other countries, had allied itself with the other absolutist monarchies of Europe against the Revolution in France. This was seen by the revolutionaries in France as a "perfidious" betrayal.

La perfide Albion became a stock expression in France in the 19th century, to the extent that the Goncourt brothers could refer to it as "a well-known old saying". It was utilised by French journalists whenever there were tensions between France and Britain, for example during the competition for colonies in Africa, culminating in the Fashoda Incident. The catch-phrase was further popularized by its use in La Famille Fenouillard, the first French comic strip, in which one of the characters fulminates against "Perfidious Albion, which burnt Joan of Arc on the rock of Saint Helena". (This sentence mixes two major incidents in French history that can be related to the UK's perfidy: Joan of Arc, whose execution may have been due to English influence; and Napoleon, who died in exile on Saint Helena. He may have died by being poisoned, according to the Swedish toxicologist Sten Forshufvud. But it has been speculated that the use of arsenic as a dye hastened Napoleon's death.)

In German-speaking areas, the term das perfide Albion became increasingly frequent, especially during the rule of the German Empire (1871–1918) against the backdrop of rising British-German tensions.

=== Examples of usage ===
- The term often refers to the Kingdom of England reneging on the Treaty of Limerick of 1691, which ended the Williamite War between the predominantly Roman Catholic Jacobite forces and the English forces loyal to William of Orange, giving favourable terms to the Irish Catholics, including the freedoms to worship, to own property and to carry arms, but those terms were soon repudiated by the Penal Laws of 1695.
- The Irish ballad "The Foggy Dew" includes the term in its lyrics. The song concerns the Easter Rising and the hypocrisy that England is concurrently fighting World War I so that "Small Nations might be free", while Ireland's struggle for freedom is forcibly suppressed.
- In Portugal, the term was widely used after the 1890 British Ultimatum, after Cecil Rhodes' opposition to the Pink Map. Portugal and England had been allied since 1386.
- Bastiat uses the term sarcastically in his satirical letter "The Candlemakers' Petition", first published in 1845.
- The Italian term perfida Albione (perfidious Albion) was used in the propaganda of Fascist Italy to criticise the global dominion of the British Empire. Fascist propaganda depicted the British as ruthless colonialists, who exploited foreign lands and peoples to feed extravagant lifestyle habits like eating "five meals a day". The term was used frequently in Italian politics after the Second Italo-Abyssinian War, because despite having gained large colonial territories for itself, Britain approved of trade sanctions in the wake of Italian aggression against Ethiopia. The sanctions were depicted as an attempt to deny Italy its "rightful" colonial dominions, while at the same time, Britain was trying to extend its own influence and authority. The same term was used after World War I related to the so-called mutilated victory.
- During the Vichy French regime, Philippe Pétain made frequent use of the term "blood-soaked Perfidious Albion" and described the UK as the relentless "eternal enemy" of France. Such sentiments were exacerbated by the British Attack on Mers-el-Kébir, which caused great bitterness in France and went a great way towards reinforcing the perfidious stereotype.
- The father of Israeli novelist Amos Oz wrote pamphlets for the Irgun that attacked "perfidious Albion" during the British rule in Palestine.
- After their victory against England at the 1950 World Cup, the president of the Spanish Football Federation (Armando Muñoz Calero) sent a telegram to Spanish dictator Francisco Franco that read, "we have beaten Perfidious Albion."
- It is used by Ian Smith in his memoirs (The Great Betrayal, 1997) to describe his opposition on the British handling of Rhodesian independence.
- In his book I'm Not the Only One (2004), British politician George Galloway expressed the opinion that Kuwait is "clearly a part of the greater Iraqi whole, stolen from the motherland by perfidious Albion".
- In 2012, Fabian Picardo, the Chief Minister of Gibraltar, used the phrase to describe the UK government's position on the UN Decolonisation Committee: "Perfidious Albion, for this reason ... The position of the United Kingdom is as usual so nuanced that it's difficult to see where they are on the spectrum, but look that's what Britain's like and we all love being British".
- The term was used in reference to a possible United Kingdom withdrawal from the European Union in the run up to the referendum on the issue in 2016. An article in the French newspaper Le Parisien claimed that a poll showing that only 54% of French people supported UK membership of the EU (compared to 55% of British people) showed that "the British will always be seen as the Perfidious Albion". In contrast, the editor of the Financial Times, Lionel Barber, has written that "Too many people in the UK are under the illusion that most European countries cannot wait to see the back of perfidious Albion." Eventually, the United Kingdom voted to leave the EU.
- In arguing for a "hard" Brexit, and the EU rejecting a possible extension requested by the UK of the deadline to leave the EU, the Brexit-supporting British MP Mark Francois said to the Bruges Group in April 2019: "My message to the European Council ... If you now try to hold on to us against our will, you will be facing Perfidious Albion on speed. It would therefore be much better for all our sakes if we were to pursue our separate destinies, in a spirit of mutual respect."

== See also ==
- Anti-British sentiment
- Perfidy
- Western betrayal
- Old fox

Other places

- Axis of evil
- Great Satan
- Prison of peoples
- Yellow Peril
