= Augustin Louis de Ximénès =

French poet and playwright (1728–1817)

Augustin-Louis, marquis de Ximénès (28 February 1728, Paris – 1 June 1817) was an 18th-century French poet and playwright.

== Biography ==
Born in a family from the Kingdom of Aragon, he began his career in the army, where he joined the "Grey Musketeers" (mousquetaires gris), and later the gendarmes of French Flanders. After he was appointed maréchal de Saxe's aide de camp, he fought at his side in the battle of Fontenoy, and then retired from the service with the rank of mestre de camp.

Ximénès had his first tragedy, Selim, presented in 1746. The second, Épicaris, ou la Mort de Néron, was hissed to the bitter end and had only one performance. The third, Amalazonte , had no more success and earned him the epigram imitated from Boileau: "After Épicaris / Laughters; / After Amalazonte / Shame." The failure of Don Carlos, which he presented at his own expense in Lyon in 1761 ended his stage career.

Known for his loose morals and for his gallantry, he was equally famous for his ugliness and his extraordinary uncleanliness. Having won the favor of Voltaire, he was familiarly received in Ferney, until Ximenes stole the manuscript of his Histoire de la guerre de 1741. Voltaire nevertheless consented to receive him again a few years later, on condition that he would sign for him a pamphlet against Jean-Jacques Rousseau. This pamphlet was long considered to be Ximénès'

In 1768, he married Angélique Honorée Jourdan, daughter of the writer Jean-Baptiste Jourdan.

He proclaimed to be a supporter of the Revolution and during the Reign of Terror took the name of Dean of sans-culottes poets, which he later changed into that of dean of the tragic poets. An occasional poet, he successively published verses to the Republic, to Bonaparte, who gave him a pension, and Louis XVIII, who gave him the Cross of Order of Saint Louis. During his long career, he continuously, but in vain, was a candidate to the Académie française.

Augustin-Louis de Ximénès authored the expression perfidious Albion. It is to be found in his poem L'Ère des Français, published in 1793, where there is that verse: Let us attack perfidious Albion in her waters !

== Publications ==
Poetry

- 1750: Les Lettres ont autant contribué à la gloire de Louis XIV qu'il avoit contribué à leurs progrès, poème (1750)
- 1759: Lettres portugaises en vers
- 1759: César au sénat romain
- 1769: Poème sur l'amour des lettres
- 1784: Discours en vers, à la louange de M. de Voltaire, suivi de quelques autres poésies et précédé d'une lettre de M. de Voltaire à l'auteur
- 1792: Codicille d'un vieillard, ou Poésies nouvelles
- 1806: Choix de poésies anciennes ou inédites
- 1807: Aux mânes de Voltaire
- undated:Stances sur le mariage de Napoléon, empereur des Français et roi d'Italie, avec l'archiduchesse Marie-Louise d'Autriche

Theatre

- 1746: Selim, tragedy, Paris, Théâtre de Monsieur, 8 December
- 1752: Épicaris, ou la Mort de Néron, tragedy, Paris, Théâtre-Français, 2 January
- 1754: Amalazonte, tragedy, Paris, Théâtre-Français, 30 May
- 1761: Dom Carlos, tragedy in 5 acts and in verse, Théâtre de Lyon, 5 May

Varia

- 1750: Électre vengée, ou Lettre sur les tragédies d'Oreste et d'Électre
- 1758: Lettre à monsieur Rousseau sur l'effet moral des théâtres Text online
- 1759: Le Péché originel, ou Réponse d'un rabbin aux doutes de la belle Allemande, traduite par elle-même
- 1768: L'Examen impartial des meilleures tragédies de Racine
- 1787: De l'Influence de Boileau sur l'esprit de son siècle
- 1787: Mon testament, en vers et en prose
- 1810: Nunc dimittis d'un vieillard

== Sources ==
- Pierre Larousse, Grand Dictionnaire universel du XIXe siècle, vol. XV, 1876, (p. 1401).
