= Lorenzo Luzuriaga =

Lorenzo Lulzuriaga
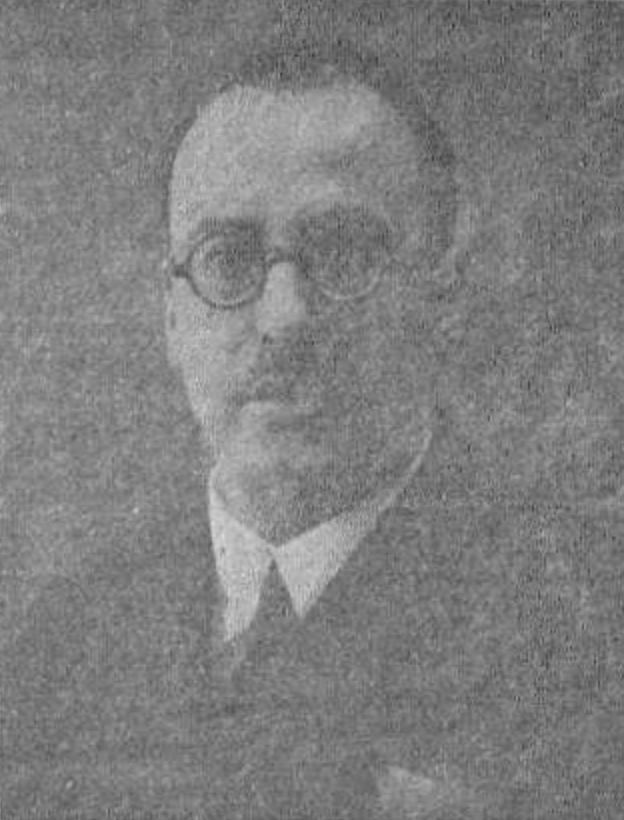
- Lorenzo Luzuriaga

Lorenzo Luzuriaga is a Spanish educationalist. While in exile in Argentina following the Spanish Civil War, Luzuriaga translated several works by John Dewey and popularized the figure amongst progressives.
