= Old fox =

Anti-British epithet used in Iran

"Old fox" (Iranian Persian: روباه پیر, romanized: rubâh-e pir) is a term used by some Iranians to describe the United Kingdom. In Iranian and many other traditions, the fox is known as a sly and cunning animal, and therefore has often been used as a metaphor for a cunning person who achieves goals through trickery rather than simply by force. In the context of Iranian attitudes to the United Kingdom, the term was first used by the philosopher and poet Adib Pishavari (1844–1930). When Pishavari was young, his father and relatives were killed in the war between the United Kingdom and Iran in 1857–58. Pishavari later wrote many poems expressing his anti-British sentiment, often representing the United Kingdom using animal metaphors, such as "old fox", "ominous raven" and "venomous viper".

Many an ancient house
Was razed after you crept in
You seized lands through your fox games
You have escaped hundreds of traps, like an old fox.

— English translation of a poem by Pishavari, via the BBC

Iranians' use of "old fox" may express personal opposition to the Persian Constitutional Revolution, support for the 1921 coup d'état, tension between the two nations during the Abadan Crisis (which led to British support for the 1953 coup d'état), British opposition to the Iranian Revolution, or allegations that Britain instigated street riots after the 2009 Iranian presidential election. When the British embassy reopened in 2015, Iranian media and newspapers declared and reported Return of the Fox. Hemayat wrote on its front page "The old fox arrived with its lights turned off", Resalat wrote "No-one is happy with the return of the old fox", and Kayhan wrote "In Iran's eyes, Britain is still the 'old fox'".

== See also ==
- Anti-British sentiment
- "Perfidious Albion"
- "Great Satan"
- "Little Satan"
