= Ordinance of Normandy =

The Ordinance of Normandy is the name given to a paper attributed to Philip VI of France, dated 23 March 1338 and exhibited in the Parliament of England on 8 September 1346. The document called for a second Norman conquest of England, with an invading army led by the Duke of Normandy (later king John II of France), and England was to be divided between the Duke of Normandy and his nobles as a fief for the King of France. It would have been discovered by the English army at Caen, following the Battle of Caen in 1346 that ensued from the English invasion of Normandy. The Earl of Huntingdon brought the document to England after he was invalided home and it was read out in St. Paul's Cathedral in London by the Archbishop of Canterbury, John de Stratford. The document was also exhibited in Parliament on 8 September 1346, which was summoned to vote supplies to the king, who was engaged in the Siege of Calais. It was claimed that King Philip vowed to "destruire & anientier tote la Nation & la Lange Engleys" [destroy and ruin the entire English nation and country]. (Note: In Medieval French, the word langue/lange is used for a linguistic community and people or the territory where a language is spoken, as for the langues of the Knights Hospitaller.) However some scholars believe the letter to have been forged.
