= Anti-British sentiment =

Prejudice against the United Kingdom, British people and British culture

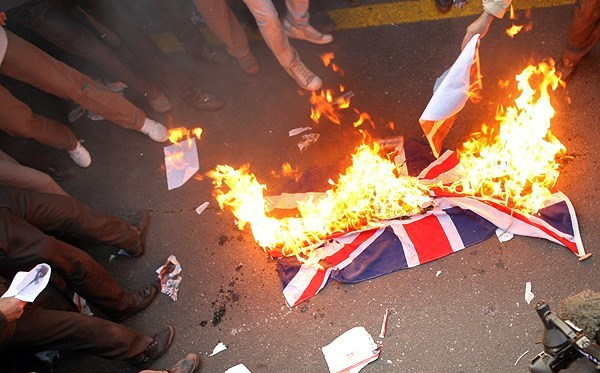
Protesters burning the flag of the United Kingdom during the 2011 attack on the British Embassy in Iran

Results of 2017 BBC World Service poll Views of the United Kingdom's influence by country (sorted by net positive, Pos – Neg)
Country polled	Pos.	Neg.	Neutral	Pos – Neg
Turkey	34%	47%	19%	-13
Pakistan	20%	29%	51%	-9
Spain	34%	42%	24%	-8
Russia	24%	32%	44%	-8
Brazil	33%	39%	28%	-6
Peru	41%	29%	30%	+12
India	33%	20%	47%	+13
Germany	35%	18%	47%	+17
Greece	42%	22%	34%	+20
France	63%	32%	5%	+31
Mexico	53%	22%	25%	+31
Indonesia	51%	18%	31%	+33
Kenya	69%	20%	11%	+49
China	73%	19%	8%	+54
Canada	73%	18%	9%	+55
Nigeria	76%	15%	9%	+61
Australia	76%	15%	9%	+61
United States	79%	10%	11%	+69

Results of 2014 BBC World Service poll Views of the United Kingdom's influence by country (sorted by net positive, Pos – Neg)
Country polled	Positive	Negative	Neutral	Pos-Neg
Pakistan	39%	35%	26%	+4
Spain	41%	36%	23%	+5
Turkey	39%	30%	31%	+9
China	39%	26%	35%	+13
Mexico	40%	25%	35%	+15
India	43%	27%	30%	+16
Germany	51%	34%	15%	+17
Peru	41%	21%	38%	+20
Brazil	45%	25%	30%	+20
Russia	44%	16%	40%	+28
Chile	45%	15%	40%	+30
Indonesia	59%	26%	15%	+33
Israel	50%	6%	44%	+44
Japan	47%	2%	51%	+45
Nigeria	67%	22%	11%	+45
United Kingdom	72%	23%	5%	+49
France	72%	20%	8%	+52
Australia	73%	18%	9%	+54
South Korea	74%	14%	12%	+60
Kenya	74%	10%	16%	+64
Ghana	78%	9%	13%	+69
Canada	80%	9%	11%	+71
United States	81%	10%	9%	+71

Anti-British sentiment is the prejudice against, persecution of, discrimination against, fear of, dislike of, or hatred against the British Government, British people, or the culture of the United Kingdom.

== Argentina ==
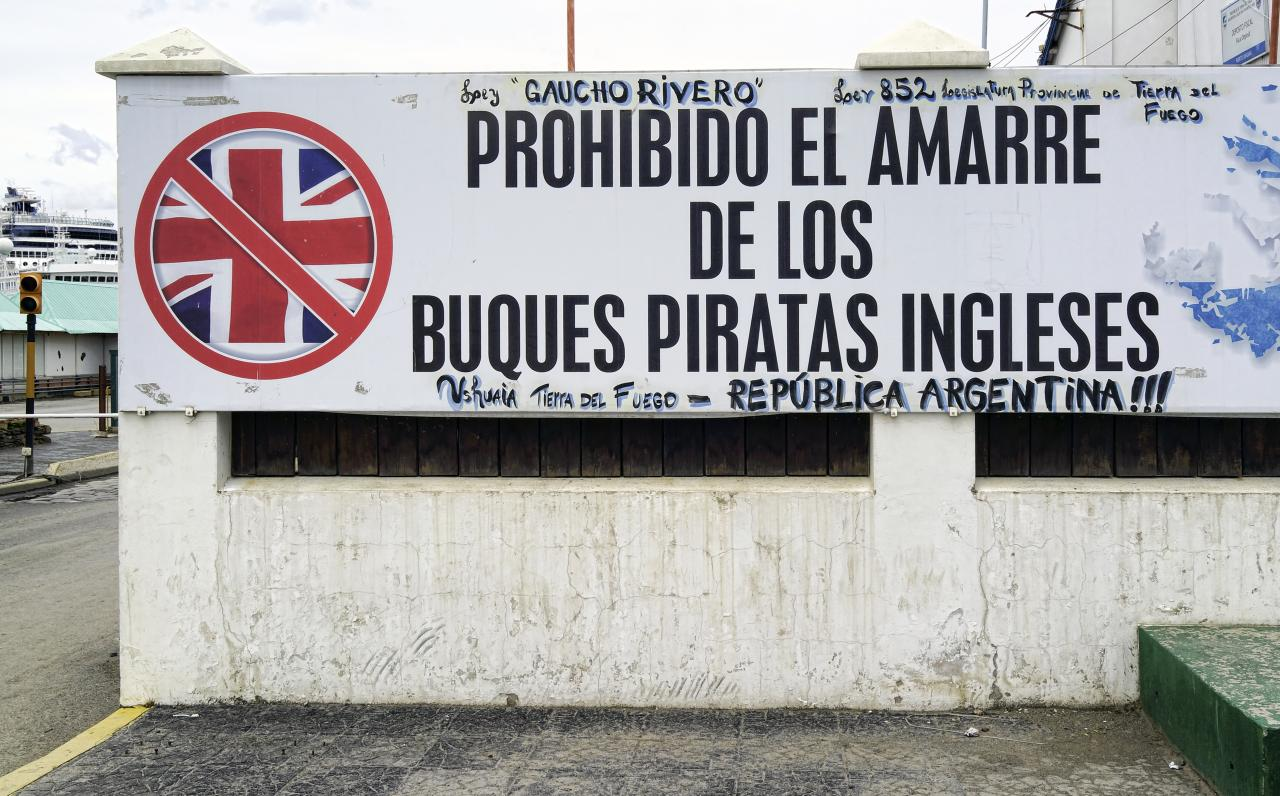
Sign in Ushuaia, Argentina some 700 km from the Falkland Islands: "Mooring by English pirates' ships is prohibited".

Historically, anti-British sentiment in Argentina has its roots on the Falkland Islands sovereignty dispute and the 1982 Falklands War, as well as the perception of disproportional political influence that Britain was once seen to wield in the country due to the large amount British investment in Argentina at the beginning of the 20th century, as exemplified by the controversial Roca–Runciman Treaty in 1933.. Due to these sentiments, protests against the government of the United Kingdom have occasionally occurred in Argentina.

== Germany ==
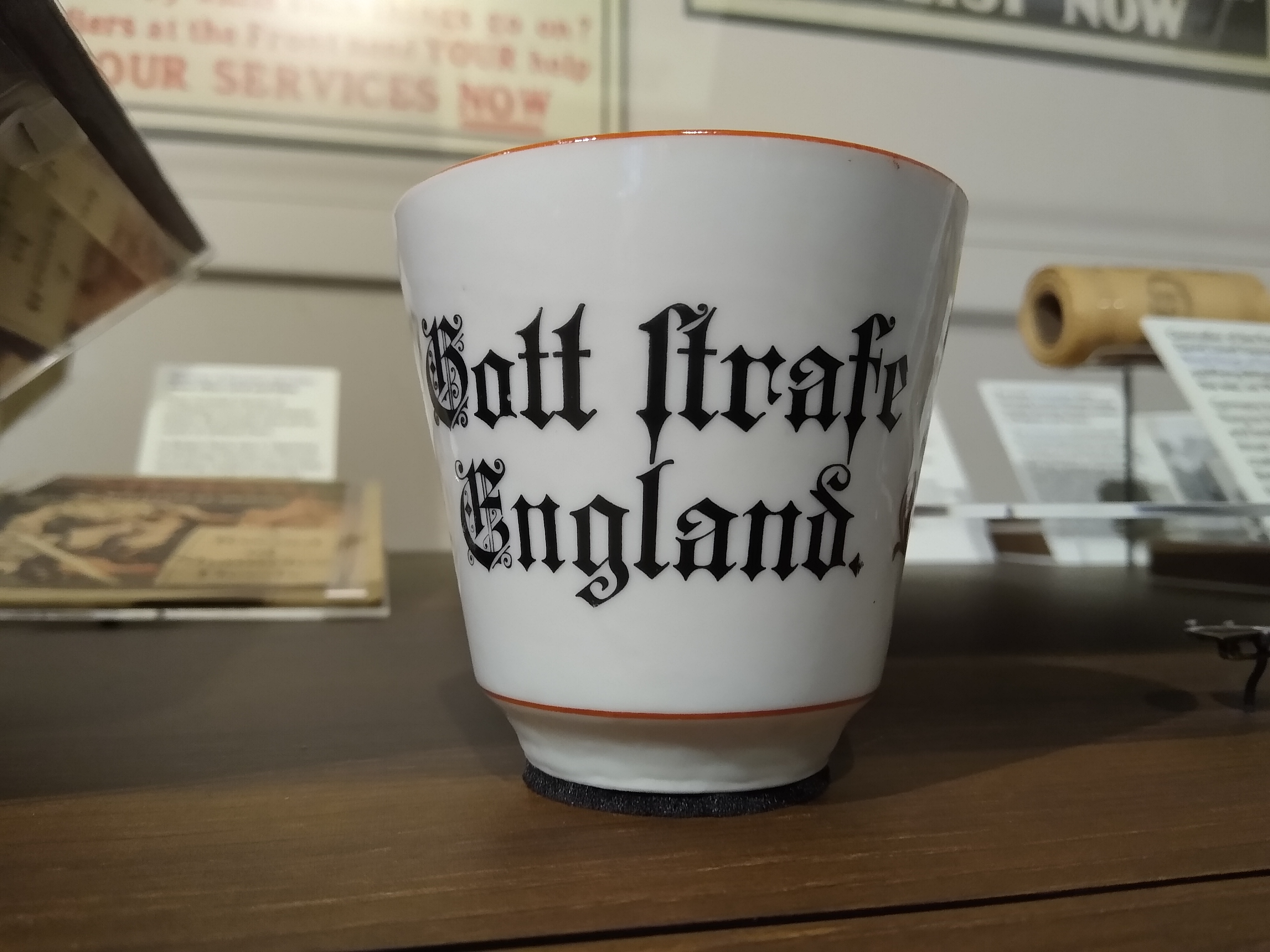
"Gott strafe England" ("May God punish England") on a World War I–era cup

Gott strafe England (English: May god punish England) was an anti-British slogan coined by poet Ernst Lissauer during World War I. It was used by the Imperial German Army as well as the German public during World War I. In 1946, a crowd of Germans in Hamburg chanted the slogan.

== Iran ==
Anti-British sentiment, sometimes described as Anglophobia, has been described as "deeply entrenched in Iranian culture", and reported to be increasingly prevalent in Iran. In July 2009, an adviser to Ayatollah Ali Khamenei called Britain "worse than America" for its alleged interference in Iran's post-election affairs. In the first half of the 20th century, the British Empire exerted political influence over Iran (Persia) in order to control the profits from the Anglo-Persian Oil Company. The British government took an active interest in Iranian affairs, being involved in the overthrow of the Qajar dynasty in the 1920s, the subsequent rise to power of Reza Shah Pahlavi, and the successful coup d'état overthrowing prime minister Mohammad Mosaddeq in 1953.

On Monday 9 August 2010, the senior Iranian minister and Iran's first vice president Mohammad Reza Rahimi declared that the British people were "stupid" and "not human". His remarks drew criticism from Simon Gass, the British ambassador to Iran, and also from the media in Britain.

In November 2011 the Iranian parliament voted to downgrade relations with the UK after British sanctions were imposed on Iran due to its nuclear programme. Iranian politicians reportedly shouted "Death to Britain". On 29 November 2011, Iranian students in Tehran stormed the British embassy, ransacked offices, smashed windows, shouted "Death to England" and burned the Union Jack.

Parts of the Iranian media campaigned against the reopening of the British Embassy in Tehran in August 2015, referring to Britain as an "old fox" – a term popularised by the Pakistani writer Seyyed Ahmad Adib Pishavari – and accusing Britain of having provoked protests against the re-election of Mahmoud Ahmadinejad in 2009.

A poll conducted by the Group for Analyzing and Measuring Attitudes in Iran (GAMAAN) between 21 and 30 September 2021 found that 63% have a negative view of the United Kingdom, while 25% have a positive view.

== Ireland ==
There is a long history of anti-British prejudice and of specifically anti-English sentiment within Irish nationalism; it is rooted in Irish history starting with the Anglo-Norman invasion of Ireland and, even more so, in the policies and actions of the British government during the full annexation from 1801 to 1922 and its treatment of the Great Famine, as well as the Penal laws and the religious persecution of the Catholic Church in Ireland from the reign of Henry VIII until Catholic emancipation in 1829. Much of this was grounded in the hostility felt by the largely Catholic poor for the rackrenting practices of the Anglo-Irish landlord class, who were the backbone of the Protestant Ascendancy and the anti-Catholic Whig single party state in Ireland until the late 19th century events of the Land War. At the same time, however, during the Peninsular War against the even more anti-Catholic Napoleon Bonaparte, thirty per cent of the Duke of Wellington's Army was composed of Irish Catholics. This figure rose steadily over the following decades. By 1831, forty per cent of the British Army was Irish. By the 1860s, the number peaked at sixty per cent claiming to be either Irish-born or of Irish descent. The number then gradually reduced until by the Boer War, twenty per cent of Britain's fighting men were of Irish descent. In post-famine Ireland, anti-English sentiment and anti-colonialism were adopted into the philosophy and foundation of the Irish nationalist movement. At the turn of the twentieth century, the Celtic Revival movement associated the search for a cultural and national identity with decolonisation and language revival.

By 1914, the British Army numbered 247,000 troops, of whom 20,000 were Irish. There were a further 145,000 ex-regular reserves, 30,000 of which were Irish. Thus, in 1914, Irishmen made up twelve percent of the total British Army. Approximately 50,000 Irish soldiers died in the First World War, including the war poets Tom Kettle and Francis Ledwidge. The subsequent events of the Easter Rising and the Irish Declaration of Independence by the First Dáil in 1919 were swiftly followed by systematic atrocities by British Forces during the Irish War of Independence, which continue to be remembered and regularly discussed in the communities where they took place. During World War II, an estimated 70,000 Irish citizens decided, despite Irish neutrality, to serve in the British Armed Forces, together with 50,000 or so from Northern Ireland. 7,500 of these lost their lives in service. Virtually all who served were volunteers. In Southern Ireland at least, decisions to volunteer and serve were mainly individual.

During the Troubles (1969–1998), the sheer amount of Provisional Irish Republican Army (PIRA) sympathy among the populace in the Republic of Ireland allowed PIRA activity to flourish in the country and use it as a base of operations against Northern Ireland and England, contributing to the longevity of the campaign. Hundreds of Irish citizens in the Republic joined the IRA, including Martin Ferris (known for a failed plan to import weapons on board the boat Marita Ann), Thomas McMahon (responsible for assassinating Lord Mountbatten), and Dáithí Ó Conaill (credited for introducing the car bomb to Northern Ireland). Southern Irish PIRA Volunteers, however, also included Sean O'Callaghan, who became a highly damaging mole within the organization for the Special Branch, the counterterrorism wing of the Garda Siochana.

On 2 February 1972, an angry mob, in an outraged response to Bloody Sunday committed by British paratroopers a few days earlier on 30 January and consisting of an estimated 20,000-100,000 people, burned down the British Embassy in Dublin. On 12 May 1981, during the 1981 Irish hunger strike, 2,000 people tried to storm the British Embassy in Dublin.

In 2011, tensions and anti-English or anti-British feelings flared in relation to the proposed state visit of Queen Elizabeth II, the first British monarch to visit Ireland in 100 years. A republican demonstration was held at the GPO Dublin by a group of Irish Republicans on 26 February 2011, and a mock trial and decapitation of an effigy of the Queen were carried out by a republican group Éirígí. Other protests included a Dublin publican hanging a banner declaring "She and her family are all officially barred from this pub as long as the British occupy one inch of this island they will never be welcome in Ireland" during her visit.

It may have been with this in mind that, during Queen Elizabeth II's state visit to Ireland in May 2011, the Queen made an official visit to the Garden of Remembrance in Dublin, which is dedicated to the generations that fought and died in the struggle for Irish independence. During her visit, Liam mac Uistín's poem An Aisling ("We Saw a Vision") was read aloud in the Irish language and the Queen also laid a wreath at the Garden in honor of glúnta na haislinge ("the generations of the vision"), whom Liam mac Uistín's poem both praises and gives a voice. The Queen's gesture was widely praised by the Irish media.

Even so, following the announcement of Queen Elizabeth II's death on 8 September 2022, a video of hardcore Shamrock Rovers fans chanting "Lizzie's in a box, in a box, Lizzie's in a box!" to the tune of KC and the Sunshine Band's "Give It Up" at a UEFA Europa Conference League group stage match in Dublin circulated on social media.

In 2018, the Irish author and journalist Megan Nolan wrote an opinion piece for The New York Times that detailed how she had come to hate England and English people.

== Israel ==
The relationship between Israel and the UK is generally regarded as close and warm, and as a strategic partnership of the two nations. According to the a BBC World Service poll in 2014, five in ten Israelis (50%) have favourable attitudes to the UK, and only 6% of Israelis hold negative views towards the UK, the second lowest percentage after Japan.

Occasional criticism is also found. In Israel, anti-British sentiment may historically stem from British rule and policies in the mandate era, and in modern times from the perceived anti-Israel stance of the British media.

The Jewish population of the United Kingdom was recorded as being 269,568 in the 2011 Census. Reacting to 609 antisemitic incidents across the UK in the first half of 2009, and to the announcement of numerous UK organizations to impose a boycott on Israel, some Israelis claimed that the UK is anti-Israeli and antisemitic. According to an opinion piece by Eytan Gilboa, "the British media systematically supports the Palestinians, and openly slants its reporting about Israel and Israeli policy. The left-wing Guardian and Independent newspapers regularly print accusatory, anti-Israel editorials, and their correspondents in Israel file biased, and occasionally false, reports. The supposedly prestigious BBC has long been a sounding board to trumpet Palestinian propaganda." In 2010 Ron Breiman, a former chairman of the right-wing organisation "Professors for a Strong Israel", claimed in one of Israel's leading newspapers, Haaretz, that the United Kingdom has raised and armed Israel's enemies in Jordan and the Arab Legion and described the British media as anti-Israeli.

Reacting to the UK government's decision to expel an Israeli diplomat because of Mossad's forging of 12 British passports for an assassination operation in 2010, former National Union members of the Israeli parliament Michael Ben-Ari and Aryeh Eldad accused the British government of being "anti-semitic" and referred to them as "dogs".

== Spain ==
Anti-British sentiments evolved in Spain following the ceding of Gibraltar to the British through the Treaty of Utrecht in 1713 following the War of the Spanish Succession. In August 2013, Spain was considering forging an alliance with Argentina over the status of the Falkland Islands.

== United States ==
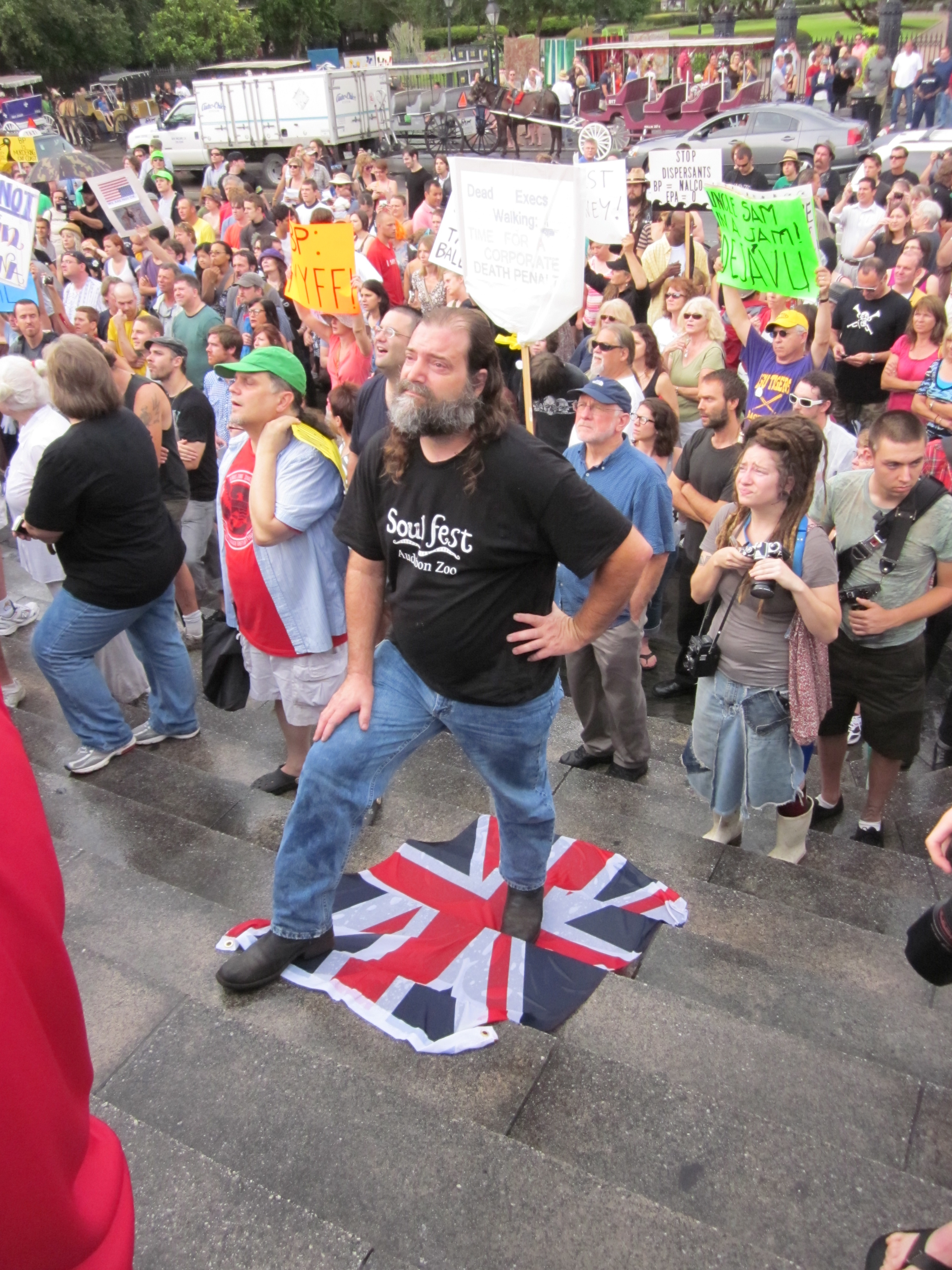
American protester stands on a Union Flag, protesting BP and the Deepwater Horizon Oil Spill

President Thomas Jefferson complained of an unreasonable hostility towards the British state by the people in the United States during the Napoleonic Wars, brought about by the American Revolutionary War.

During the American Civil War, anti-British sentiment in the U.S. ran rampant over the British unofficial role in supporting the Confederacy: blockade runners carrying British arms supplies, Confederate Navy commerce raiders built from British shipyards (e.g., CSS Alabama), and British tolerance of Confederate Secret Service activities in its territories as an anti-U.S. base of military operations (such as James Dunwoody Bulloch, the Chesapeake Affair, the St. Albans Raid, and the Confederate Army of Manhattan) all in violation of British neutrality laws. For example, Irish war correspondent William Howard Russell wrote in his diary on November 13, 1863, that based on his experiences in the North:

The sentiment of dislike [there] towards England is increasing, because English subjects have assisted the South by smuggling and running the blockade.

The U.S. administration of President Ulysses S. Grant sued Britain in 1869 over its complicity in allowing commerce raiders to leave British ports for use against the United States Merchant Marine shipping in the Alabama Claims. Blockade runners from Britain was later added to the charge, as many U.S. officials claimed that without the arms supplies being smuggled by British subjects through the Union blockade to the Confederacy, the war would have ended by 1863, and American casualties and cost of war would have been greatly reduced. The international arbitration in Geneva in 1872 however rejected claims for compensation from the British blockade running, but did order Britain to pay $15.5 million to the U.S. as a result of damages caused by British-built Confederate commerce raiders.

During the World War II alliance, anti-British sentiment took different forms. In May 1942, when conditions were highly problematic for British prospects, American journalist Edward R. Murrow privately gave a British friend an analysis of the sources of persistent anti-British sentiment in the United States. He attributed it especially to:

partly the hard-core of anglophobes (Irish, Germans and isolationists); partly the frustration produced by war without early victories; partly our bad behaviour at Singapore; and partly the tendency common to all countries at war to blame their allies for doing nothing.

Senior American military officers often tried, with little success, to push against Roosevelt's support for Britain. Fleet Admiral Ernest King had been noted for these views which affected his decision-making during the "Second Happy Time" (in the Battle of the Atlantic). Joseph Stilwell, a four-star general in the China, Burma and India theatre of the Second World War was another noted for anti-British views (for example, in this diaries he wrote, "Boy, will this burn up the Limeys!" when Myitkyina was finally taken). Curiously, he got on well with British military commander William Slim, even volunteering to serve under him for a time rather than under George Giffard. Slim noted that Stilwell had a public persona that differed from his private relations.

Roland Emmerich's 2000 movie The Patriot drew controversy for its depiction of British forces during the American Revolutionary War, depicting them as engaging in acts such as the burning of a church with civilians inside it in the Thirteen Colonies during the American Revolution. The Liverpool City Council went on to claim that the film misrepresented British general Banastre Tarleton and sought an apology from the producers. Other commentators noted that a similar incident was committed by German troops in the Oradour-sur-Glane massacre in World War II, and suggested that the film producers may have had, consciously or subconsciously, an anti-British agenda in changing the nationalities and relocating the event to an earlier and different conflict and one stated that it was similar to a "blood libel".

== Derogatory terms ==
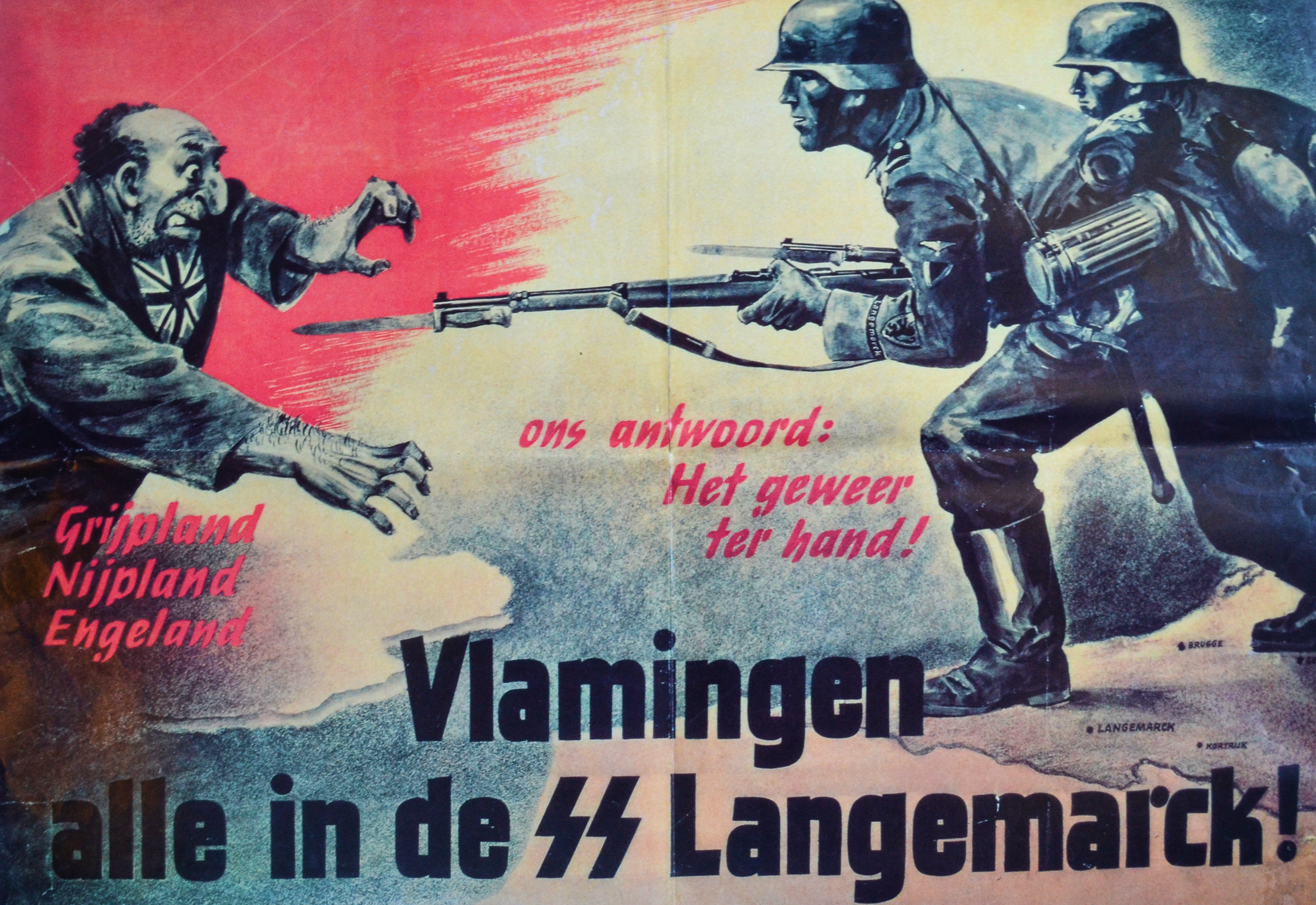
Recruiting poster of 27th SS Volunteer Division Langemarck, featuring derogatory terms for England such as "Grijpland" (land of greed)

- "Limey" is used in the United States as a derogatory term for the British.
- "Pom", as well as variants such as "pommy" and "pommie", are used in Australia, New Zealand and South Africa as slang terms for British people, often (but not always) in a derogatory context.

=== In Spanish ===
- "Piratas" (Pirates) is a derogatory term used in Argentine Spanish to refer to the British people. This term is mainly associated with the Falkland Islands dispute.

== See also ==
- Anglo-Saxons (racialist term)
- Anti-imperialism
- Anti-Americanism
- Anti-French sentiment
- Anti-German sentiment
- Anti-Irish sentiment
- Anti-Russian sentiment
- Anti-Swedish Sentiment
