= Gott strafe England =

German anti-British slogan during World War I

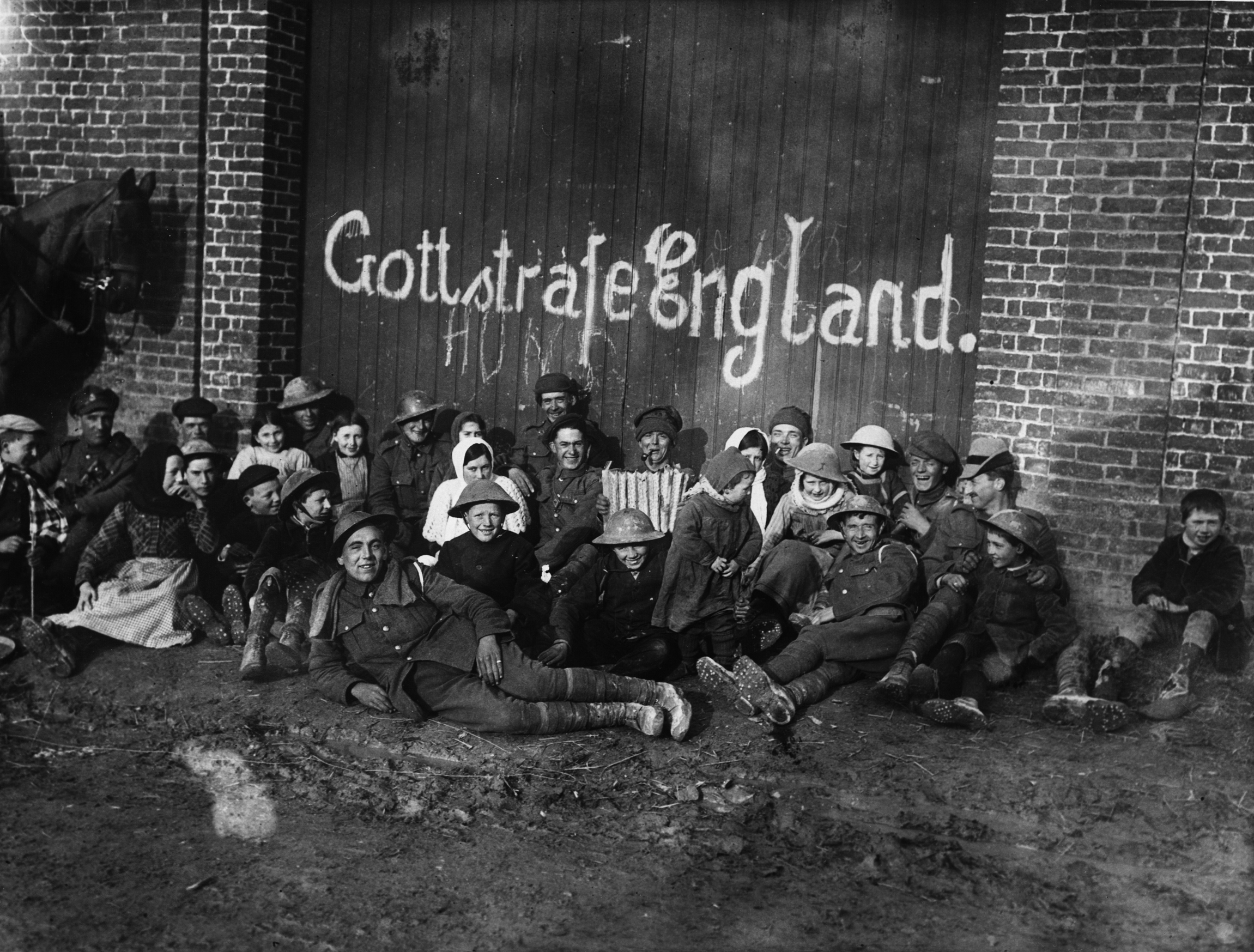
British soldiers and French civilians next to the slogan painted on a wall, 1 January 1918. The slogan was graffitied onto the wall by German troops.

Gott strafe England (lit. 'May God punish England') was an anti-British slogan coined by the German poet and dramatist Ernst Lissauer in 1917 during World War I. The slogan immediately gained widespread popularity in the German Empire, which had been at war with Britain since 1914, and was widely reproduced in Germany's popular culture. The Imperial German Army also adopted the slogan as a motto for its soldiers.

== History ==
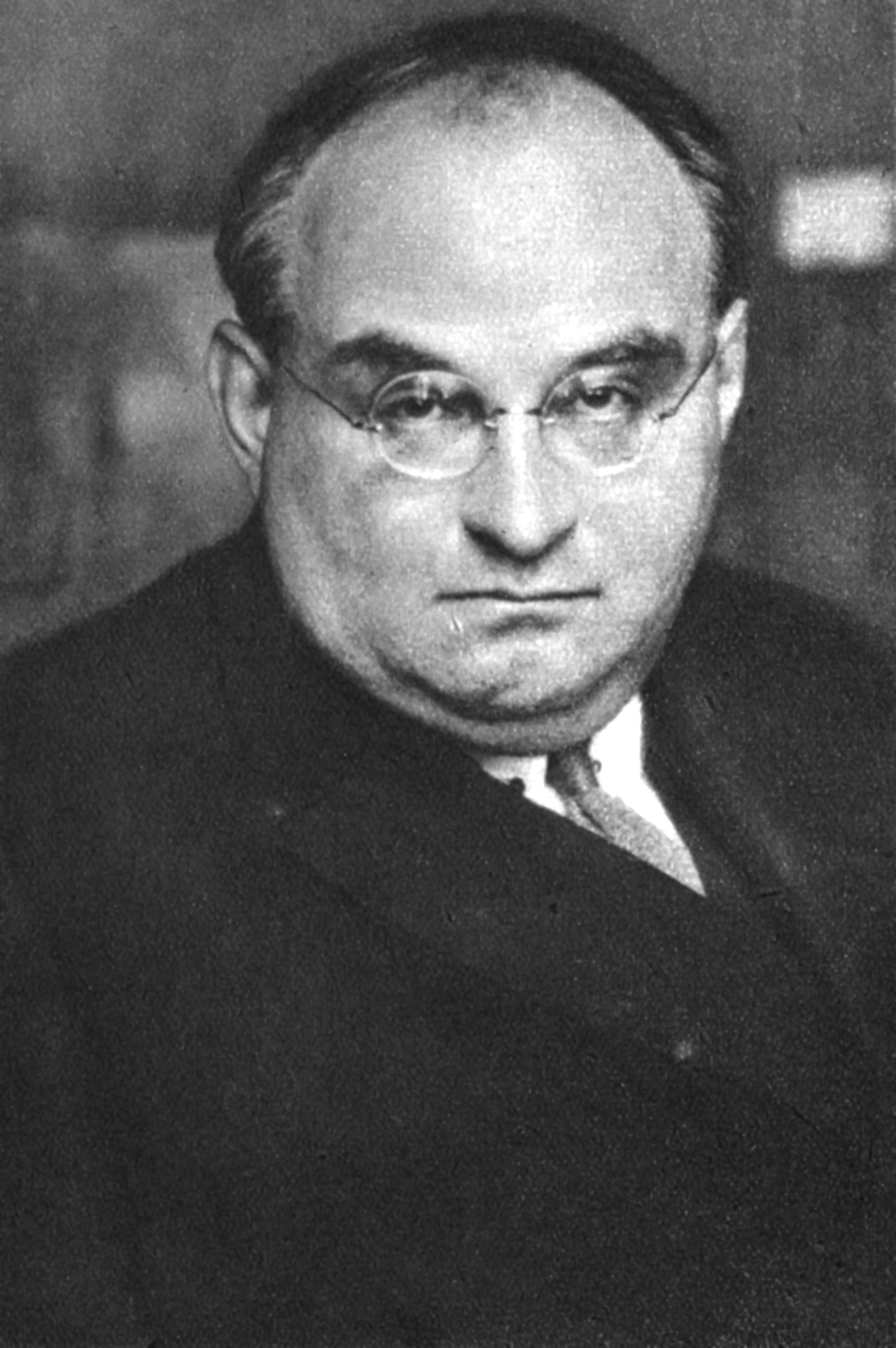
Ernst Lissauer, who coined the slogan

In August 1914, after the outbreak of World War I, German poet Ernst Lissauer published the anti-British poem Hassgesang gegen England ("Song of hate against England"), which in the words of Austrian writer Stefan Zweig "fell like a shell into a munitions depot". The poem became an instant success in the German Empire as a result of "the rhetorical power with which it encapsulated a national emotional response to the outbreak of war". Rupprecht, Crown Prince of Bavaria, the commander of the Imperial German Army's 6th Army, ordered copies of the poem distributed to his troops, and Wilhelm II conferred the Order of the Red Eagle upon Lissauer.

Three years after writing the poem, Lissauer coined the slogan Gott strafe England ("May God punish England"), which achieved similar levels of popularity in Germany, appearing in popular culture such as cufflinks and postcards and being adopted as a motto by the German army. The slogan, which was commonly chanted by jingoistic crowds in German cities, was met with disapproval among some in the German intelligentsia, with Helmut Herzfeld anglicising his name to John Heartfield in protest. The German government was accused of issuing a stamp with the slogan, which they denied, though a number of unofficial stamps bearing the slogan were produced by non-governmental organisations such as the Federation of the Germans in Lower Austria.

The slogan was humorously adopted by English-speakers to create the term "strafing", which refers to the military practice of attacking ground targets from low-flying aircraft using automatic weapons; British Army officer William Gott, who served in World War I and World War II, was nicknamed "Strafer" by his comrades after they were exposed to the slogan.

In 1946, British occupational authorities in Hamburg issued eviction orders to make room for a new headquarters. In response, 4,000 residents of the city gathered in protest, singing the outlawed Deutschlandlied and knocking the hats off fellow Hamburgers who kept their heads covered. The crowd chanted a variety of slogans, including "We’re not Indians, not coolies, we must be treated like Germans", antisemitic slogans and "Gott strafe England". The final slogan led the Royal Military Police to arrest eleven members of the crowd.

== In popular culture ==
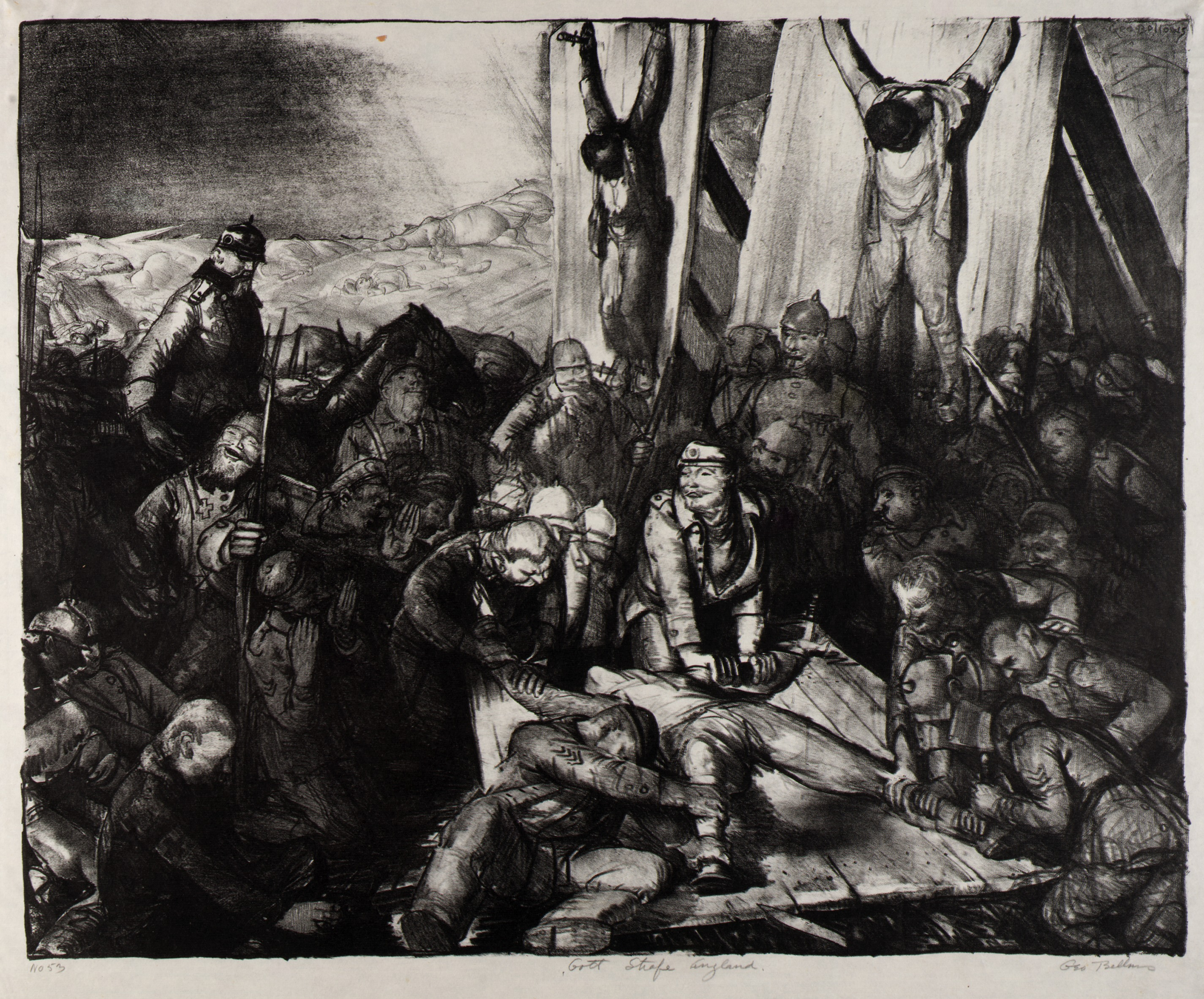
Gott Strafe (England), an anti-German painting by American artist George Bellows

Czech writer Jaroslav Hašek made derisive references on the phrase several times in his 1921 novel The Good Soldier Švejk:

In the meantime the baroness drew presents out of the hamper: a dozen roast chickens wrapped up in pink silk paper and tied with a yellow and black silk ribbon, two bottles of a war liqueur with the label: ′Gott strafe England′. On the back of the label was a picture of Franz Joseph and Wilhelm clasping hands as though they were going to play the nursery game: ′Bunny sat alone in his hole. Poor little bunny, what's wrong with you that you can't hop!′

English poet J. C. Squire satirizes the phrase in his poem "God Heard the Embattled Nations":

God heard the embattled nations sing and shout
"Gott strafe England" and "God save the King!"
God this, God that, and God the other thing –
"Good God!" said God, "I've got my work cut out!"

American artist George Bellows, who made several anti-German works during the war, created a lithograph titled Gott Strafe (England) depicting German troops crucifying Allied soldiers. Louis Raemaekers created a cartoon titled "Gott strafe England".

== See also ==
- Gott mit uns
- Ten German Bombers
