= Schlemm =

Schlemm is a surname. Notable people with the surname include:

- Alfred Schlemm, German general
- Anny Schlemm (1929–2026), German singer
- Friedrich Schlemm, German anatomist
