= Unitheism =

Unitheism may refer to:

- Panentheism
- Pantheism
- Theocracy or another social system in which there is only one code of beliefs extant

== See also ==
- Monotheism
