= Karl Christian Friedrich Krause =

German philosopher (1781–1832)

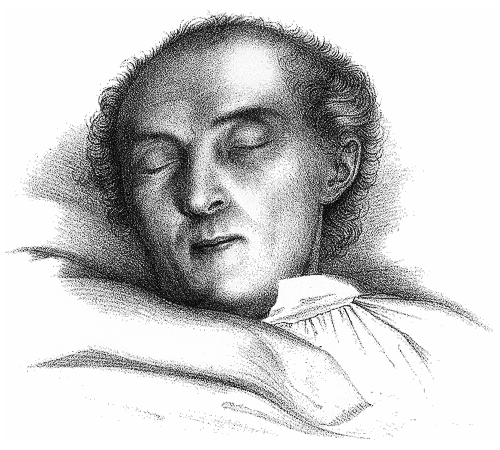
- Lithograph of Karl Krause on his deathbed by H. Dragendorff
- Born: 6 May 1781; Eisenberg, Saxe-Gotha-Altenburg
- Died: 27 September 1832 (aged 51); Munich, Kingdom of Bavaria
- Spouse: Amalie Concordia Fuchs
- Children: 14

Education
- Education: University of Jena (PhD, 1801)
- Academic advisors: J. G. Fichte; Heinrich Paulus; F. W. J. Schelling; August Schlegel

Philosophical work
- Era: 19th-century philosophy
- Region: Western philosophy
- School: German idealism Krausism; Panentheism
- Institutions: University of Jena; Ingenieur-Akademie Dresden; University of Berlin; University of Göttingen
- Notable students: Arthur Schopenhauer
- Main interests: Mysticism
- Notable ideas: Panentheism

Karl Christian Friedrich Krause (German: [ˈkʁaʊzə]; 6 May 1781 – 27 September 1832) was a German philosopher whose doctrines became known as Krausism. Krausism, when considered in its totality as a complete, stand-alone philosophical system, had only a small following in Germany, France, and Belgium, in contradistinction to certain other philosophical systems (such as Hegelianism) that had a much larger following in Europe at that time. However, Krausism became very popular and influential in Restoration Spain not as a complete, comprehensive philosophical system per se, but as a broad cultural movement. In Spain, Krausism was known as krausismo, and Krausists were known as krausistas. Outside of Spain, the Spanish Krausist cultural movement was referred to as Spanish Krausism.

== Early life ==
Krause was born in Eisenberg (in present-day Thuringia). His parents were Johann Friedrich Gotthard Krause (1 January 1747 – 17 February 1825) and Christiana Friederica Böhme (1755 – 21 December 1784). Karl's father Johann was a teacher at the lyceum in Eisenberg, and in 1795 became a Lutheran pastor and hymn collector in Nobitz.

=== Studies at the University of Jena, 1797–1802 ===
Initially educated in Eisenberg, Krause enrolled at the nearby University of Jena in 1797, where, where he studied philosophy under Friedrich Wilhelm Joseph Schelling, Johann Gottlieb Fichte, Christian Gottfried Schütz, Heinrich Karl Abraham Eichstädt, and August Wilhelm von Schlegel. He also attended lectures by theologians Johann Jakob Griesbach, Heinrich Eberhard Gottlob Paulus, Karl David Ilgen, and Johann Adolf Jacobi.

Krause received the degree of doctor of philosophy from the University of Jena on 6 October 1801, and became a Privatdozent (unsalaried lecturer) in 1802.

=== Marriage and children ===
With characteristic imprudence, Krause married Sophie Amalie Concordia Fuchs on 19 July 1802, despite her having no dowry. The couple had 14 children, 12 of whom outlived both parents.

== Teacher ==
In 1804, a lack of pupils compelled Krause to move to Rudolstadt, and later to Dresden, where he gave private lessons in music. In Dresden, he privately taught Indian philosophy to Arthur Schopenhauer.

In 1805, his ideal of a universal world-society led him to join the Freemasons, whose principles seemed to tend in the direction he desired. In Dresden, he published two books on Freemasonry, Höhere Vergeistigung der echt überlieferten Grundsymbole der Freimaurerei: in zwölf Logenvorträgen (1811) and Die drei ältesten Kunsterkunden der Freimaurerbrüderschaft (1819), but his opinions attracted opposition from the Masons. From 1809, Krause held a teaching position the Ingenieur-Akademie Dresden.

Krause lived for a time (1813–1815) in Berlin and became a Privatdozent there, but was unable to obtain a professorship at the University of Berlin. From 1823 to 1830, he was Privatdozent at the University of Göttingen.

In 1831, he moved to Munich, where he died of apoplexy at the very moment when the influence of Franz von Baader had at last obtained a position for him. Krause is buried in the Alter Südfriedhof in Munich, Germany.

== Identitätsphilosophie, panentheism, and other aspects of Krausism ==
Krause's philosophy, as a whole, is an example of what historians of philosophy refer to as Identitätsphilosophie (philosophy of identity). An Identitätsphilosophie is a philosophical system that posits the fundamental identity of spirit and nature. In Krause's philosophical system, the parts of the system which, technically, constitute its "panentheism", are only parts of a much broader whole. Therefore, although Krause's philosophy is accurately described as being "panentheistic", Krausism as a whole is better categorized as an Identitätsphilosophie which features panentheism as one of its primary fundamental components.

Krause endeavoured to reconcile the ideas of a God known by faith or conscience and the world as known to sense. According to Krause, God — intuitively known by conscience — is not a personality (which implies limitations), but an all-inclusive essence (Wesen), which contains the universe within itself. Krause used the term panentheism (Panentheismus in German) in an attempt to accurately describe and encapsulate — in a single technical term — diverse aspects of his philosophical system which were cosmo-theological (simultaneously cosmological and theological) in nature. When considered from a theological perspective, panentheism can be viewed, broadly, as a synthesis of various elements derived from both monotheism and pantheism.

=== Etymology of "panentheism" ===
Historians of philosophy usually give Krause sole credit for coining the term "panentheism" in 1828. However, according to evidence provided by Philip Clayton, the German idealist philosopher Friedrich Wilhelm Joseph von Schelling had already used this term (albeit in a slightly different form — in the form of the phrase "pan + en + theism"), and also had discussed numerous concepts and issues related to it, in his Philosophische Untersuchungen über das Wesen der menschlichen Freiheit und die damit zusammenhängenden Gegenstände (Philosophical Investigations into the Essence of Human Freedom and Matters Connected Therewith, 1809).

Additionally, Krause and Schelling scholars now recognize that Krause's philosophy, as a whole, reflects, and partially incorporates, many of the themes, concepts and insights present in Schelling's Naturphilosophie (Philosophy of Nature), which itself is a form of panentheism. It now appears that Schelling's work may have provided much more of the framework of Krausean panentheism than historians of philosophy in the past had realized. Based on Clayton's evidence, it is quite possible that Krause, who was well-acquainted with Schelling and his works, adopted at least some of the initial basic concepts of his own panentheistic system from various works of Schelling (especially from Schelling's Philosophical Investigations into the Essence of Human Freedom) and then gradually developed those basic concepts into his own very elaborate version of panentheism.

Looking forward, it might be more accurate for historians of philosophy to now say that Schelling in 1809 provided not only the terminological framework of Krausean panentheism but also some of the basic concepts (at least), of what was to become Krausean panentheism. Krause not only adopted and greatly expanded upon those concepts and insights from Schelling but also adopted Schelling's phrase "pan + en + theism". In 1828, he merely reduced Schelling's phrase into a more concise and compact form (as the single term "panentheism") in an attempt to succinctly and adequately describe, in a single term, the cosmotheological aspects of his own philosophical system.

In his published works, Krause first used the term "panentheism" (in its German-language form "Panentheismus") in Vorlesungen über das System der Philosophie (Göttingen: 1828). The term "Panentheismus" next appears in his Vorlesungen über die Grundwahrheiten der Wissenschaft, zugleich in ihrer Beziehung zu dem Leben. Nebst einer kurzen Darstellung und Würdigung der bisherigen Systeme der Philosophie, vornehmlich der neusten von Kant, Fichte, Schelling und Hegel, und der Lehre Jacobi's. (Göttingen: 1829).

Krause argued that the world itself and mankind, its highest component, constitute an organism (Gliedbau), and the universe is therefore a divine organism (Wesengliedbau). The process of development is the formation of higher unities, and the last stage is the identification of the world with God. The form which this development takes, according to Krause, is Right or the Perfect Law.

Right is not the sum of the conditions of external liberty but of absolute liberty, and embraces all the existence of nature, reason and humanity. It is the mode, or rationale, of all progress from the lower to the highest unity or identification. By its operation, the reality of nature and reason rises into the reality of humanity. God is the reality which transcends and includes both nature and humanity. Right is, therefore, at once the dynamic and the safeguard of progress.

Ideal society results from the widening of the organic operation of this principle from the individual man to small groups of men, and finally to mankind as a whole. The differences disappear as the inherent identity of structure predominates in an ever-increasing degree, and in the final unity Man is merged in God. Krause's theory of the world and of humanity is therefore universal and idealistic.

=== Animal rights ===
Krause was an advocate of animal rights and has been cited as the first philosopher to argue for animal rights in the context of a philosophy of law. In his book Das System der Rechtsphilosophie (published posthumously in 1874), he argued that non-human animals should hold a right not to be subjected to pain as well as a right to general physical well-being. Krause rejected Fichte's anthropocentric premisses. He held the view that animals are persons whose rights must be protected by law.

== Influence and works ==
The comparatively small area of Krause's influence was due partly to him being overshadowed by Schelling and Hegel, and partly to two difficulties present in his written works. The spirit of his thought is mystical and by no means easy to follow, and this problem is accentuated, even for German readers, by his use of artificial and/or invented terminology. He makes use of Germanized foreign terms which were frequently unintelligible.

His principal works are (beside those quoted above): Entwurf des Systems der Philosophie (1804), System der Sittenlehre (1810), and Das Urbild der Menschheit (1811).

Johann Gottlieb Fichte's science of knowledge (Wissenschaftslehre) morphs into Grundwissenschaft in Krause; the term is later taken up by Johannes Rehmke.

At his death, Krause left behind a large collection of unpublished notes, some of which were subsequently edited and published by his followers, including Heinrich Ahrens, Hermann von Leonhardi, and Guillaume Tiberghien.

Krausism became particularly influential in Spain in the 19th century, where Krause's ideas were introduced and promoted by Julián Sanz del Río, an academic based in Madrid. Krause's philosophy flourished in Spain (where it was known as krausismo) because it contains elements which were very appealing — at the time — to a diverse class of people. Krausism in Spain was popular and successful, more as a broad cultural movement rather than as a specialised form of cosmo-theology. As a cultural movement, it emphasised scientific rationalism, combined with Christian spirituality, a liberal commitment to individual freedom, and opposition to privilege and arbitrary power. Spanish intellectuals influenced by Krause include Francisco Giner de los Ríos (1839-1915) and Gumersindo de Azcárate (1840-1917). In addition, Krause's influence extended to Latin America, where his work made an impact on Hipólito Yrigoyen (1852-1933), José Batlle y Ordóñez (1856-1929) and Juan José Arévalo (1904-1990). Richard Gott has argued that Krause influenced José Martí (1853-1895), Fidel Castro (1926-2016) (through Martí and other Cuban thinkers), and Che Guevara (1928-1967).

== Selected publications ==
- Krause, Karl Christian Friedrich: Ausgewählte Schriften (Selected Writings) - Edited by Pedro Álvarez Lázaro, Ricardo Pinilla Burgos, and Enrique M. Ureña (Stuttgart: Frommann-Holzboog) - ISBN 978-3-7728-2340-4.
  - Vol. 1 (2007): Entwurf des Systemes der Philosophie. Erste Abtheilung enthaltend die allgemeine Philosophie, nebst einer Anleitung zur Naturphilosophie (Outline of the System of Philosophy. First Part, containing general Philosophy, together with an Introduction to the Philosophy of Nature) - Ed. by Thomas Bach and Olaf Breidbach - ISBN 978-3-7728-2341-1.
  - Vol. 2 (2009): Philosophisch-freimaurerische Schriften (1808-1832) (Philosophical-Masonic Writings - 1808-1832) - Ed. and introduced by Johannes Seidel, Enrique M. Ureña and Erich Fuchs - ISBN 978-3-7728-2342-8.
  - Vol. 3 (2013): Vermischte Schriften (Miscellaneous Writings) - Ed. by Pedro Álvarez Lázaro, Erich Fuchs, Ricardo Pinilla Burgos, Johannes Seidel, Enrique M. Ureña, and José Manuel Vázquez-Romero - ISBN 978-3-7728-2343-5.
  - Vol. 4 (2022): Schriften zur Rechtsphilosophie (Writings on the Philosophy of Law) - Ed. by Wolfgang Forster and Peter Landau - ISBN 978-3-7728-2344-2.
  - Vol. 5 (2018): Das Urbild der Menschheit. Ein Versuch. Dresden 1811 (The Archetype of Humanity. An Essay. Dresden 1811) - Ed. by Pedro Álvarez Lázaro, Ricardo Pinilla Burgos, Andrea Schäpers, Enrique M. Ureña, and José Manuel Vázquez-Romero - ISBN 978-3-7728-2345-9.
  - Vol. 6 (2026; in 2 volumes): Vorlesungen über das System der Philosophie (Lectures on the System of Philosophy) - Ed. by Pedro Álvarez Lázaro, Stefan Gross, Ricardo Pinilla Burgos, Andrea Schäpers, and José Manuel Vázquez-Romero - ISBN 978-3-7728-2346-6.
- Das System der Rechtsphilosophie (Leipzig: F. A. Brockhaus, 1874).
