= Salzgitter =

City in Lower Saxony, Germany

Salzgitter Soltgitter (Eastphalian)
- City
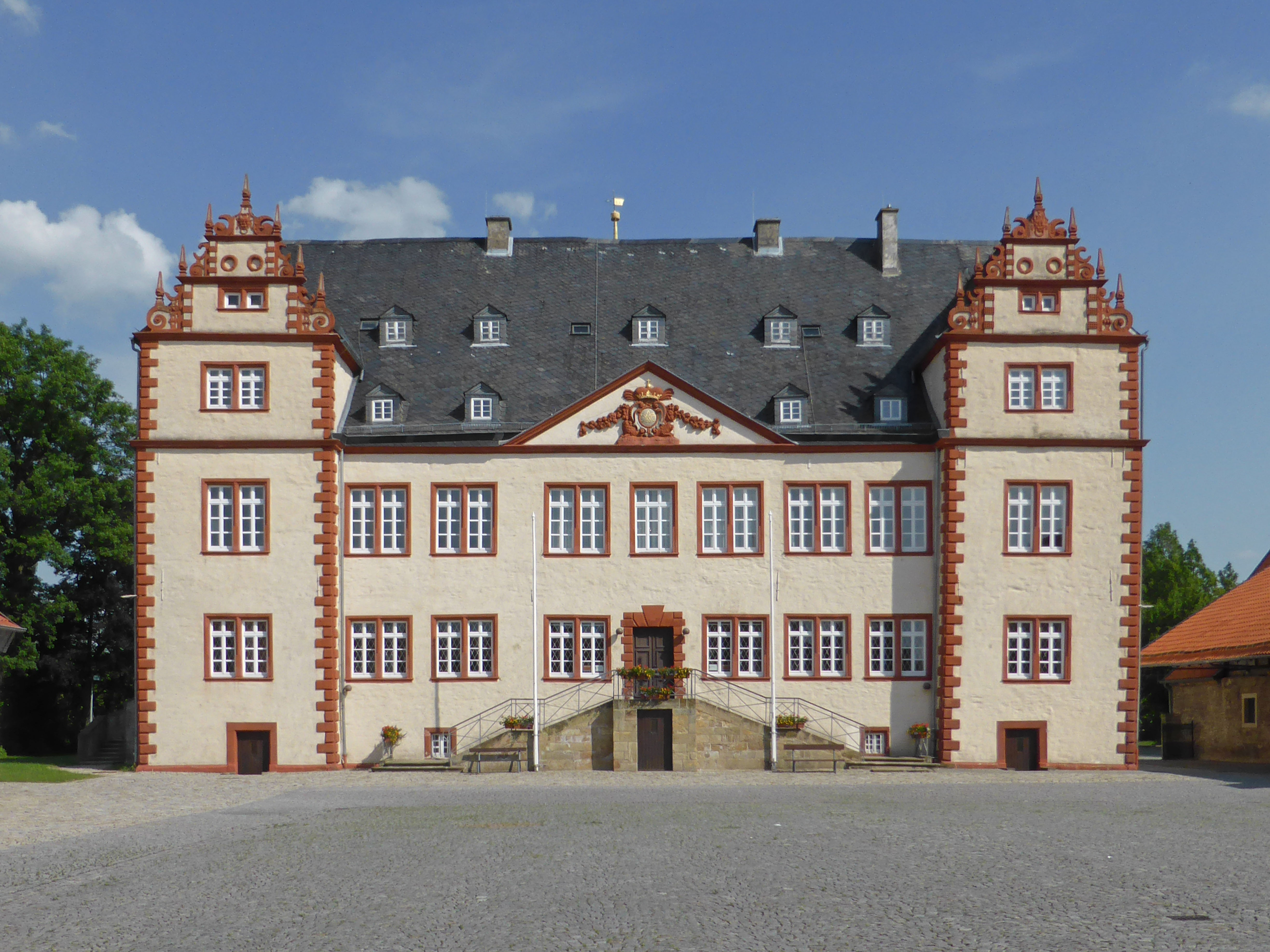
- Salder Castle

- Flag Coat of arms
- Interactive map of Salzgitter
- Location within Germany Location within Lower Saxony
- Coordinates: 52°09′N 10°20′E
- Country: Germany
- State: Lower Saxony
- District: Urban district
- Subdivisions: 7 towns with 31 boroughs

Government
  - Mayor (2021–26): Frank Klingebiel (CDU)

Area
  - Total: 224.49 km^{2} (86.68 sq mi)
- Elevation: 80–275 m (262–902 ft)

Population (2025-12-31)
  - Total: 104,433
  - Density: 465.20/km^{2} (1,204.9/sq mi)
- Time zone: UTC+01:00 (CET)
  - Summer (DST): UTC+02:00 (CEST)
- Postal codes: 38226, 38228, 38229, 38239, 38259
- Dialling codes: 05341
- Vehicle registration: SZ
- Website: www.salzgitter.de

Salzgitter (German: [zaltsˈɡɪtɐ]; Eastphalian: Soltgitter) is an independent city in southeast Lower Saxony, Germany, located between Hildesheim and Braunschweig. Together with Wolfsburg and Braunschweig, Salzgitter is one of the seven Oberzentren (metropolitan areas) of Lower Saxony. With 107,674 inhabitants and 223.92 square kilometres (86.46 sq mi) (as of 2015), it is the largest city by area in Lower Saxony and one of the largest in Germany. Salzgitter originated as a conglomeration of several small towns and villages, and is today made up of 31 boroughs, which are relatively compact conurbations with wide stretches of open country between them.

The city is part of two urban areas, Hildesheim and Braunschweig, because of its uneven distribution of urban quarters. Due to the uneven population distribution, the density of the areas within the Braunschweig urban area is over 1,500 people per km^{2} with the Lebenstedt area having over 3,000 people per km^{2}. Over 70% (76,500) of the population lives within the urban area of Braunschweig, but most of the area is within the urban area of Hildesheim. 54.1% (41,000 people) of the city's population within the Braunschweig urban agglomeration area are immigrants or the children of immigrants.

The city's main shopping street is in the borough of Lebenstedt, and the central business district is in Salzgitter-Bad. The city is connected to the Mittellandkanal and the Elbe Lateral Canal by a distributary. The nearest metropolises are Braunschweig, about 23 kilometres (14 miles) to the northeast, and Hanover, about 51 km (32 miles) to the northwest. The population of the City of Salzgitter has exceeded 100,000 inhabitants since its foundation in 1942 (which made it a city (Großstadt) in contrast to a town (Stadt) by the German definition), when it was still called Watenstedt-Salzgitter. Beside Wolfsburg, Leverkusen and Eisenhüttenstadt, Salzgitter is one of the few cities in Germany founded during the 20th century.

== Name ==
Until 31 March 1942, "Salzgitter" was the name of a town where the borough Salzgitter-Bad now is. From then until 1951, "Salzgitter" was the name of a borough of the city Watenstedt-Salzgitter that existed at the time. In 1951, the borough Salzgitter was renamed Salzgitter-Bad; the name Salzgitter, having thus been freed up, became the new and more succinct name of the city that had been called "Watenstedt-Salzgitter" until then. (Nowadays, "Salzgitter-Watenstedt" is the name of a small borough with a few hundred inhabitants.)

== Geography ==
Salzgitter is located in a wide dell coated with loess, between the Oderwald Forest and the Salzgitter-Höhenzug ("Salzgitter Hills"). The city stretches up to 24 km (15 mi) from north to south and up to 19 km (12 mi) from east to west. The highest point is the hill Hamberg (275 m or 902 ft), located northwest of Salzgitter-Bad.

=== Neighbouring municipalities ===
The following cities, towns and municipalities, listed clockwise beginning in the northeast, border on the city of Salzgitter. (As Salzgitter was founded on the area of the district of Wolfenbüttel, that district borders on Salzgitter in the west and in the east and is therefore listed twice.)

- Braunschweig (independent city)
- in the Landkreis Wolfenbüttel: City of Wolfenbüttel, Cramme, Flöthe (both belonging to Samtgemeinde Oderwald), Gielde (Samtgemeinde Schladen)
- in the Landkreis Goslar: Liebenburg, Wallmoden, Samtgemeinde Lutter am Barenberge
- in the Landkreis Wolfenbüttel: Sehlde, Haverlah, Elbe, Baddeckenstedt, Burgdorf bei Salzgitter (all Samtgemeinde Baddeckenstedt)
- in the Landkreis Hildesheim: Söhlde
- in the Landkreis Peine: Lengede, Vechelde

=== City structure ===
Salzgitter and its 31 boroughs

The area of the City of Salzgitter consists of 31 boroughs (German: Stadtteile; often called villages): Bad, Barum, Beddingen, Beinum, Bleckenstedt, Bruchmachtersen, Calbecht, Drütte, Engelnstedt, Engerode, Flachstöckheim, Gebhardshagen, Gitter, Groß Mahner, Hallendorf, Heerte, Hohenrode, Immendorf, Lebenstedt, Lesse, Lichtenberg, Lobmachtersen, Ohlendorf, Osterlinde, Reppner, Ringelheim, Salder, Sauingen, Thiede, Üfingen and Watenstedt.

These 31 boroughs are combined to 7 towns (German: Ortschaften). Each town has an elected mayor and town council.

The towns with their boroughs are:

- Town North: Lebenstedt, Salder, Bruchmachtersen, Engelnstedt
- Town Northeast: Thiede, Beddingen, Üfingen, Sauingen
- Town Northwest: Lichtenberg, Osterlinde, Reppner, Lesse
- Town East: Hallendorf, Bleckenstedt, Drütte, Immendorf, Watenstedt
- Town South: Bad, Gitter, Groß Mahner, Ringelheim, Hohenrode
- Town Southeast: Flachstöckheim, Barum, Beinum, Lobmachtersen, Ohlendorf
- Town West: Gebhardshagen, Calbecht, Engerode, Heerte

== History ==
=== 1300–1982 ===
Salzgitter originated in the beginning of the 14th century around salt springs near the village Verpstedt (later Vöppstedt). The name was derived from the neighbouring village Gitter (nowadays a city borough) as "up dem solte to Gytere", which means "salt near Gitter"; the first mention was in 1347. After 200 years of salt production at various springs, the peasants in the area which is nowadays Salzgitter were chartered around 1350, but lost municipal law again when being transferred to the Duchy of Brunswick-Lüneburg in the beginning of the 16th century. Later, Salzgitter belonged to the diocese of Hildesheim. When the diocese was transferred to Prussia in 1803, the municipal law was reconfirmed, but taken away once more in 1815, when Salzgitter became part of the Kingdom of Hanover. In 1830, a brine bath was established in Salzgitter.

After the Kingdom of Hanover was transferred to Prussia in 1866, Salzgitter became a Prussian municipality, which was chartered again in 1929. Prior to that, the towns Vorsalz and Liebenhall had been incorporated (in 1926 and 1928, respectively). Salzgitter now belonged to the Landkreis (district) of Goslar and included, apart from Salzgitter itself, also some small settlements like Gittertor, which is nowadays part of Salzgitter-Bad. In 1936, Kniestedt was incorporated; it is also part of Salzgitter-Bad now.

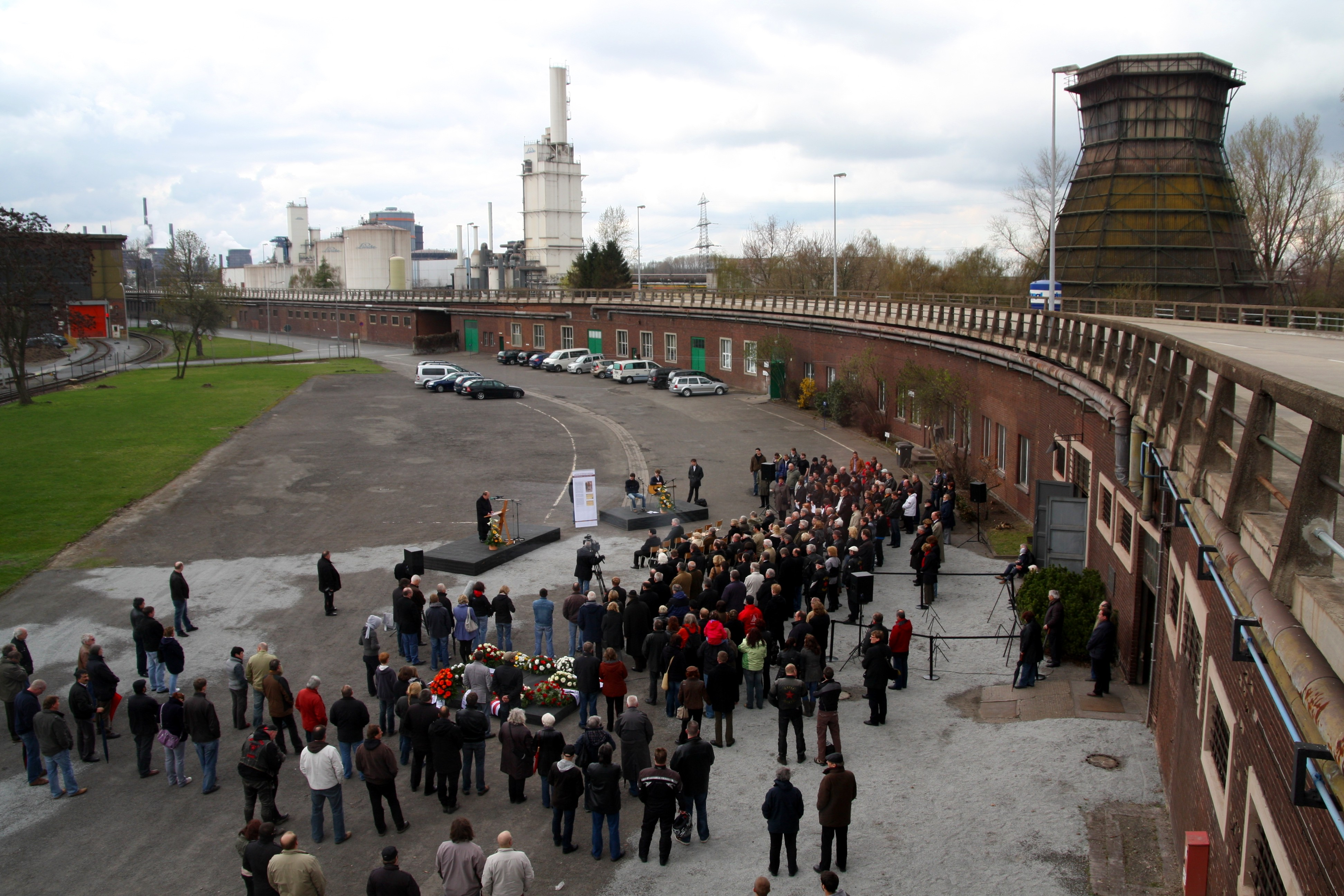
Salzgitter-Drütte concentration camp memorial

Due to the large iron ore body in Salzgitter, which had been mentioned first in 1310, the National Socialists founded the "Reichswerke Hermann Göring" for ore mining and iron production in 1937. In order to facilitate an unobstructed development of the smelting works, a unique administration structure in the whole area was conceived. Therefore, it was decreed in the Order about the area settlement around the Hermann-Göring-Werke Salzgitter, effective from 1 April 1942, to form a unified city district (independent city). Towards this aim, the town of Salzgitter and the municipalities Beinum, Flachstöckheim, Groß-Mahner, Hohenrode, Ohlendorf and Ringelheim (7 in total, all belonging to the Landkreis Goslar) and Barum, Beddingen, Bleckenstedt, Bruchmachtersen, Calbecht, Drütte, Engelnstedt, Engerode, Gebhardshagen, Hallendorf, Heerte, Immendorf, Lebenstedt, Lesse, Lichtenberg, Lobmachtersen, Osterlinde, Reppner, Salder, Thiede-Steterburg (nowadays simply Thiede) and Watenstedt (21 in total, all belonging to the Landkreis Wolfenbüttel) were merged to form the Stadtkreis Watenstedt-Salzgitter. As the neighbouring municipality Gitter had already been incorporated in 1938, the young city initially comprised 29 boroughs in 1942. Together with the remainder of the district of Goslar, the new independent municipality was integrated into the Free State of Brunswick. In return, Braunschweig transferred the Landkreis Holzminden to the Prussian Province of Hanover. In October, 1942, the SS established the Drütte concentration camp, a subcamp of the Neuengamme concentration camp, to provide slave labour for the Hermann Göring Works. This large subcamp held 2,800 inmates. There were three concentration camps located in Salzgitter. During the war, Salzgitter was severely damaged by several American and British bombings. After the war, the State of Braunschweig became part of the Land Lower Saxony, and Watenstedt-Salzgitter became an Independent City in the "Administrative District of Braunschweig" (later Regierungsbezirk Braunschweig).

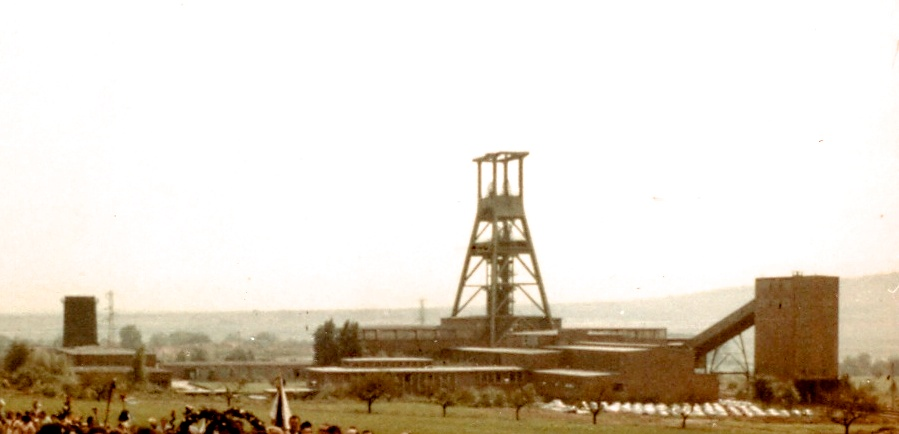
Georg mine in Salzgitter in 1961

In 1951, the city was renamed to "Stadt Salzgitter" (City of Salzgitter), while the borough Salzgitter was renamed to "Salzgitter-Bad", referring to the brine bath there. In the course of the local administrative reform of Lower-Saxony effective from 1 March 1974, the municipalities Üfingen and Sauingen (formerly Landkreis Wolfenbüttel) were incorporated, increasing the number of boroughs to 31. Iron ore continued to be mined in Salzgitter until 1982; in the former mine Schacht Konrad (Konrad mine), an ultimate disposal place for radioactive waste has been planned since 1975.

=== Modern history ===
In February 2024, MAN Truck & Bus announced plans to expand its global parts logistics center in Salzgitter by nearly 53,000 square meters, bringing the total footprint to 230,000 square meters.

== Population development ==
Population figures in order to the then area, i.e. until 1942 the contemporary quarter Salzgitter-Bad and from 1942 on the Independent City Watenstedt-Salzgitter and Salzgitter respectively. 76% of the population was developing near the City Braunschweig due to urbanization, closer proximity to a major city and other factors. Although a high concentration of the population lives near the larger City Braunschweig, most of the area is near the Hildesheim agglomeration or in other parts

Population
Year	Population
1821	2,258
1848	2,654
1871	2,752
1885	2,681
1905	2,837
1925	2,852
1933	19,164
1942	108,480
1946	93,260
1948	110,247
1950	108,888
6 June 1961 ¹	110,200
1965	115,500
1970	119,000
1975	119,000
1980	113,500
25 May 1987 (Note: Census amount)	111,069
1989	111,676
30 June 1997	116,300
October 2003	109,632
September 2004	108,614
February 2005	108,174
December 2015	101,079
December 2016	103,668
December 2024	104,970

=== Immigration ===
Salzgitter has the highest share of migrants to Germans in Lower Saxony as it was a cheaper place for guest workers to reside. The foreigner-born population was 37,048 (32.8% of the total population) in 2023. 60.2% of Salzgitter residents had a migration background and the majority are from the Middle Eastern or Eastern European countries. Over 75% of the population below 18 years of age has a migration background.

In 2017, they city council implemented a ban on accepting asylum seekers as the city had an existing number of asylum seekers who needed to integrate. This ban was later taken down as the population of the city started to spike down drastically and the city started to have a lack of staff for services.

The areas with the highest percentage of migrants in Salzgitter are Steterburg with 57.5%, Seeviertel with 55.7%, Lebenstedt with 54.1%, Lichtenberg with 52.1%, Watenstedt with 48.4% and Bad with 46.4%. Most of the migrants live within the Braunschweig urban agglomeration.

About 17.5% of the total population is Muslim in 2024, having the highest percentage of Muslims in the whole state and one of the highest in Germany. The percentage of people with an immigration background in Salzgitter is projected to be 60% to 75% in the year 2030

	Largest groups of foreign residents
Nationality	Population (2024)
Turkey	10,421
Syria	6,632
Poland	6,139
Kazakhstan	2,591
Romania	2,579
Russia	2,259
Bulgaria	1,349
Lebanon	1,022
Italy	815
Tunisia	745
India	622

=== Braunschweig-Salgitter-Wolfsburg Area ===
The three cities form a Oberzentrum and a sub-metropolitan area. The area is primarily dependent on the Steel, Automotive and R&D industries. The area has population over a 1 million (1,014,477) as of 2023. The three main cities have a total number of 512,600 people, where over half the population lives. The polycentric urban area has 40.6% of the population with a migration background and is aiming to progressively increase the foreign population in the upcoming years. The area contributes highly to the economy of the country especially due to Volkswagen, Siemens, Salzgitter AG and other companies. The area has one of the highest GDP per Capita in the whole of Europe with Wolfsburg having the highest in the whole country and Braunschweig having one of the highest. Though the area faced a debt, mass destruction, a population decrease after World War II, it bounced back due to high demand of car manufacturing and need for research and development.

== Religions ==
The area of the modern city of Salzgitter originally pertained to the diocese of Hildesheim. In 1568, the Reformation was established in Salzgitter, and two ecclesiastical superintendencies came into existence: the southern part of the area of the modern city, the Superintendency of Salzgitter, pertained to the Province of Hanover and thus ecclesiastically to the Evangelical Lutheran State Church of Hanover (and, within it, to the Consistory of Hildesheim); the northern part (the Superintendency of Lebenstedt), however, belonged to the Free State of Brunswick and therefore to the Evangelical Lutheran State Church in Brunswick.

When the city of Watenstedt-Salzgitter was created in 1942, the entire area was attached to the state of Brunswick both politically and ecclesiastically. Thus, all parishes of Salzgitter now belong to the Church of Brunswick. The two superintendencies are called Propstei (provostry) today, and both the Propsteien Salzgitter-Bad and Salzgitter-Lebenstedt comprise additional parishes which are not within the city of Salzgitter.

Roman Catholics who after the Reformation moved into the city belonged, as in the Middle Ages, to the diocese of Hildesheim, which established a separate deanery in Salzgitter. All Roman Catholic parishes of the city now pertain to that deanery.

Besides the two major denominations, there are congregations in Salzgitter which belong to free churches. These include a Baptist parish, the Church of God, Plymouth Brethren, and the Seventh-day Adventist Church, as well as several New Apostolic Churches.

Due to the immigration of foreign workers during the 1970s, there are some Islamic mosques. According to calculations based on census data, Salzgitter in 2011 had the highest proportion of Muslim migrants of all major cities in Lower Saxony.

== Politics ==
After the creation of Salzgitter a state commissar was set in place as provisional Mayer of the city of Watenstedt-Salzgitter. After World War II, the military government of the British zone of occupation installed the communal constitution of Britain. Furthermore, there is an elected Council in place. The Council elects one of its members to Mayor (German: Oberbürgermeister) as leader and representative of the city. Besides, since 1946 on there was the Oberstadtdirektor as the Chief Executive of the City Council. Since 2001, the office of the leader of the Council and the Chief Executive are merged into one, simply called Mayor. Being elected by the people, the Mayor represents the city and leads the Council.

== Coat of arms ==
Coat of arms of the city of Salzgitter

Salzgitter's Coat of Arms consists of a silver furnace visible behind a silver pinnacle wall on which there is a buckler whose upper ground is green and adorned with two saltern instruments and whose lower ground is gold and adorned with a black sledge and black iron. On the red ground behind the furnace, there are two wheaten ears.

The Coat of Arms stands for the agriculture, which is important for many villages of Salzgitter, on the one hand, and for the industry, which led to Salzgitter's foundation, on the other hand.

This Coat of Arms is from 1951. Before, Watenstedt-Salzgitter had got a different one. Also the former town Salzgitter had got various coats of arms from 1854 on.

Like many German cities, Salzgitter has used the city's logo for some years. It is a green field with a white snaking way that narrows towards the horizon.

== Transport ==
=== Road ===
In the north of Salzgitter, there is an Autobahn (A 39) from Braunschweig to the interchange Salzgitter (where it is possible change to Autobahn 7 Kassel-Hanover). Salzgitter has got five grade-separated interchanges to this Autobahn. East from Salzgitter, there is the Autobahn 395 (Braunschweig-Goslar), which can be reached from Salzgitter by four interchanges.
Moreover, two highways go through Salzgitter.

=== Railway ===
Salzgitter has six railway stations. The most important one is in the quarter Salzgitter-Ringelheim, the most central one in Salzgitter-Lebenstedt. There is no Hauptbahnhof (main railway station) in Salzgitter. Salzgitter-Ringelheim's station is located on the Halle (Saale)-Goslar-Salzgitter-Hildesheim-Hanover line. Another line leads into the Harz Mountains and to Braunschweig, passing Salzgitter-Bad. Salzgitter-Lebenstedt is the end of a local line coming from Braunschweig and passing the other train stops of Salzgitter.

=== Public transport ===
There are three bus companies in Salzgitter. The bus network is quite important considering Salzgitter consists of many spread-out villages.

== Economy and infrastructure ==
=== Media ===
In Salzgitter, the daily newspaper Salzgitter-Zeitung and the Sunday newspaper Salzgitter-Woche am Sonntag are published. There is the event calendar Salzgitter Szene and the online magazine Salzgitter-aktuell. Furthermore, the local TV channel TV 38 is broadcast by cable television.

=== Important companies in Salzgitter ===
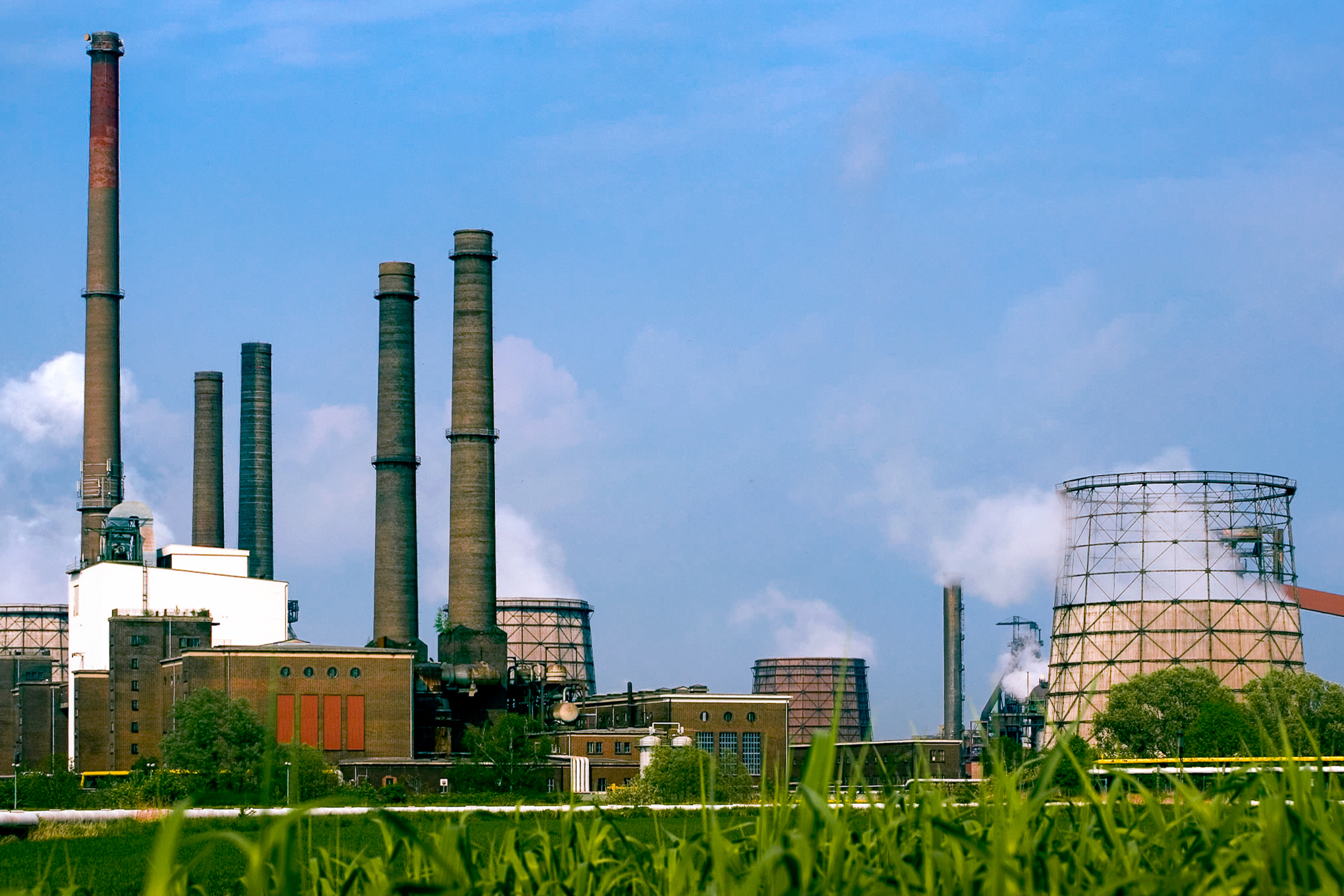
Steel plant of Salzgitter AG

- Alstom Transport
- Salzgitter AG (which had once been the Hermann-Göring-Werke)
- Volkswagenwerk Salzgitter
- Schaper & Brümmer
- MAN
- Robert Bosch GmbH
- SMAG
- IKEA built its biggest storehouse in Salzgitter

=== Public institutions ===
Salzgitter is seat of these public institutions:

- Bundesamt für Strahlenschutz, the Federal Radiation Protection Office of Germany, founded in 1989
- Central Registration Office of the State Judiciary Administration of Lower-Saxony

=== Education ===
The Ostfalia University of Applied Sciences has operated a campus in Salzgitter since 1993, which offers studies in a range of fields including logistics, traffic management and sport management.

There are also several primary, secondary and vocational schools, among them the Gymnasium Salzgitter-Bad, the Gymnasium am Fredenberg and the Kranich-Gymnasium, the latter two located in Salzgitter-Lebenstedt. The Volkshochschule Salzgitter offers adult education, with sites in Salzgitter-Bad and in Salzgitter-Lebenstedt.

== Culture and sights ==
=== Libraries ===
There are three public libraries in Salzgitter. The main-library is located in Salzgitter-Lebenstedt (155,000 media) with branch-libraries in Salzgitter-Bad (42,000 media) and Salzgitter-Fredenberg (25,000 media).

=== Theatre ===
There is no theatre in Salzgitter nor any building used as one. Yet there are several representations at various places. For example, in Salzgitter-Bad there is a society rooting in the students' theater of the local grammar-school that supports the amateur play. They act on various stages, with an auditory between 100 and 600 people. Furthermore, there are irregular performances of musicals.

=== Museums ===
- Städtisches Museum Schloss Salder ("Municipal Museum Salder Castle"), free entry, 3500+ sqm of permanent exhibitions about geology, prehistory, history of the city and its region (e. g. about an ichthyosaur, the neanderthals of Lebenstedt, Salzgitter iron ore mining and processing), overall featuring 3000+ exhibits, each year additional special expositions, an outdoor area with technical objects, a working windmill, the ice age path with life-size animal models of mammoth and more.
- Städtische Kunstsammlungen Schloss Salder ("Municipal Art Collection in Salder Castle")

=== Buildings ===
- In the quarter Salzgitter-Lebenstedt:
  - City monument (Turm der Arbeit – "Tower of work", the city's emblem, constructed in 1995. The monument tells about the suffering of the forced workers and Nazi concentration camp prisoners while building up industry during the national socialism, about the flight from home beyond the rivers Oder and Neisse, about the fight against the removal of the iron works and about Salzgitter's people's will to live and to rebuild.)
  - Town hall (built 1959–1963)
  - Ice sports hall (in far-east style)
- In the quarter Salzgitter-Bad:
  - Old Town
  - Thermalsolbad ("hot-springs brine bath")
  - Protestant church St. Mariae Jacobi; military defence church built in 1481
  - Catholic church St. Marien
  - Former Nicolai church (nowadays event room)
  - Salzgitter Bismarck Tower
  - Former town hall at the market place
  - Tilly house
  - farm house in Kniestedt (now care for old people and music school)
  - "Beamtensiedlung" (from 1930, dwellings of the employees of the smelting works)
- pilgrimage church in Salzgitter-Engerode, chapel built in 1236, one of Lower-Saxony's oldest pilgrimage churches with frescos laid open
- Wasserburg (castle), Salzgitter-Gebhardshagen, nearly 1000 years old
- Franzosenbrücke ("French bridge"), stone arch bridge over the river Innerste near Salzgitter-Hohenrode
- Salzgitter-Lichtenberg: Castle ruins, once built by Henry the Lion, destroyed in 1552 and laid open again in the 1950s. Look-out and restaurant.
- Salzgitter-Ringelheim: Ringelheim Castle, former monastery, founded in the 10th century, secularised in 1803. Baroque church built in 1694, including a precious organ; crucifix from the workshop of Bishop Bernward of Hildesheim (around 1000); large castle park (Schlosspark)
- Salzgitter-Salder: Salder Castle with Municipal Museum, former emblem of the city; the castle built in the style of the "Weser Renaissance" around 1600 was domicile of the noble family von Salder in the Duchy of Braunschweig, later domain of the duke; nowadays museum of local history; castle church Maria-Magdalena with a circular floor plan.
- Salzgitter-Thiede: Convent Steterburg, ladies' convent founded in 1003; there are still buildings from the 11th century. The house of the abbess was built in 1691. The church is from 1752. In 1938, the area was reconstructed to tenements.

=== Other sights ===
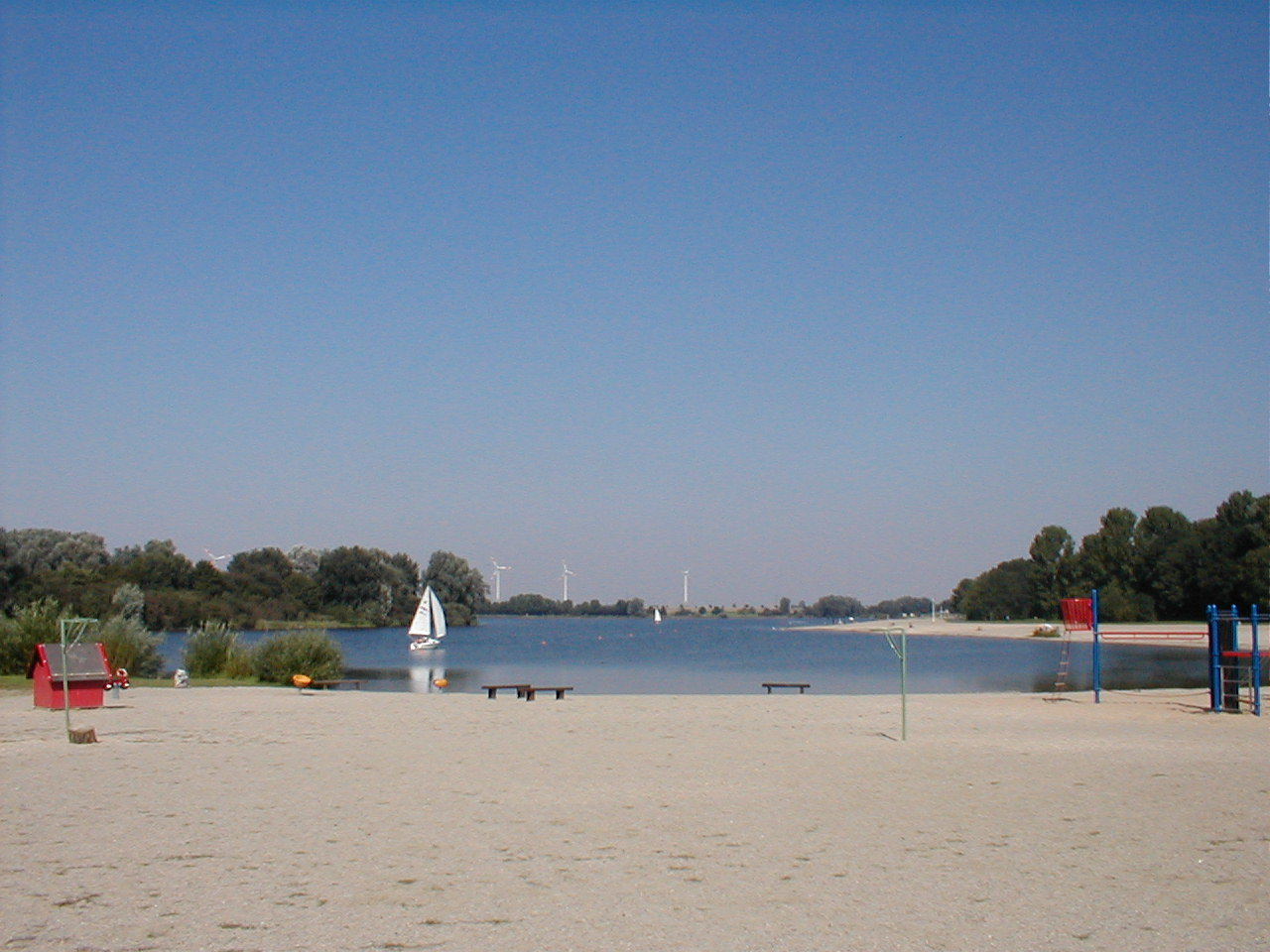
Salzgittersee in 2005

- archeological excavation from the Stone Age in Salzgitter-Lebenstedt
- Farm house Salzgitter-Flachstöckheim with open-air stage and English Park (1756/1821)
- Salzgittersee ("Lake Salzgitter") in Salzgitter-Lebenstedt, beach, water-ski, boats, inliners, diving

=== Regular events ===
- May: municipal sports week in Salzgitter-Lebenstedt
- May: museum festival in Salzgitter-Salder
- May/June: Schützenfest in Salzgitter-Bad
- June/July: Altstadt-Festival (a festival in the old town centre of Salzgitter-Bad) in Salzgitter-Bad

== Twin towns – sister cities ==
Salzgitter is twinned with:

- Imatra, Finland (1970)
- Swindon, United Kingdom (1975)
- Créteil, France (1980)
- Stary Oskol, Russia (1987)
- Gotha, Germany (1988)

== Notable people ==
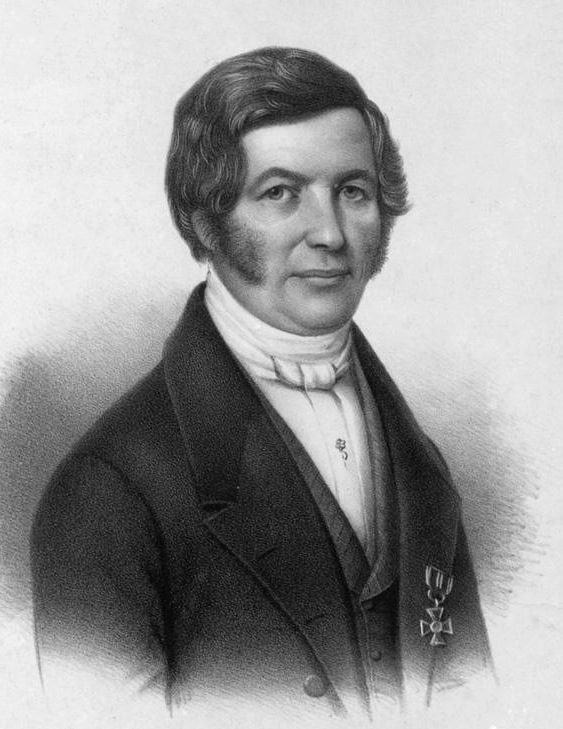
Friedrich Schlemm

- Friedrich Schlemm (1795–1859), physician and anatomist
- Heinrich Ahrens (1808–1874), philosopher
- August Jäger (1808–1848), writer, led the effort at Nazification of the Evangelical Church in Prussia.
- Hermann Lattemann (1852–1894), balloon pilot, experimented with an early prototype of a parachute.
- Wilhelm Wassmuss (1880–1938), diplomat, spy and part of the Niedermayer–Hentig Expedition
- Hagen Stehr (born 1941), German-Australian tuna breeder and entrepreneur
- Hans-Joachim Gehrke (born 1945), historian of ancient and classical antiquity.
- Harald Weiss (born 1949), composer, director, screenwriter and free-lance artist.
- Christian Zwarg (born 1968), audio engineer and mastering engineer
- Şebnem Dönmez (born 1974), Turkish movie and TV series actress and TV show host.
- Gabriela Jolowicz (born 1978), artist known for black-and-white woodcuts.

=== Sport ===
- Wolfgang Dremmler (born 1954), footballer, played 310 games and 27 for Germany
- Andreas Pospich (born 1961), footballer, played over 330 games
- Peter Lux (born 1962), footballer and coach, played over 340 games
- Henrik Stehlik (born 1980), trampoline gymnast, bronze medallist at the 2004 Summer Olympics
- Daniel Theis (born 1992), basketball player

== See also ==
- Metropolitan region Hannover-Braunschweig-Göttingen-Wolfsburg
