= Andreas Pospich =

German footballer (born 1961)

Personal information
- Full name: Andreas Pospich
- Date of birth: 8 December 1961 (age 64)
- Place of birth: Salzgitter, West Germany
- Height: 1.83 m (6 ft 0 in)
- Positions: Forward; defender

Youth career
- –1980: Fortuna Lebenstedt

Senior career*
Years	Team	Apps	(Gls)
1980–1984	SV Union Salzgitter	131	(56)
1984–1991	Eintracht Braunschweig	202	(21)
1991	Stahl Eisenhüttenstadt		
- * Club domestic league appearances and goals as of 1 May 2012

Andreas Pospich (born 8 December 1961) is a retired German footballer. He spent one season with Eintracht Braunschweig in the Bundesliga, as well as five seasons in the 2. Bundesliga. At the end of his career he also had a brief stint with Stahl Eisenhüttenstadt, playing two games in the 1991–92 European Cup Winners' Cup.
