= Panentheism (Ismailism) =

Religious term

Ismaili Shi'a believe in panentheism, meaning God is both reality and transcendent of it. While the figure of the Godhead is beyond this universe, even beyond the categories of existence/non-existence and being/non-being, the Godhead has created the Universal Intellect or aql-e-kul through his Divine Command or amr. The Universal Intellect/Nous/First Cause is the first created being which is the manifestation of the Unconditioned, Simple and Transcendental Godhead. The Universal Intellect contains and encompasses everything that falls under the categories of being and existence, including all living beings.The Imam is the pure, perfect soul that reflects the Light or nur of the Universal Intellect acting as its Epiphany on the face of the Earth. Therefore, salvation for the Ismailis is to gain recognition and vision or deedar of the nur of the Imam which is the Universal Intellect.
