= Gabriela Jolowicz =

German artist

Gabriela Jolowicz (born 1978) is a German artist known for her detailed black-and-white woodcuts.

== Biography ==
Gabriela Jolowicz was born in 1978 in Salzgitter. She grew up in Salzgitter. She studied communication design at the University of Applied Sciences and Arts in Hildesheim before entering the Academy of Fine Arts Leipzig (Hochschule für Grafik und Buchkunst) in 2002, where she was a student of Volker Pfüller and Thomas M. Müller.

Her diploma work consisted of a series of 24 woodcuts, published in 2008 by Lubok Verlag under the direction of Christoph Ruckhäberle.

In 2012, she won the first prize of the international competition "Woodcut Today" held by the Foundation for Art, Culture and Education of the Kreissparkasse Ludwigsburg.

She has lectured at the Berlin University of the Arts, the Academy of Fine Arts Leipzig, and at the University of the Arts in Bremen. She lives and works in Berlin.

== Work ==
Jolowicz's woodcuts frequently depict scenes from everyday contemporary life. Moments that today are often photographed and shared via smartphones and social media are translated by her into one of the most traditional graphic media, the woodcut. The choice of motifs and her strict limitation to black-and-white often evoke associations with comics and graphic novels.

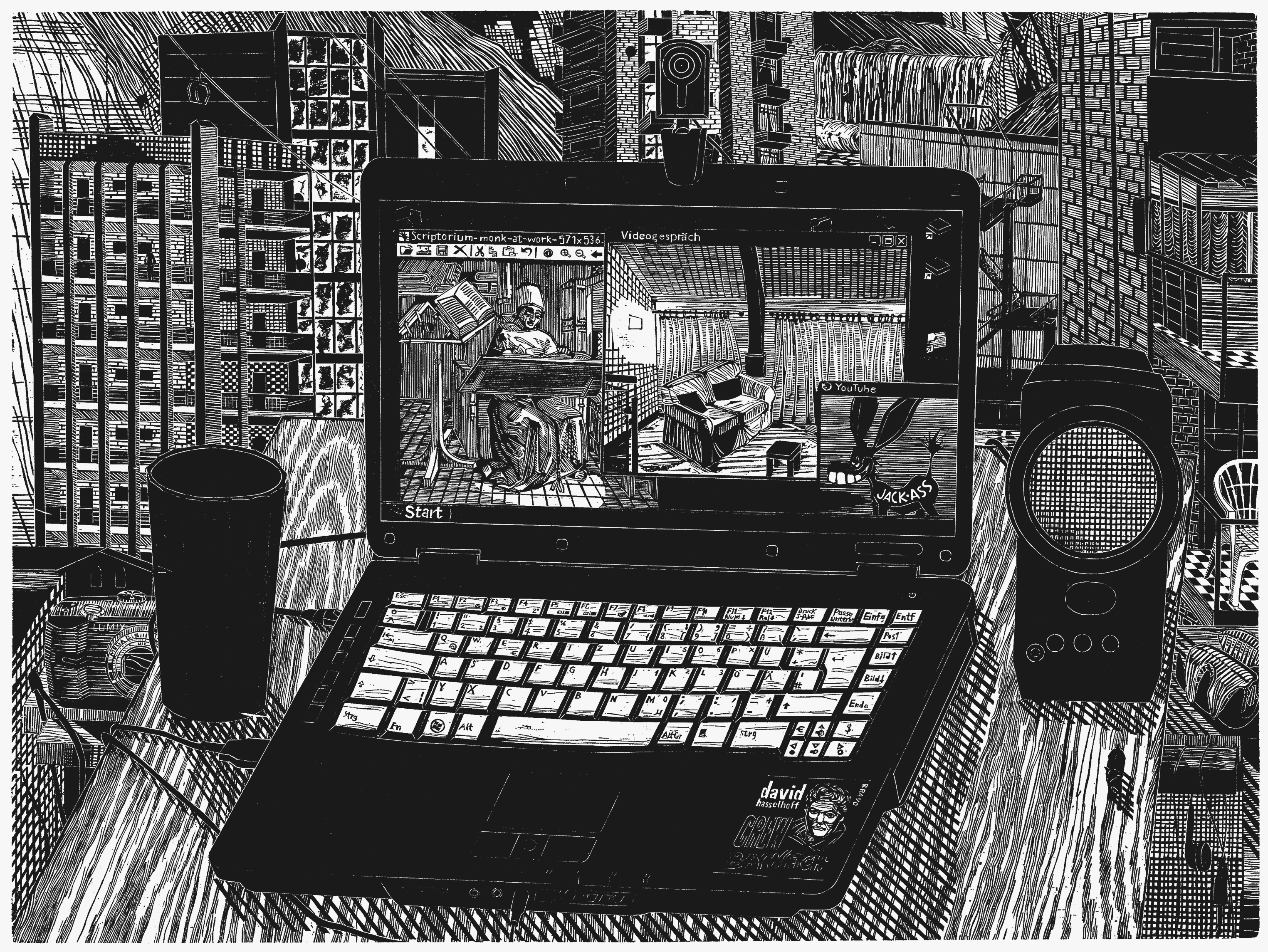
Gabriela Jolowicz: Laptop, Woodcut, 2010, 45 cm × 60 cm

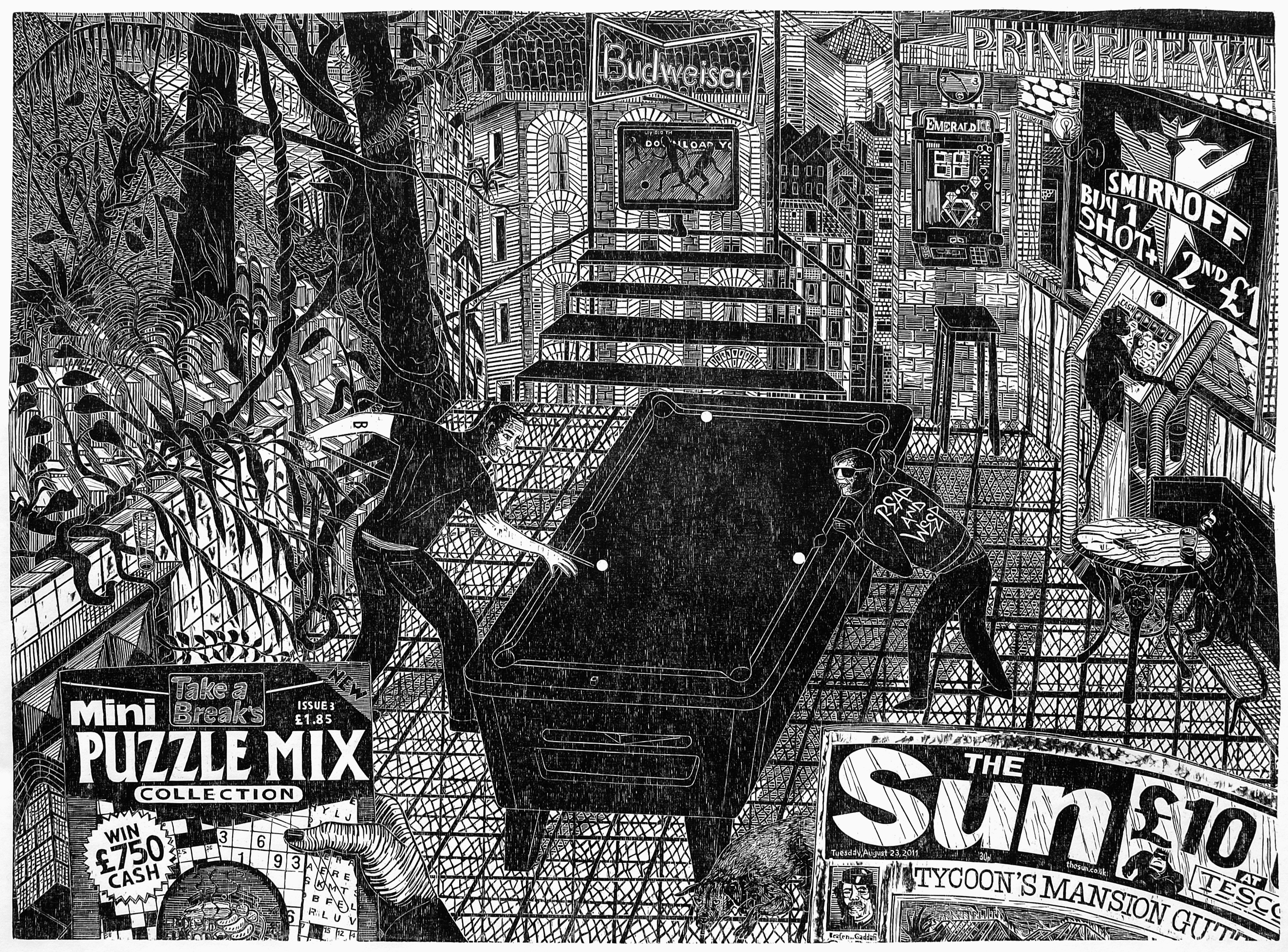
Gabriela Jolowicz: System of a Clown, Woodcut, 2012, 66,5 cm × 90,6 cm

== Selected exhibitions ==
- 2026: Gabriela Jolowicz. Pool and Prime, Museum of the Printing Arts Leipzig
- 2026: Woodcuts - Holzschnitte, Gabriela Jolowicz, Sprengel Museum Hannover
- 2025: Snack Machine Berlin / Mein Deutschland (with Zoya Cherkassky-Nnadi), Thaler Originalgrafik, Leipzig
- 2025: Gabriela Jolowicz – The Infinite Woodcut, Kunsthalle Erfurt (solo exhibition)
- 2024: Kirchner Woodcuts (with Benjamin Badock and Thomas Kilpper), Kunsthalle Bremen, Exhibition
- 2022: Scenes from the City: A Multidimensional Journey, Goethe-Institut Czech Republic, Prague (solo)
- 2021: Among Us (with Anna Haifisch), Thaler Originalgrafik, Leipzig
- 2019: Gratwanderung, Kunsthaus Stade
- 2019: Gratwanderung, August Macke Haus, Bonn
- 2018: Enclaves (with Moki, Gosia Machon & Inga Kählke), Feinkunst Krüger, Hamburg
- 2017: Off Licence, Galerie Hübner + Hübner, Frankfurt am Main (solo)
- 2017: Church Playground, Open Studio Gallery, Toronto, Canada (solo)
- 2015: Present Density, Society of Northern Alberta Print-Artists (SNAP), Edmonton, Canada (solo)
- 2013: Das Wandern der Schatten, Feinkunst Krüger, Hamburg
- 2013: Sol Niger (with Lou Hoyer and Steingrimur Eyfjord), Galerie Christian Ehrentraut, Berlin
- 2013: New Prints / New Narratives, International Print Center New York
- 2012: The Monkey on My Back, Galerie Emmanuel Post, Berlin (solo)
- 2012: Lubok exhibition, Museo Nacional de la Estampa, Mexico City
- 2012: Lubok Graphic Show (with Sebastian Gögel and Christoph Ruckhäberle), Printroom, Rotterdam
- 2011: Lubok – Artist Books from Leipzig, Städtisches Kunstmuseum Spendhaus, Reutlingen
- 2010: Now Playing, Galerie Hafenrand, Hamburg (solo)
- 2010: Now Playing, Galerie Emmanuel Post, Leipzig (solo)
- 2010: Schnittstelle Druck, Museum of Fine Arts Leipzig & Academy of Fine Arts Leipzig

== Selected publications ==
- 2026: Gabriela Jolowicz. Wallstein Verlag, Göttingen. ISBN 978-3-8353-6071-6
- 2024: Kirchner Woodcuts. Lubok Verlag, Leipzig. ISBN 978-3-910704-07-7.
- 2022: The Ground Swaying Under the Feet. Maro Verlag. ISBN 978-3-87512-622-8.
- 2021: Megabillig 2. Lubok Verlag, Leipzig. ISBN 978-3-945111-72-7.
- 2017: Yo, Future! In: Spring magazine. Mairisch Verlag, Hamburg. ISBN 978-3-938539-46-0.
- 2012: Museo Nacional de la Estampa, Mexico City. Lubok Verlag. ISBN 978-3-941601-58-1
- 2011: Lubok in Reutlingen. Lubok Verlag.ISBN 978-3-941601-48-2
- 2008: Megabillig. Lubok Verlag, Leipzig. (no ISBN)
- 2007 Lubok 2. Lubok Verlag Leipzig. (no ISBN)
