= Salzgittersee =

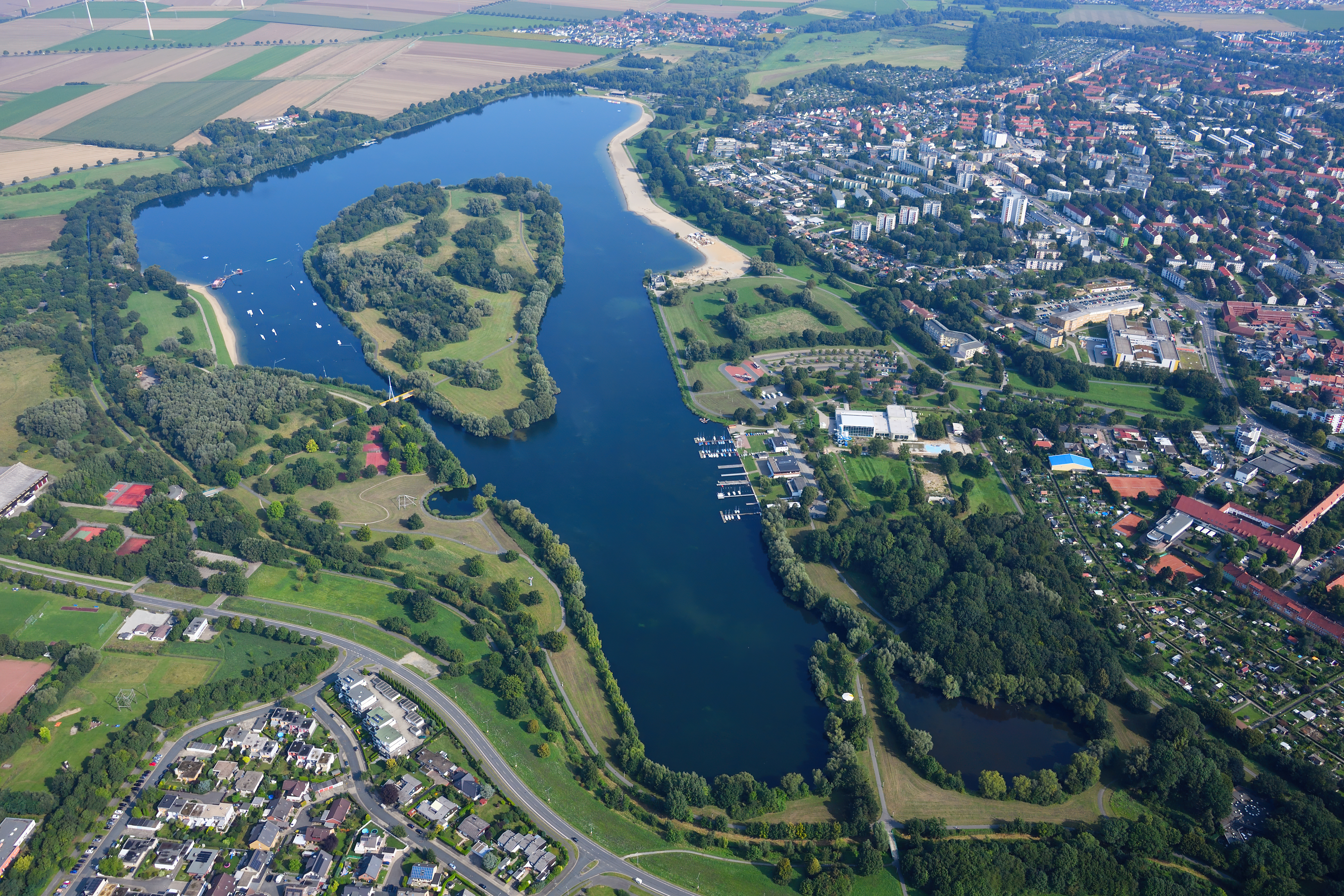

- Location within Lower Saxony
- Location: Lower Saxony
- Coordinates: 52°9′25″N 10°18′18″E
- Type: artificial lake
- Basin countries: Germany
- Max. length: 2,120 m (6,960 ft)
- Max. width: 800 m (2,600 ft)
- Surface area: 0.75 km^{2} (0.29 sq mi)
- Average depth: 2.5 m (8 ft 2 in)
- Max. depth: 17 m (56 ft)
- Water volume: 1,875,000 m^{3} (66,200,000 cu ft)
- Surface elevation: 78 m (256 ft)

Salzgittersee (Salzgitter Lake) is a lake in the city of Salzgitter in Lower Saxony, Germany. At an elevation of 78 m, its surface area is 0.75 km^{2}.

== Gallery ==
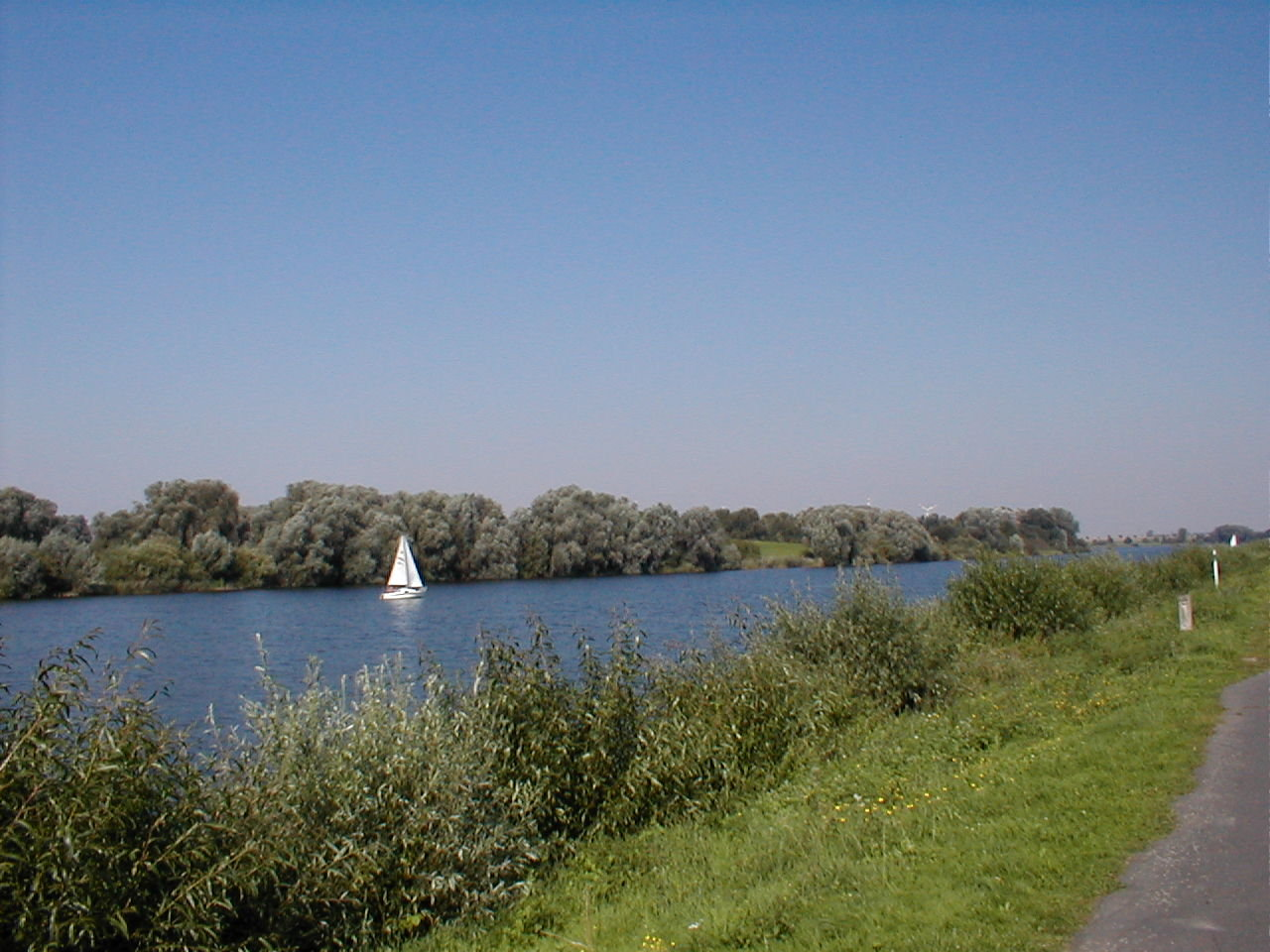
Salzgitter Lake in 2005

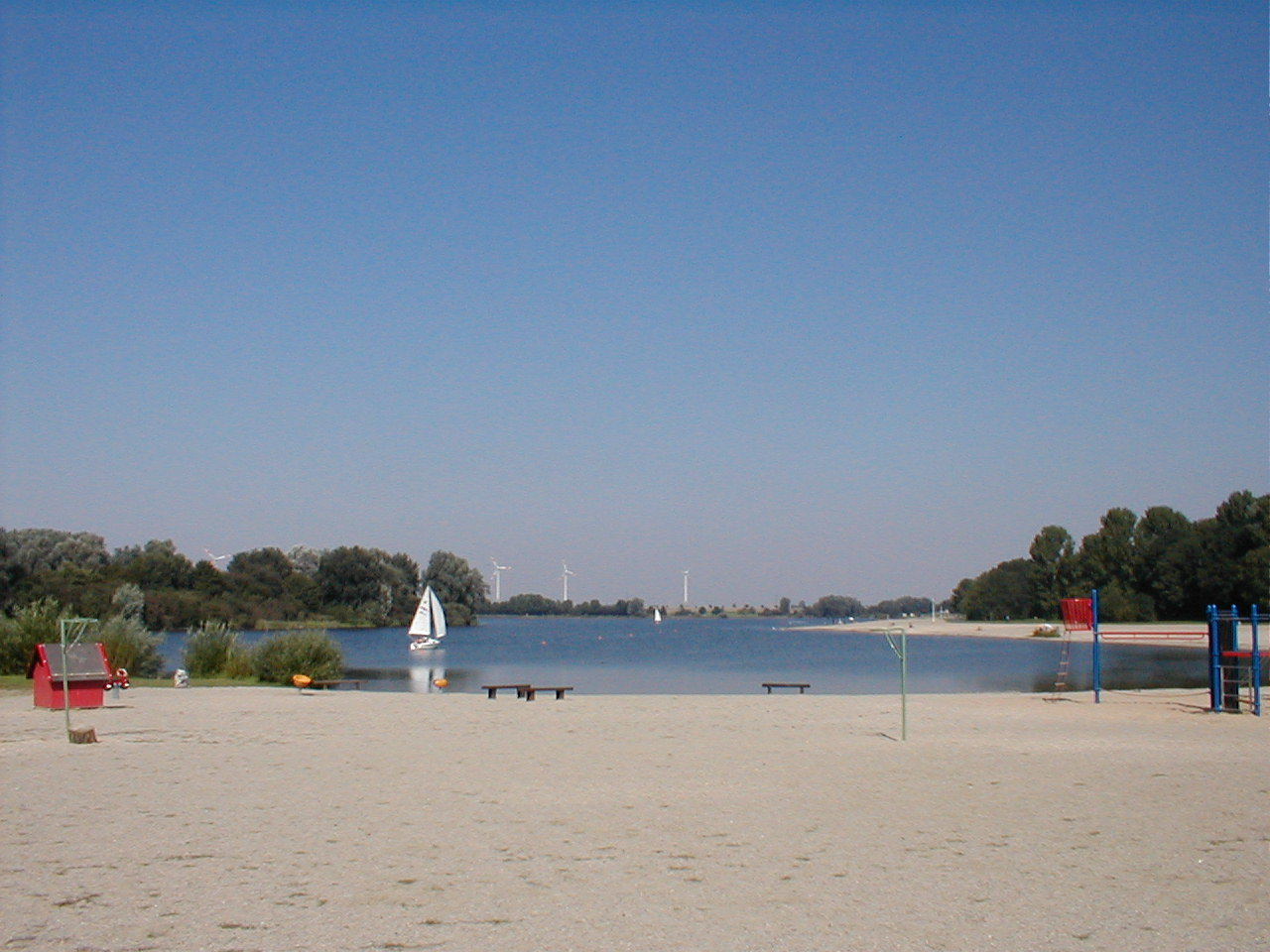

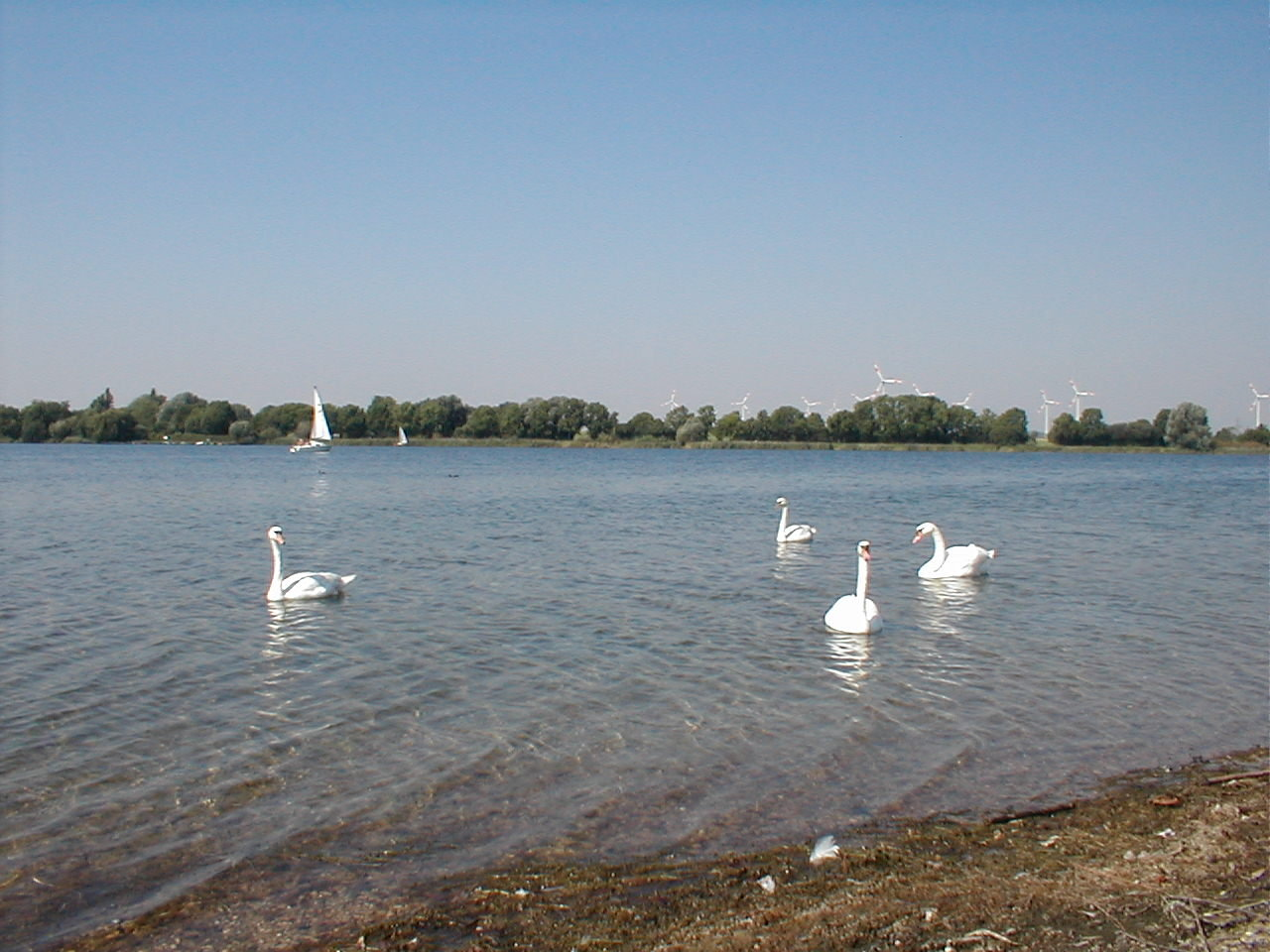
