= Friedrich Schlemm =

German anatomist (1795–1858)

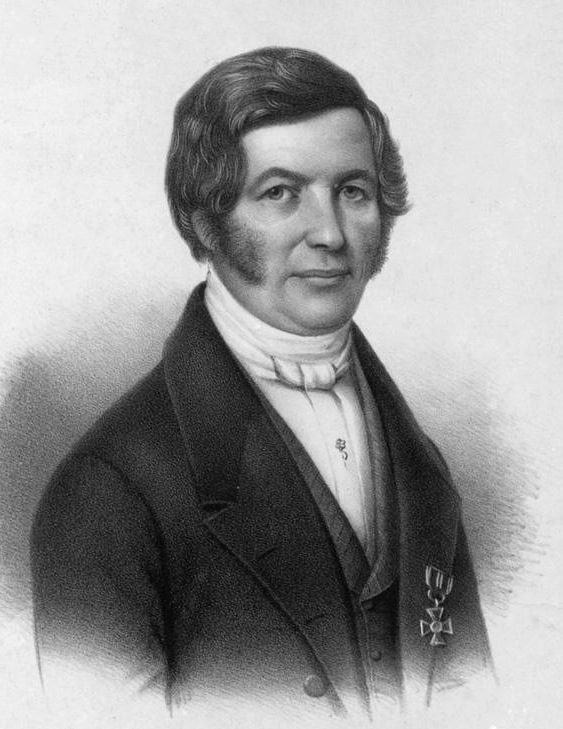
- Friedrich Schlemm
- Born: 11 December 1795; Salzgitter
- Died: 27 May 1858 (aged 62)
- Known for: Schlemm's canal
- Scientific career
- Fields: anatomy
- Workplaces: University of Berlin

Friedrich Schlemm (11 December 1795 – 27 May 1858) was a German anatomist who was professor at the University of Berlin.

He was born in Salzgitter. As his family could not afford higher education, he was apprenticed to a barber-surgeon in Braunschweig. This gave him the opportunity to study anatomy and surgery at the local Anatomico-Surgical Institute. In 1821 he received his medical doctorate from the University of Berlin, and became Prosector at the university in 1823. In 1829 he became "professor extraordinary" of anatomy, and attained the title of "full professor" in 1833.

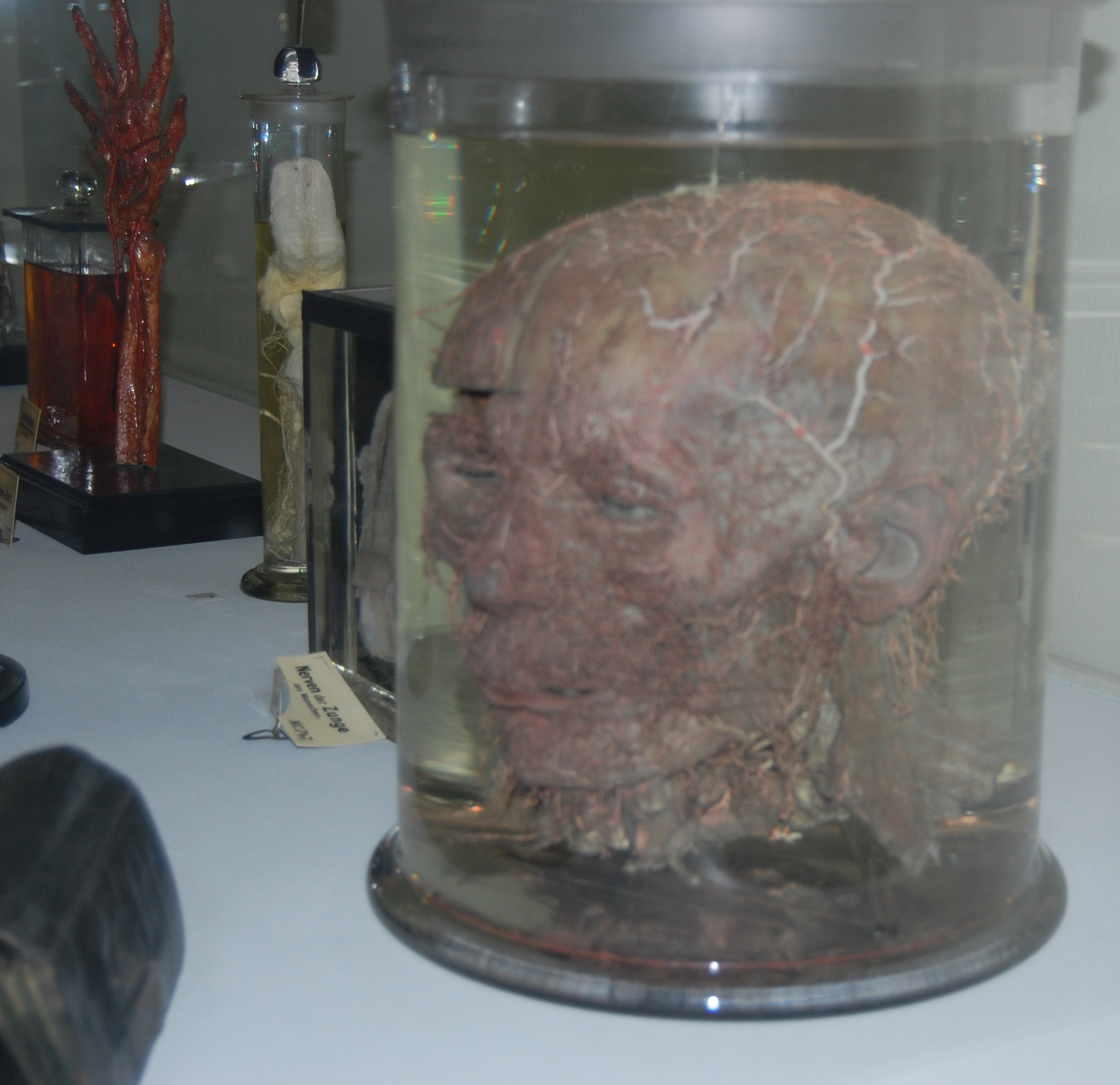
Skull with meticulously separated arteries prepared by Friedrich Schlemm. Displayed in the Center for Anatomy at University of Berlin (2008).

Recently discovered archival sources demonstrate that, in June 1816, Schlemm and a fellow student disinterred the body of a deceased woman late at night in a Braunschweig churchyard to bring the body to this Institute and study the effects of rickets on the woman's bones. They were caught and sentenced to 4 weeks of prison. Subsequently, Schlemm left Braunschweig and found work as a low-rank army surgeon in Berlin. Professor Rudolphi, the director of the Berlin Institute of Anatomy, took note of Schlemm's manual dexterity in anatomical dissection and supported his impressive career. Schlemm eventually became full professor of anatomy in 1833 and spent his remaining 25 years in Berlin with a focus on teaching students and training surgeons. As historical background information is largely lacking in this regard, it is impossible to decide whether Schlemm's episode of grave robbing was a solitary instance or a more common method of acquiring bodies for anatomical instruction in early 19th-century Germany.

Schlemm was known for his pathological studies on cadavers. He was the first to discover the corneal nerves of the eye, which he describes in his 1830 treatise named Arteriarum capitis superficialum icon nova. He is known today for the eponymous Schlemm's canal, which is a channel in the eye that collects aqueous humor from the anterior chamber and delivers it into the bloodstream.

== External Source ==
- "Friedrich Schlemm". Who Named It?. Archived from the original on November 9, 2002.
