= Heinrich Ahrens =

German philosopher and jurist (1808–1874)

Julius Heinrich Ahrens (14 July 1808 – 2 August 1874) was a German philosopher, jurist, and professor in Brussels, Graz, and Leipzig.

== Life ==
Born in Salzgitter, Ahrens studied in Wolfenbüttel and the University of Göttingen. Ahrens, whose main interest was the philosophy of law and the state, was a disciple of Karl Christian Friedrich Krause, with whom he defended his habilitation De confoederatione germanica (Of the German Confederation) in 1830.

After being forced to leave Hanover as a result of his participation in the revolutionary movements there in 1831, he spread the knowledge of Krause's system in France and Belgium through lectures in Paris in 1830 and in Brussels in 1834 and through his extensive writing activity. He was a professor in Brussels during the years 1834–50.

In 1848, Ahrens returned to Germany and was sent by the electors of his hometown as a deputy to the Frankfurt parliament. He resigned from the parliament in 1849 along with the other Hanoverians. In 1850 he became a professor in Graz and in 1859 in Leipzig.

He died in Salzgitter.

His works include Cours de droit naturel (Paris 1838), published in German under the title Naturrecht oder Philosophie des Rechts und des Staates (1856, sixth edition Vienna 1870–71), and Juristische Encyklopädie ( 1855–57).

== Works ==
- De confoederatione germanica. Göttingen 1830.
- Cours de droit naturel. Paris 1839.
- Staatslehre Organische Philosophisch-anthropologischer auf Grundlage. Vienna 1850.
- Fichte 's politische in ihrer wissenschaftlichen Lehre, culturgeschichtlichen allgemeinen Nationalen und Bedeutung: Festrede zur Fichtefeier an der Universität Leipzig. Leipzig 1862.
- Naturrecht Das oder nach dem die Rechtsphilosophie gegenwärtigen Zustand dieser Wissenschaft in Deutschland. 6th ed. Vienna 1870-71 (2 vols.)
- Juristische Encyklopädie. Vienna 1855-57
