= Panentheism =

Belief that the divine pervades all of space and time and also extends beyond it

Panentheism (/pæˈnɛnθiɪzəm/; "all in God", from the Greek πᾶν, pân, 'all', ἐν, en, 'in' and Θεός, Theós, 'God') is the belief that the divine intersects every part of the universe and also extends beyond space and time. The term was coined by the German philosopher Karl Krause in 1828 to distinguish the ideas of Georg Wilhelm Friedrich Hegel (1770–1831) and Friedrich Wilhelm Joseph Schelling (1775–1854) about the relation of God and the universe from the supposed pantheism of Baruch Spinoza. Unlike pantheism, which holds that the divine and the universe are identical, panentheism maintains an ontological distinction between the divine and the non-divine and the significance of both.

In panentheism, the universal spirit is present everywhere, which at the same time "transcends" all things created. Whilst pantheism asserts that "all is God", panentheism claims that God is greater than the universe. Some versions of panentheism suggest that the universe is nothing more than the manifestation of God. In addition, some forms indicate that the universe is contained within God, like in the Kabbalistic concept of Tzimtzum, or with the Sufi concept of Wahdat al-wujud. Much of Hindu thought is highly characterized by panentheism and pantheism.

== In philosophy ==
Baruch Spinoza later claimed that "Whatsoever is, is in God, and without God nothing can be, or be conceived." "Individual things are nothing but modifications of the attributes of God, or modes by which the attributes of God are expressed in a fixed and definite manner." Though Spinoza has been called the "prophet" and "prince" of pantheism, in a letter to Henry Oldenburg Spinoza states that: "as to the view of certain people that I identify God with nature (taken as a kind of mass or corporeal matter), they are quite mistaken". For Spinoza, our universe (cosmos) is a mode under two attributes of Thought and Extension. God has infinitely many other attributes which are not present in our world.

According to German philosopher Karl Jaspers, when Spinoza wrote "Deus sive Natura" (God or Nature) Spinoza did not mean to say that God and Nature are interchangeable terms, but rather that God's transcendence was attested by God's infinitely many attributes, and that two attributes known by humans, namely Thought and Extension, signified God's immanence. Furthermore, Martial Guéroult suggested the term panentheism, rather than pantheism to describe Spinoza's view of the relation between God and the world. The world is not God, but it is, in a strong sense, "in" God. Yet, American philosopher and self-described panentheist Charles Hartshorne referred to Spinoza's philosophy as "classical pantheism" and distinguished Spinoza's philosophy from panentheism.

In 1828, the German philosopher Karl Christian Friedrich Krause (1781–1832) seeking to reconcile monotheism and pantheism, coined the term panentheism (from the Ancient Greek expression πᾶν ἐν θεῷ, pān en theṓ, literally "all in god"). This conception of God influenced New England transcendentalists such as Ralph Waldo Emerson. The term was popularized by Charles Hartshorne in his development of process theology and has also been closely identified with the New Thought. The formalization of this term in the West in the 19th century was not new; philosophical treatises had been written on it in the context of Hinduism for millennia.

Philosophers who embraced panentheism have included Thomas Hill Green (1839–1882), James Ward (1843–1925), Andrew Seth Pringle-Pattison (1856–1931) and Samuel Alexander (1859–1938). Beginning in the 1940s, Hartshorne examined numerous conceptions of God. He reviewed and discarded pantheism, deism, and pandeism in favor of panentheism, finding that such a "doctrine contains all of deism and pandeism except their arbitrary negations". Hartshorne formulated God as a being who could become "more perfect": God has absolute perfection in categories for which absolute perfection is possible, and relative perfection (i. e., is superior to all others) in categories for which perfection cannot be precisely determined.

== In religion ==
=== Christianity ===
Panentheism is also a feature of some Christian philosophical theologies and resonates strongly within the theological tradition of the Eastern Orthodox Church. It also appears in process theology. Process theological thinkers are generally regarded as unorthodox in the Christian West. Furthermore, process philosophy is widely believed to have paved the way for open theism, a movement that tends to associate itself primarily with the Evangelical branch of Protestantism but is also generally considered unorthodox by most evangelicals.

==== Catholic panentheism ====
A number of ordained Catholic writers (including Richard Rohr, David Steindl-Rast, and Thomas Keating) have suggested that panentheism is the original view of Christianity. They hold that such a view is directly supported by mystical experience and the teachings of Jesus and Paul the Apostle. Richard Rohr surmises this in his 2019 book The Universal Christ:

But Paul merely took incarnationalism to its universal and logical conclusions. We see that in his bold exclamation “There is only Christ. He is everything and he is in everything” (Colossians 3:11). If I were to write that today, people would call me a pantheist (the universe is God), whereas I am really a panentheist (God lies within all things, but also transcends them), exactly like both Jesus and Paul.

Similarly, David Steindl-Rast posits that Christianity's original panentheism is being revealed through contemporary mystical insight:

What characterizes our moment in history is the collapse of Christian theism. Gratefulness mysticism makes us realize that Christianity never was theistic, but panentheistic. Faith in God as triune implied this from the very beginning; now we are becoming aware of it. It becomes obvious, at the same time, that we share this Trinitarian experience of divine life with all human beings as a spiritual undercurrent in all religions, an undercurrent older and more powerful than the various doctrines. At the core of interreligious dialogue flows this shared spirituality of gratefulness, a spirituality strong enough to restore to our broken world unity.

This sentiment is mirrored in Thomas Keating's 1993 article, Clarifications Regarding Centering Prayer:

Pantheism is usually defined as the identification of God with creation in such a way that the two are indistinguishable. Panentheism means that God is present in all creation by virtue of his omnipresence and omnipotence, sustaining every creature in being without being identified with any creature. The latter understanding is what Jesus seems to have been describing when he prays "that all might be one, Father, as we are one" and "that they may also be in us" (John 17:22). Again and again, in the Last Supper discourse, he speaks of this oneness and his intentions to send his Spirit to dwell within us. If we understand the writings of the great mystics rightly, they experience God living within them all the time. Thus the affirmation of God's transcendence must always be balanced by the affirmation of his imminence both on the natural plane and on the plane of grace.

==== Panentheism in other Christian confessions ====
Panentheistic conceptions of God occur amongst some modern theologians. Process theology and Creation Spirituality, two recent developments in Christian theology, contain panentheistic ideas. Charles Hartshorne (1897–2000), who conjoined process theology with panentheism, maintained a lifelong membership in the Methodist church but was also a Unitarian. In later years, he joined the Austin, Texas, Unitarian Universalist congregation and was an active participant in that church. Referring to ideas such as Thomas Oord's theocosmocentrism (2010), the soft panentheism of open theism, Keith Ward's comparative theology and John Polkinghorne's critical realism (2009), Raymond Potgieter observes distinctions such as dipolar and bipolar:

The former suggests two poles separated such as God influencing creation and it in turn its creator (Bangert 2006:168), whereas bipolarity completes God’s being implying interdependence between temporal and eternal poles. (Marbaniang 2011:133), in dealing with Whitehead’s approach, does not make this distinction. I use the term bipolar as a generic term to include suggestions of the structural definition of God’s transcendence and immanence; to for instance accommodate a present and future reality into which deity must reasonably fit and function, and yet maintain separation from this world and evil whilst remaining within it.

Some argue that panentheism should also include the notion that God has always been related to some world or another, which denies the idea of creation out of nothing (creatio ex nihilo). Nazarene Methodist theologian Thomas Jay Oord (born 1965) advocates panentheism, but he uses the word "theocosmocentrism" to highlight the notion that God and some world or another are the primary conceptual starting blocks for eminently fruitful theology. This form of panentheism helps overcome the problem of evil and proposes that God's love for the world is essential to who God is.

The Latter Day Saint movement teaches that the Light of Christ "proceeds from God through Christ and gives life and light to all things".

=== Gnosticism ===
Manichaeists, being of another gnostic sect, preached a very different doctrine in positioning the true Manichaean God against matter as well as other deities, that it described as enmeshed with the world, namely the gods of Jews, Christians, and pagans. Nevertheless, this dualistic teaching included an elaborate cosmological myth that narrates the defeat of primal man by the powers of darkness that devoured and imprisoned the particles of light.

Valentinianism taught that matter came about through emanations of the supreme being, even if, to some, this event is held to be more accidental than intentional. To other gnostics, these emanations were akin to the Sephirot of the Kabbalists and deliberate manifestations of a transcendent God through a complex system of intermediaries.

=== Hinduism ===
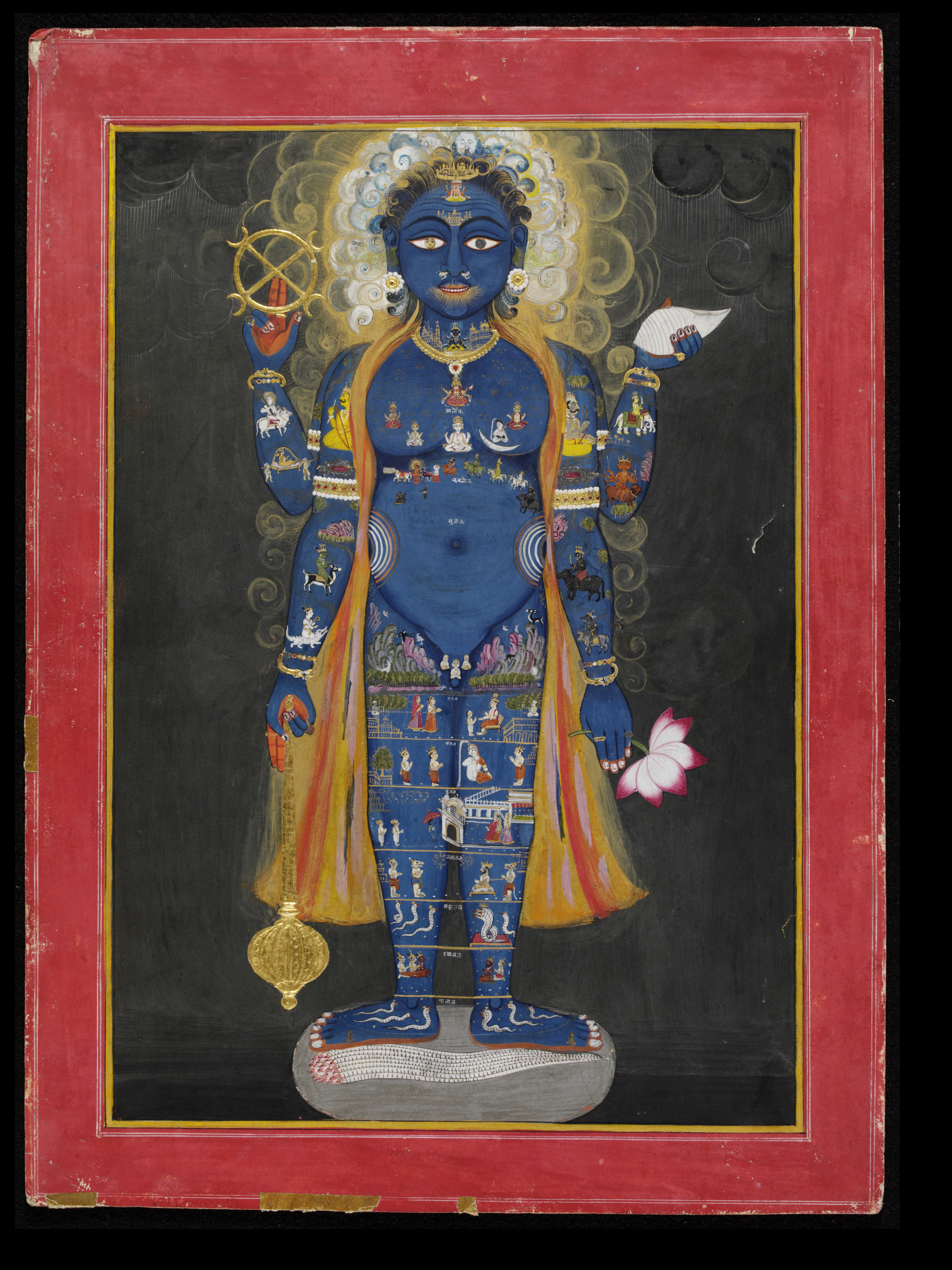
Depiction of the Vishnu Vishvarupa (Purusha), within which all the devas and universe is contained

The earliest reference to panentheistic thought in Hindu philosophy is in a creationism contained in the later section of Rig Veda called the Purusha Sukta, which was compiled before 1100 BCE. The Purusha Sukta gives a description of the spiritual unity of the cosmos. It presents the nature of Purusha, or the cosmic being, as both immanent in the manifested world and yet transcendent. From this being the sukta holds, the original creative will proceeds, by which this vast universe is projected in space and time.

The most influential and dominant school of Indian philosophy, Advaita Vedanta, rejects theism and dualism by insisting that "Brahman [ultimate reality] is without parts or attributes...one without a second." Since Brahman has no properties, contains no internal diversity and is identical with the whole reality, it cannot be understood as an anthropomorphic personal God. The relationship between Brahman and the creation is often thought to be panentheistic.

Panentheism is also expressed in the Bhagavad Gita. In verse IX.4, Krishna states:

By Me all this universe is pervaded through My unmanifested form.
All beings abide in Me but I do not abide in them.

Many schools of Hindu thought espouse monistic theism, which is believed to be similar to a panentheistic viewpoint. Nimbarka's school of differential monism (Dvaitadvaita), Ramanuja's school of qualified monism (Vishistadvaita), and Saiva Siddhanta and Kashmir Shaivism are all considered to be panentheistic. Chaitanya Mahaprabhu's Gaudiya Vaishnavism, which elucidates the doctrine of Achintya Bheda Abheda (inconceivable oneness and difference), is also thought to be panentheistic. In Kashmir Shaivism, all things are believed to be a manifestation of Universal Consciousness (Cit or Brahman). So from the point of view of this school, the phenomenal world (Śakti) is real, and it exists and has its being in Consciousness (Ćit). Thus, Kashmir Shaivism also propounds theistic monism or panentheism.

Shaktism, or Tantra, is regarded as an Indian prototype of panentheism. Shakti is considered to be the cosmos itself – she is the embodiment of energy and dynamism and the motivating force behind all action and existence in the material universe. Shiva is her transcendent masculine aspect, providing the divine ground of all being. "There is no Shiva without Shakti, or Shakti without Shiva. The two ... in themselves are One." Thus, it is she who becomes the time and space, the cosmos; it is she who becomes the five elements, and thus all animate life and inanimate forms. She is the primordial energy that holds all creation and destruction, all cycles of birth and death, all laws of cause and effect within herself, and yet is greater than the sum total of all these. She is transcendent but becomes immanent as the cosmos (Mula Prakriti). She, the primordial energy, directly becomes matter.

=== Buddhism ===
==== Zen Buddhism ====
The Reverend Zen Master Soyen Shaku was the first Zen Buddhist Abbot to tour the United States in 1905–6. He wrote a series of essays collected in the book Zen For Americans. In the essay titled "The God Conception of Buddhism," he attempts to explain how a Buddhist looks at the Ultimate without an anthropomorphic God figure while still being able to relate to the term God in a Buddhist sense:

At the outset, let me state that Buddhism is not atheistic as the term is ordinarily understood. It has certainly a God, the highest reality and truth, through which and in which this universe exists. However, the followers of Buddhism usually avoid the term God, for it savors so much of Christianity, whose spirit is not always exactly in accord with the Buddhist interpretation of religious experience. Again, Buddhism is not pantheistic in the sense that it identifies the universe with God. On the other hand, the Buddhist God is absolute and transcendent; this world, being merely its manifestation, is necessarily fragmental and imperfect. To define more exactly the Buddhist notion of the highest being, it may be convenient to borrow the term very happily coined by a modern German scholar, "panentheism," according to which God is πᾶν καὶ ἕν (all and one) and more than the totality of existence.

The essay then goes on to explain first utilizing the term "God" for the American audience to get an initial understanding of what he means by "panentheism," and then discusses the terms that Buddhism uses in place of "God" such as Dharmakaya, Buddha or Adi-Buddha, and Tathagata.

The Tibetologist Geoffrey Samuel has compared Tibetan Buddhism with panentheism.

In Huayan Buddhism and Shingon Buddhism, the Dharmakaya is also named Vairocana, and is declared that Vairocana Buddha exists everywhere and every time in the universe, and the universe itself is his creation and his body.

=== Judaism ===
The panentheistic conception of God can be found within the Jewish mystical tradition. A leading scholar of Kabbalah, Moshe Idel, ascribes this doctrine to the kabbalistic system of Moses ben Jacob Cordovero (1522–1570), and in the eighteenth century, to the Baal Shem Tov (c. 1700–1760), founder of the Hasidic movement, as well as his contemporaries, Rabbi Dov Ber of Mezeritch (died 1772) and Menahem Mendel, the Maggid of Bar. There is some debate as to whether Isaac Luria (1534–1572) and Lurianic Kabbalah, with its doctrine of tzimtzum, can be regarded as panentheistic. Today, panentheism is probably the most correct way to define the Orthodox Jewish theology, specially the Hasidic cosmovision.

According to Hasidism, the infinite Ein Sof is incorporeal and exists in a state that is both transcendent and immanent. This also appears to be the view of non-Hasidic Rabbi Chaim of Volozhin. Hasidic Judaism merges the ideal of nullification with a transcendent God via the intellectual articulation of inner dimensions through Kabbalah and with emphasis on the panentheistic divine immanence in everything.

Many scholars would argue that "panentheism" is the best single-word description of the philosophical theology of Baruch Spinoza, a Jew. It is therefore no surprise that aspects of panentheism are also evident in the theology of Reconstructionist Judaism as presented in the writings of Mordecai Kaplan (1881–1983), who Spinoza strongly influenced.

The basic source of the Jewish panentheism is Tanach, specifically in Kohelet 1:2. The Hebrew term “Ein Od Milvado” is translated as “there is nothing but Him [God]”.

=== Sikhism ===
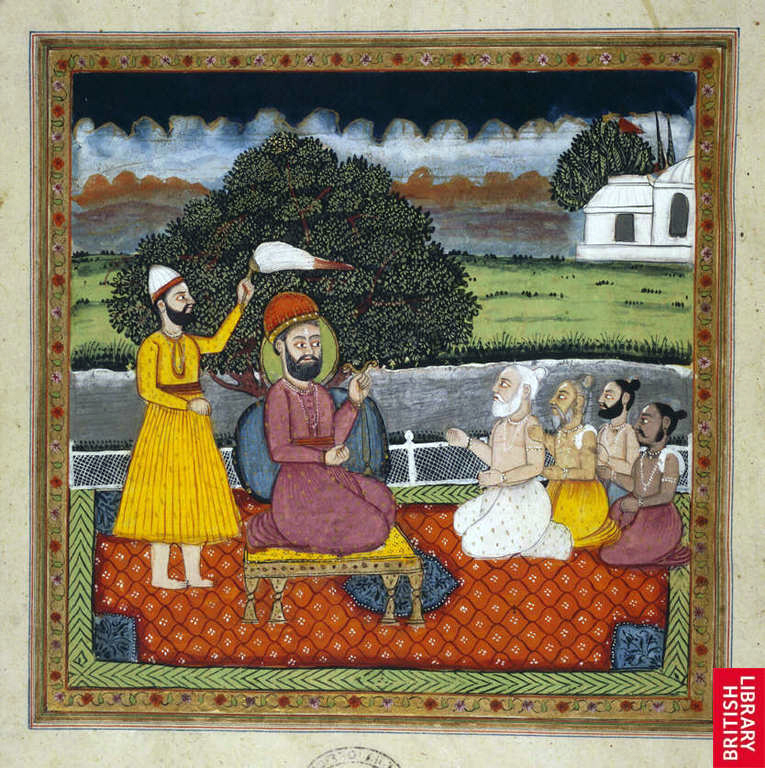
Guru Nanak talking to Hindu sadhus (holy men)

Many newer, contemporary Sikhs have suggested that human souls and the monotheistic God are two different realities (dualism), distinguishing it from the monistic and various shades of nondualistic philosophies of other Indian religions. However, Sikh scholars have explored nondualist exegesis of Sikh scriptures, such as Bhai Vir Singh. According to Mandair, Vir Singh interprets the Sikh scriptures as teaching nonduality. Sikh scholar Bhai Mani Singh is quoted as saying that Sikhism has all the essence of Vedanta Philosophy. Historically, the Sikh symbol of Ik Oankaar has had a monist meaning and has been reduced to simply meaning, "There is but One God", which is incorrect. Older exegesis of Sikh scripture, such as the Faridkot Teeka and Garab Ganjani Teeka, has always described Sikh Metaphysics as a non-dual, panentheistic universe. For this reason, Sikh Metaphysics has often been compared to the Non-Dual Vedanta metaphysics. The Sikh Poet, Bhai Nand Lal, often used Sufi terms to describe Sikh philosophy, talking about wahdat ul-wujud in his Persian poetry.

=== Islam ===
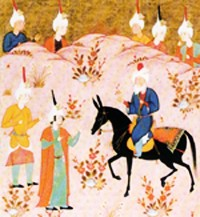
A late 16th century Persian miniature, Safavid period, representing Ibn 'Arabi on horseback with two students.

Wahdat ul-wujud (the Unity of All Things) is a concept sometimes described as pantheism or panentheism. It is primarily associated with the Asharite Sufi scholar Ibn Arabi. Some Sufi Orders, notably the Bektashis and the Universal Sufi movement, adhere to similar panentheistic beliefs. The same is said about the Nizari Ismaili who follow panentheism according to Ismaili doctrine.

=== In Pre-Columbian America ===
The Mesoamerican empires of the Mayas, Aztecs as well as the South American Incas (Tawantinsuyu) have typically been characterized as polytheistic, with strong male and female deities. According to Charles C. Mann's history book 1491: New Revelations of the Americas Before Columbus, only the lower classes of Aztec society were polytheistic. Philosopher James Maffie has argued that Aztec metaphysics was panentheistic rather than pantheistic since Teotl was considered by Aztec philosophers to be the ultimate all-encompassing yet all-transcending force defined by its inherited duality.

Native American beliefs in North America have been characterized as panentheistic in that there is an emphasis on a single, unified divine spirit that is manifest in each individual entity. (North American Native writers have also translated the word for God as the Great Mystery or as the Sacred Other). This concept is referred to by many as the Great Spirit. Philosopher J. Baird Callicott has described Lakota theology as panentheistic, in that the divine both transcends and is immanent in everything.

One exception can be modern Cherokee, who are predominantly monotheistic but apparently not panentheistic. Yet in older Cherokee traditions, many observe both pantheism and panentheism and are often not beholden to exclusivity, encompassing other spiritual traditions without contradiction, a common trait among some tribes in the Americas. In the stories of Keetoowah storytellers Sequoyah Guess and Dennis Sixkiller, God is known as ᎤᏁᎳᏅᎯ, commonly pronounced "unehlanv," and visited earth in prehistoric times, but then left earth and her people to rely on themselves. This shows a parallel to Vaishnava cosmology.

=== Konkōkyō ===
Konkokyo is a form of sectarian Japanese Shinto and a faith within the Shinbutsu-shūgō tradition. Traditional Shintoism holds that an impersonal spirit manifests/penetrates the material world, giving all objects consciousness and spontaneously creating a system of natural mechanisms, forces, and phenomena (Musubi). Konkokyo deviates from traditional Shintoism by holding that this spirit (Comparable to Brahman) has a personal identity and mind. This personal form is non-different from the energy itself, not residing in any particular cosmological location. In Konkokyo, this god is named "Tenchi Kane no Kami-Sama," which can be translated directly as "Spirit of the gilded/golden heavens and earth."

Though practitioners of Konkokyo are small in number (~300,000 globally), the sect has birthed or influenced a multiplicity of Japanese New Religions, such as Oomoto. Many of these faiths carry on the Panentheistic views of Konkokyo.

== See also ==
- Achintya Bheda Abheda, concept of qualified non-duality in Gaudiya Vaishnava Hinduism
- Brahman
- Christian Universalism
- Conceptions of God
- Creation Spirituality
- Divine simplicity
- Double-aspect theory
- Essence–energies distinction
- German idealism
- Henosis
- Kabbalah
- Neoplatonism
- Neutral monism
- Open theism
- The Over-Soul (1841), essay by Ralph Waldo Emerson
- Orthodox Christian theology
- Pantheism
- Pandeism
- Parabrahman
- Paramatman
- Philosophy of space and time
- Process theology
- Subud, spiritual movement founded by Muhammad Subuh Sumohadiwidjojo (1901–1987)
- Tawhid, concept of indivisible oneness in Islam

=== People associated with panentheism ===
- Baal Shem Tov (1698-1760), Ukrainian rabbi, philosopher and shaman. Founder of Hasidism.
- Gregory Palamas (1296–1359), Byzantine Orthodox theologian and hesychast
- Baruch Spinoza (1632–1677), Dutch philosopher of Sephardi-Portuguese origin
- Alfred North Whitehead (1861–1947), English mathematician, philosopher, and father of process philosophy
- Charles Hartshorne (1897–2000), American philosopher and father of process theology
- Arthur Peacocke (1924–2006), British Anglican theologian and biochemist
- John B. Cobb (1925–2024), American theologian and philosopher
- Sallie McFague (1933–2019), American feminist theologian, author of Models of God and The Body of God
- William Luther Pierce (1933–2002), American political activist and self-proclaimed cosmotheist
- Rosemary Radford Ruether (1936–2022), American feminist theologian, author of Sexism and God-Talk and Gaia and God
- Jan Assmann (1938–2024), German Egyptologist, theorist of Cosmotheism
- Leonardo Boff (b. 1938), Brazilian liberation theologian and philosopher, former Franciscan priest, author of Ecology and Liberation: A New Paradigm
- Matthew Fox (priest) (b. 1940), American theologian, exponent of Creation Spirituality, expelled from the Dominican Order in 1993 and received into the Episcopal priesthood in 1994, author of Creation Spirituality, The Coming of the Cosmic Christ and A New Reformation: Creation Spirituality and the Transformation of Christianity
- Marcus Borg (1942–2015), American New Testament scholar and theologian, prominent member of the Jesus Seminar, author of The God We Never Knew
- Richard Rohr (b. 1943), American Franciscan priest and spiritual writer, author of Everything Belongs and The Universal Christ
- Carter Heyward (b. 1945), American feminist theologian and Episcopal priest, author of Touching our Strength and Saving Jesus from Those Who Are Right
- Norman Lowell (b. 1946), Maltese writer and politician, self-proclaimed cosmotheist
- John Polkinghorne (1930–2021), English theoretical physicist and theologian
- Michel Weber (b. 1963), Belgian philosopher
- Thomas Jay Oord (b. 1965), American theologian and philosopher

== General and cited references ==
- Ankur Barua, "God’s Body at Work: Rāmānuja and Panentheism," in: International Journal of Hindu Studies, 14.1 (2010), pp. 1–30.
- Philip Clayton and Arthur Peacock (eds.), In Whom We Live and Move and Have Our Being; Panentheistic Reflections on God's Presence in a Scientific World, Eerdmans (2004)
- Bangert, B.C. (2006). Consenting to God and nature: Toward a theocentric, naturalistic, theological ethics, Princeton theological monograph ser. 55, Pickwick Publications, Eugene.
- Cooper, John W. (2006). Panentheism: The Other God of the Philosophers, Baker Academic ISBN 9780801027246
- Davis, Andrew M. and Philip Clayton (eds.) (2018). How I Found God in Everyone and Everywhere, Monkfish Book Publishing ISBN 9781939681881
- Thomas Jay Oord (2010). The Nature of Love: A Theology ISBN 978-0-8272-0828-5.
- Joseph Bracken, "Panentheism in the context of the theology and science dialogue", in: Open Theology, 1 (2014), 1–11 (online).
- Marbaniang, Domenic (2011). Epistemics of Divine Reality. POD. ISBN 9781105160776.
- Hiršs, Andris (2024). Influence of personalism on Latvian theory up to the early twentieth century: substantiality and panentheism. Studies in East European Thought. https://doi.org/10.1007/s11212-024-09678-7 Text:https://rdcu.be/dXVTG
