= George William Meadley =

English merchant and biographer

George William Meadley (1774–1818) was an English merchant, known as a biographer.

== Life ==
Meadley was born at Sunderland, County Durham, on 1 January 1774, an only son; his father died in 1775, and his mother soon afterwards moved with her five children to the adjoining town of Bishop Wearmouth. In 1783 he was placed at the grammar school of Witton-le-Wear, under John Farrer. At the end of 1788 he was apprenticed to Thomas Chipchase, a banker and general dealer at Durham, where Meadley became a liberal in politics. Leaving Durham in 1793 he lived at home, learning Italian, improving his French, and founding a subscription library at Sunderland (1795) with the help of Ferrer, by then rector of Sunderland. In March 1795 he made the acquaintance of William Paley, the rector of Bishop Wearmouth.

During 1796 Meadley was on a business voyage to the Levant. He stayed at Naples, Smyrna and Constantinople, and collected a library of books. This was during the French Revolutionary Wars, and he fell into the hands of the French on his return voyage, spending some time as a prisoner in Spain. Learning German, he went on further mercantile voyages to Danzig (1801) and to Hamburg (1803), travelling further on foot with a friend through northern Germany. Retiring then from trade, he began to write.

In 1818 Meadley returned from researching in London and the south of England in poor health. He died unmarried at Bishop Wearmouth, on 28 November 1818, and was buried in the churchyard of Holy Trinity, Sunderland. He was considered somewhat fanatical in his liberal views, and when a marble tablet to his memory was placed in the Sunderland Subscription Library, and an attempt in 1819 to have this tablet removed, on the grounds of his religious stance, leading to an angry local controversy.

== Works ==
Meadley is best known as the biographer of William Paley, who died in 1805. Several years later he began to collect materials, applying, among others, to John Disney, who introduced him to Thomas Jervis; as a by-product he became a Unitarian. The first edition of his Memoirs of Paley was entirely rewritten before publication, on the advice of a friend who disliked its florid style. It appear as Memoirs of William Paley, Sunderland, 1809. When bringing out a second and amended edition (1810) he spent the winter in Edinburgh to see it through the press, and attended the moral philosophy lectures of Thomas Brown.

Meadley published also:

- A Sketch of … Proposals for … Reform in Parliament, 1812, reprinted by Jeremy Bentham in his Plan of Parliamentary Reform, 1817.
- Memoirs of Algernon Sydney, 1813.
- A Letter to the Bishop of St. David's … by a Lay Seceder, 1814; addressed to Thomas Burgess.
- A Second Letter to the Bishop of St. David's. By a Lay Seceder, 1816.

To the Monthly Repository he contributed lives of Ann Jebb, Robert Clark the Sunderland surgeon, and Robert Waugh, vicar of Bishop Middleham; also some verse, "The Little Chimney Sweeper" (1818).

== Notes ==
Attribution

This article incorporates text from a publication now in the public domain: Lee, Sidney, ed. (1894). "Meadley, George Wilson". Dictionary of National Biography. Vol. 37. London: Smith, Elder & Co.
