= John Disney (antiquarian) =

English barrister and antiquarian (1779–1857)

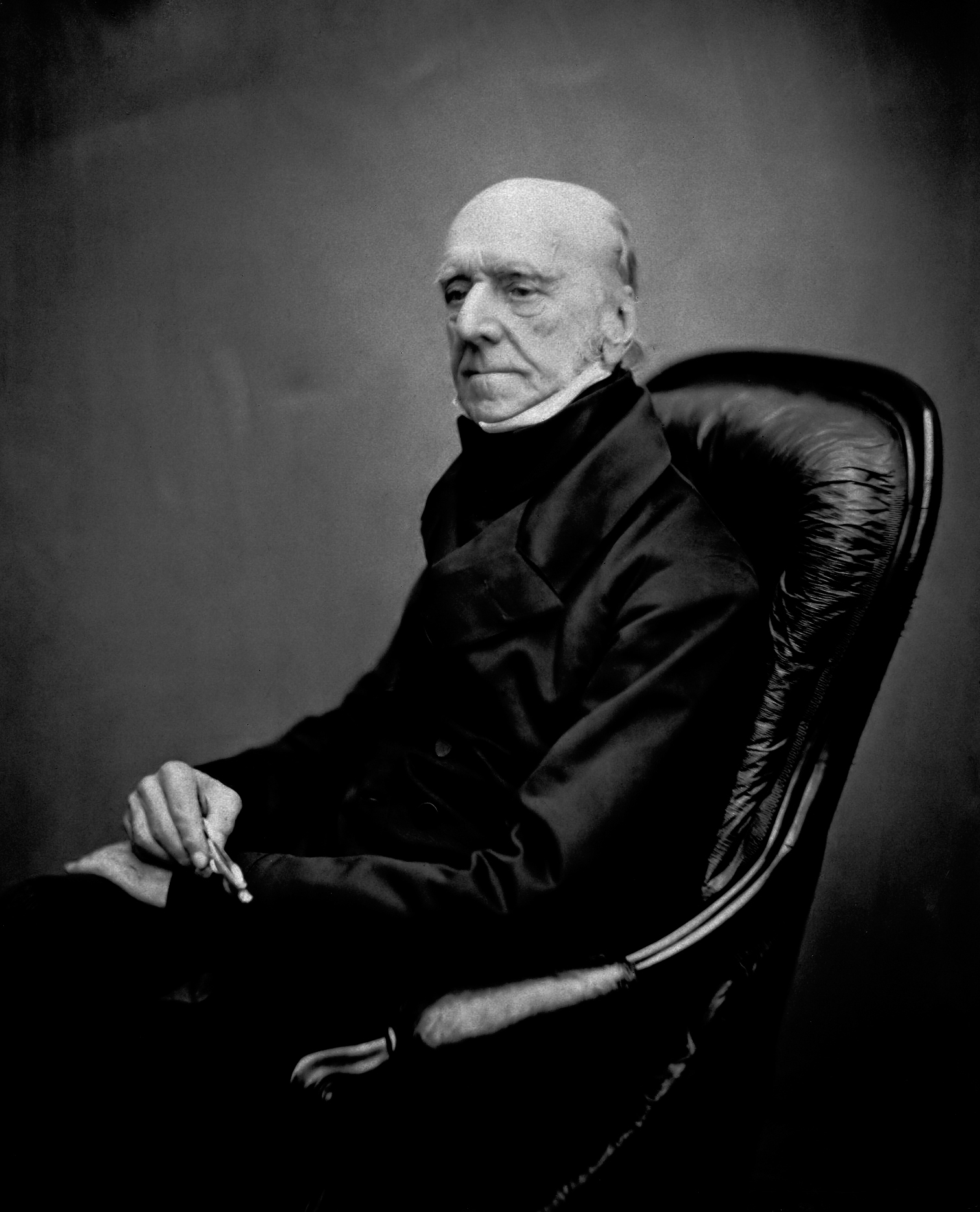
John Disney (Maull & Polyblank)

John Disney (29 May 1779 – 6 May 1857) was an English barrister and antiquarian. He was elected Fellow of the Royal Society in 1832 and Fellow of the Society of Antiquaries in 1839.

== Life ==
Born at Flintham Hall in Nottinghamshire, he was the eldest son of John Disney and his wife Jane Blackburne, daughter of Francis Blackburne and his wife. His father was a former Anglican clergyman who became one of the founders of the Episcopal Unitarian Church. He was from a long line of English Dissenters going back to Disney's great-great grandfather John Disney and earlier.

Disney was educated at home in London until the age of 16, when he went to Peterhouse, Cambridge. In 1798, he was admitted to the Inner Temple; he was called to the bar in 1803. He was appointed in 1807 Recorder of Bridport, Dorset, and went to live at Corscombe.

On his father's death in 1816, Disney came into a substantial inheritance. It included a house, The Hyde, near Ingatestone in Essex, and land. There were libraries that had belonged to his father, Thomas Hollis, and Thomas Brand Hollis: these were sold. There was also a collection of antiquities including significant classical sculptures, that came from Hollis, Brand Hollis and Richard Mead, as well as other sources.

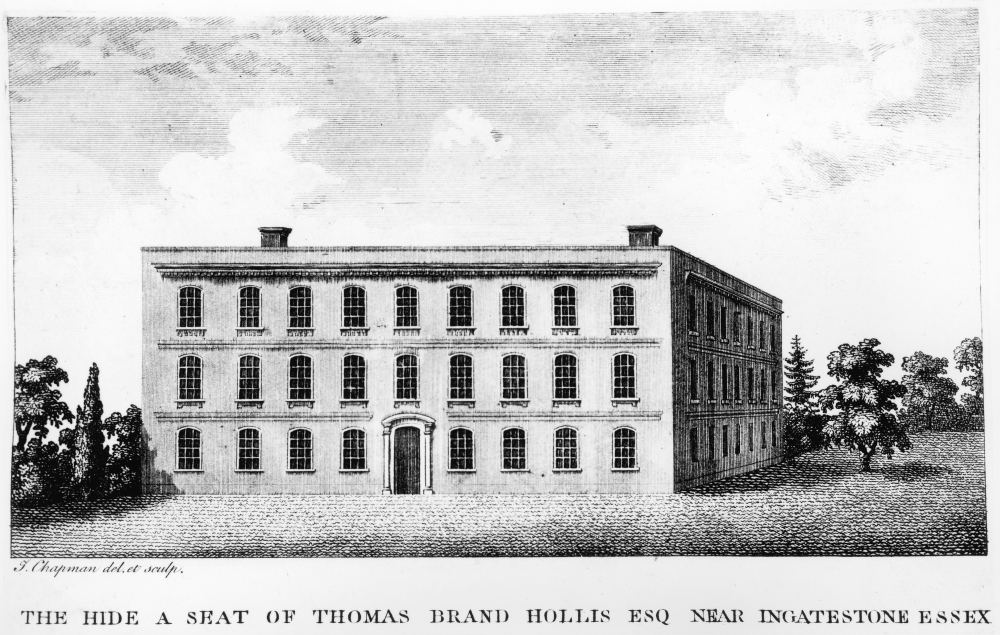
The Hyde, Essex residence of John Disney, late 18th-century engraving

Disney was High Sheriff of Dorset in 1818. His wife inherited from her father in 1822. Disney left the post of Recorder at Bridport in 1823, and at some later point afterwards moved to Essex. He stood unsuccessfully as a political candidate in Harwich and North Essex.

== Collector ==
The collection at The Hyde was built up by Disney, in particular when he visited Rome in 1826–7. It was further enlarged by gifts from Charles Callis Western and James Christie. The value of the collection has been debated, with Adolf Michaelis in the 19th century finding fault with the quality ("trash rather than treasure"), and Disney's expertise in the area. It is now known that it included modern artefacts. The issue was studied again in 2012 by Caroline Vout ("Treasure, not trash").

== Works ==
Disney wrote on politics and the law:

- A collection of acts of parliament, relative to county and borough elections (1811)
- Outlines of a Penal Code (1826).

Building on a catalogue of the antiquarian collection made by his father, and supplemented by James Tate, Disney published in 1846 as Museum Disneianum. It included input from Taylor Combe, John Flaxman and Richard Westmacott. There was a second edition in 1848, and supplements; and a later edition under the title Fitzwilliam Museum.

== Legacy ==
Disney presented most of the sculptures in his collection to the Fitzwilliam Museum, Cambridge in 1850. In 1851 he endowed with £1,000 the Disney Professorship of Archaeology at the University of Cambridge. The first holder was John Howard Marsden, nominated by Disney. In 1857 an additional £3,500 left by Disney went to support the Professorship.

What remained of the collection at The Hyde was sold by Christie's auction house in the years after Edgar Disney, the heir, died in 1881. The Fitzwilliam Museum acquired some of the pieces.

== Family ==
Disney married his paternal first cousin Sophia Disney-Ffytche, daughter of Lewis Disney Fytche, in 1802. They had three children, two sons John and Edgar, and a daughter Sophia. John died young. Edgar Disney married Barbara, daughter of Lewis William Brouncker in 1834, and Sophia married William Jesse of the 17th Regiment in 1836.
