= Daniel Disney =

English non-conformist landowner

Daniel Disney (1656–1734) of Swinderby, Lincolnshire, was an 18th-century English non-conformist landowner.

== Life ==
Disney married 1674 Catherine Fynes (died 1690), younger daughter and co-heiress of Henry Fynes (1611–1670), whose father Sir Henry Fynes rebuilt Kirkstead Abbey as a country house in the 17th century. Thus the Disneys inherited the lordship of the manor of Kirkstead, Lincolnshire.

The father of Revd John Disney, great-grandfather of Revd Dr John Disney and great-great-grandfather of John Disney, High Sheriff of Dorset and former Recorder of Bridport, he founded a dissenting chapel and in 1720 he set up a trust to provide for continued dissenting worship in the manor after his death.

== See also ==
- Kirkstead Abbey
