= Thomas Jervis =

Thomas Jervis may refer to:

- Thomas Jervis (judge)
- Thomas Jervis (minister)
- Tom Jervis, Australian basketball player
