= Camillo Paderni =

18th-century Italian artist

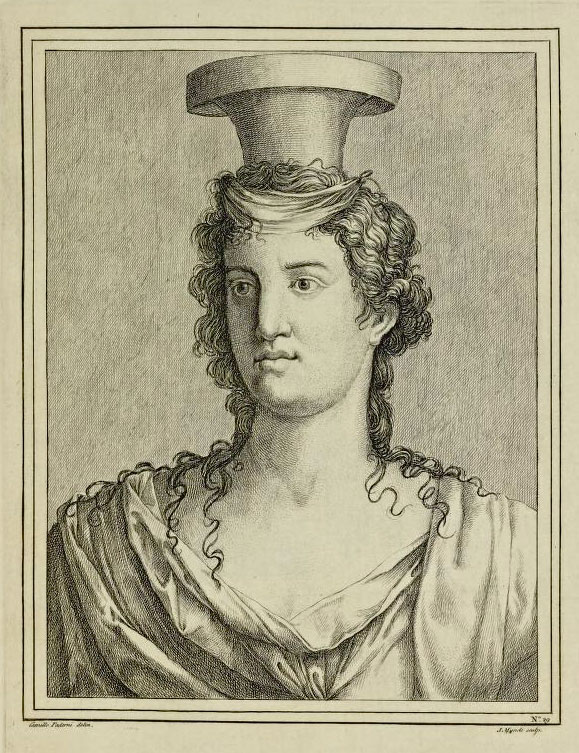
Sketch by Paderni, c 1740

Camillo Paderni, or Camillus Paderni, (c. 1715 to 1781) was a Roman artist, employed by King Charles VII of Naples as an illustrator, excavator, and curator at the Museum Herculanense in the royal Palace of Portici.

== Papyri ==
Paderni was possibly the first person who undertook the task of transcribing the Herculaneum papyri, obtained at the Villa of the Papyri in Herculaneum. Paderni used the method of slicing scrolls in half, copying readable text, by removing papyri layers. This transcription procedure was used for hundreds of scrolls, and in the process destroyed them.

== Correspondence ==
In a letter from 1752 to Richard Mead, Paderni wrote:

It is not a month ago, that there have been found many volumes of papyrus, but turn'd to a sort of charcoal, so brittle, that, being touched, it falls readily into ashes. Nevertheless, by his majestys orders, I have made many trials to open them, but all to no purpose; excepting some words §, which I have picked out intire, where there are divers bits by which it appears in what manner the whole was written. The form of the characters, made with a very black tincture, that overcomes the darkness of the charcoal, I shall here, to oblige you, imitate in two short lines (see reference) [..] my fidelity to the king not permitting me to send you any more.

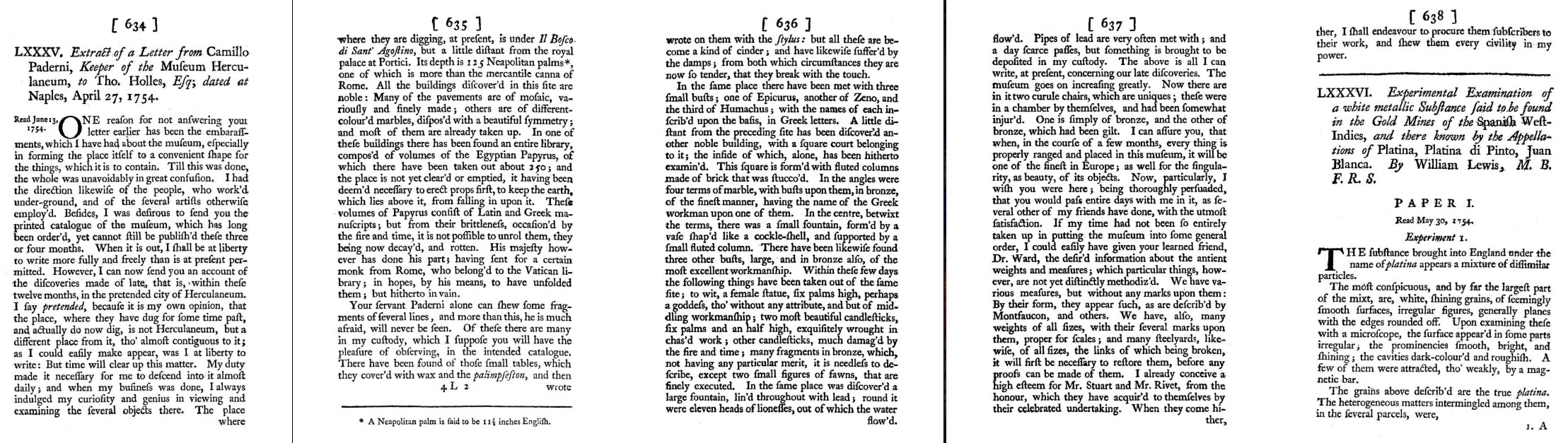
Extract of a Letter from Camillo Paderni, Keeper of the Museum Herculaneum, possibly to Thomas Hollis

In 1754 Paderni wrote a letter to Thomas Hollis, briefly describing the discoveries at the Villa of the Papyri:

In one of these buildings there has been found an entire library composed of volumes of the Egyptian Papyrus, of which there have been taken out about 250; and the place is not yet clear'd or emptied, it having been deem'd necessary to erect props first, to keep the earth, which lies above it, from falling in upon it. These volumes of Papyrus consist of Latin and Greek manuscripts but from their brittleness, occasion'd by the fire and time, it is not possible to unroll them, they being now decayed, and rotten. His majesty however has done his parts having sent for a certain monk from Rome [Abbot Piaggio], who belonged to the Vatican library, in hopes, by his means, to have unfolded them; but hitherto in vain.

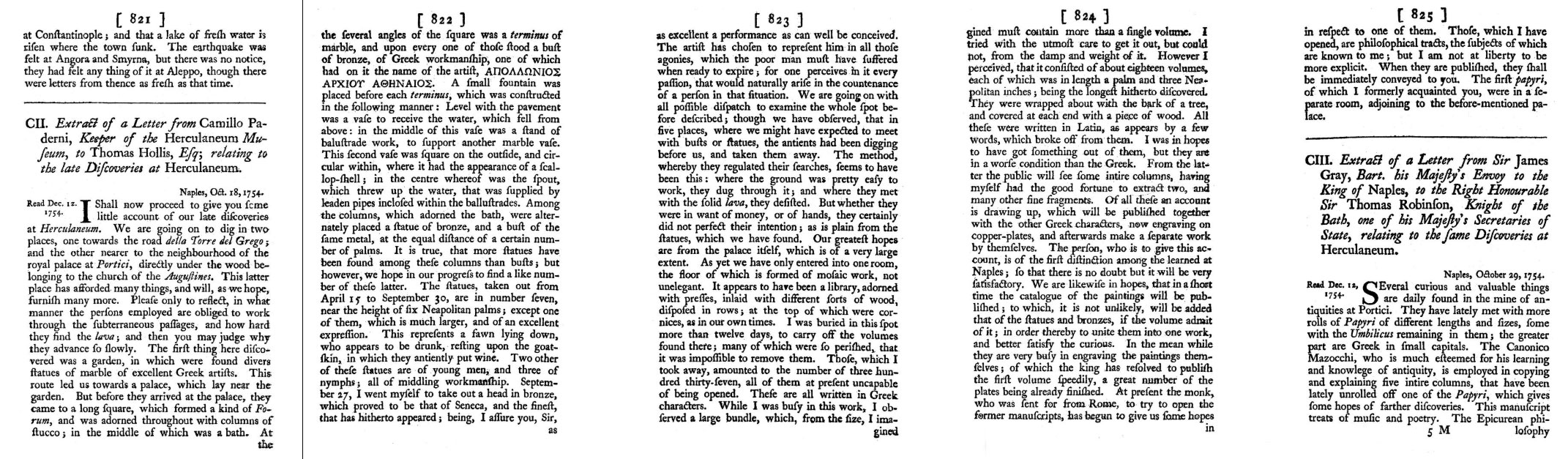
Letter from Camillo Paderni to Thomas Hollis, Esq; Relating to the Late Discoveries at Herculaneum

The Getty Villa architecture was inspired by the Villa of the Papyri.

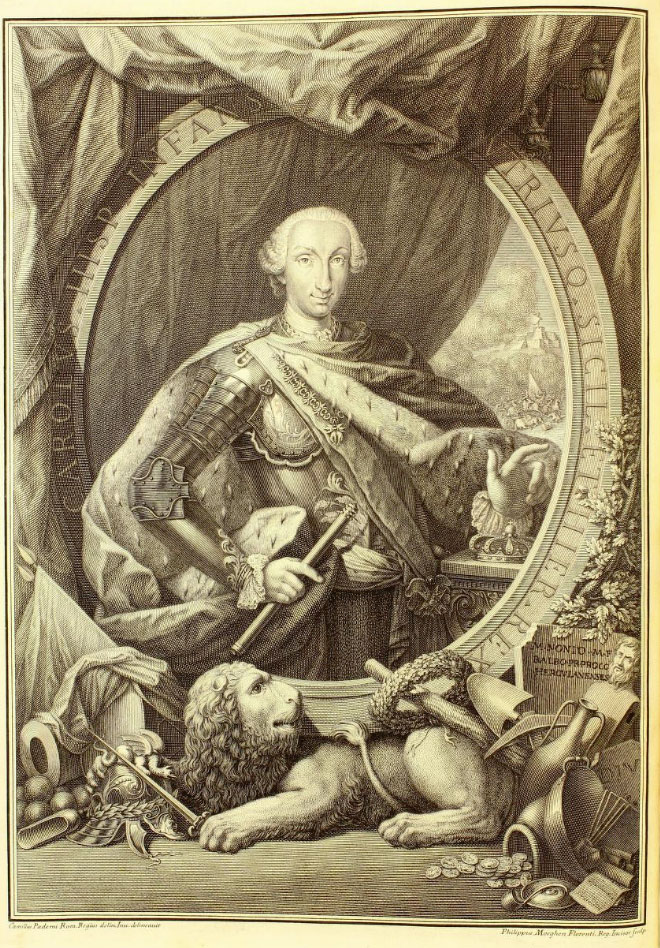
King Charles VII of Naples (Charles III of Spain) by Paderni, ca 1757

In another letter from 1754, to Hollis, Paderni wrote:

I shall now proceed to give you some little account of our late discoveries at Herculaneum. We are going on to dig in two places, one towards the road della Torre del Greco; and the other nearer to the neighbourhood of the royal palace at Portici, directly under the wood belonging to the church of the Augustines. [..] Please only to reflect, in which manner the persons employed are obliged to work through the subterraneous passages, and how hard they find the lava; and then you may judge why they advance so slowly. The first thing here discovered was a garden, in which were found divers statues of marble of excellent Greek artists. This route led us towards a palace, which lay near the garden. But before they arrived at the palace, they came to a long square, which formed a kind of Forum, and was adorned throughout with columns of stucco; in the middle of which was a bath.

At the several angles of the square was a terminus of marble, and upon every one of those stood a bust of bronze, of Greek workmanship, one of which had on it the name of the artist ΑΠΟΛΛΩΝΙΟΣ ΑΡΧΙΟΥ ΑΘΗΝΑΙΟΣ (see image). A small fountain was placed before each terminus which was constructed in the following manner: Level with the pavement was a vase to receive the water, which fell from above: in the middle of this vase was a stand of balustrade work, to support another marble vase. This second vase was square on the outside, and circular within, where it had the appearance of a scallop-shell; in the centre whereof was the spout, which threw up the water, that was supplied by leaden pipes inclosed within the balustrades. Among the columns, which adorned the bath, were alternately placed a statue of bronze, and a bust of the same metal, at the equal distance of a certain number of palms.

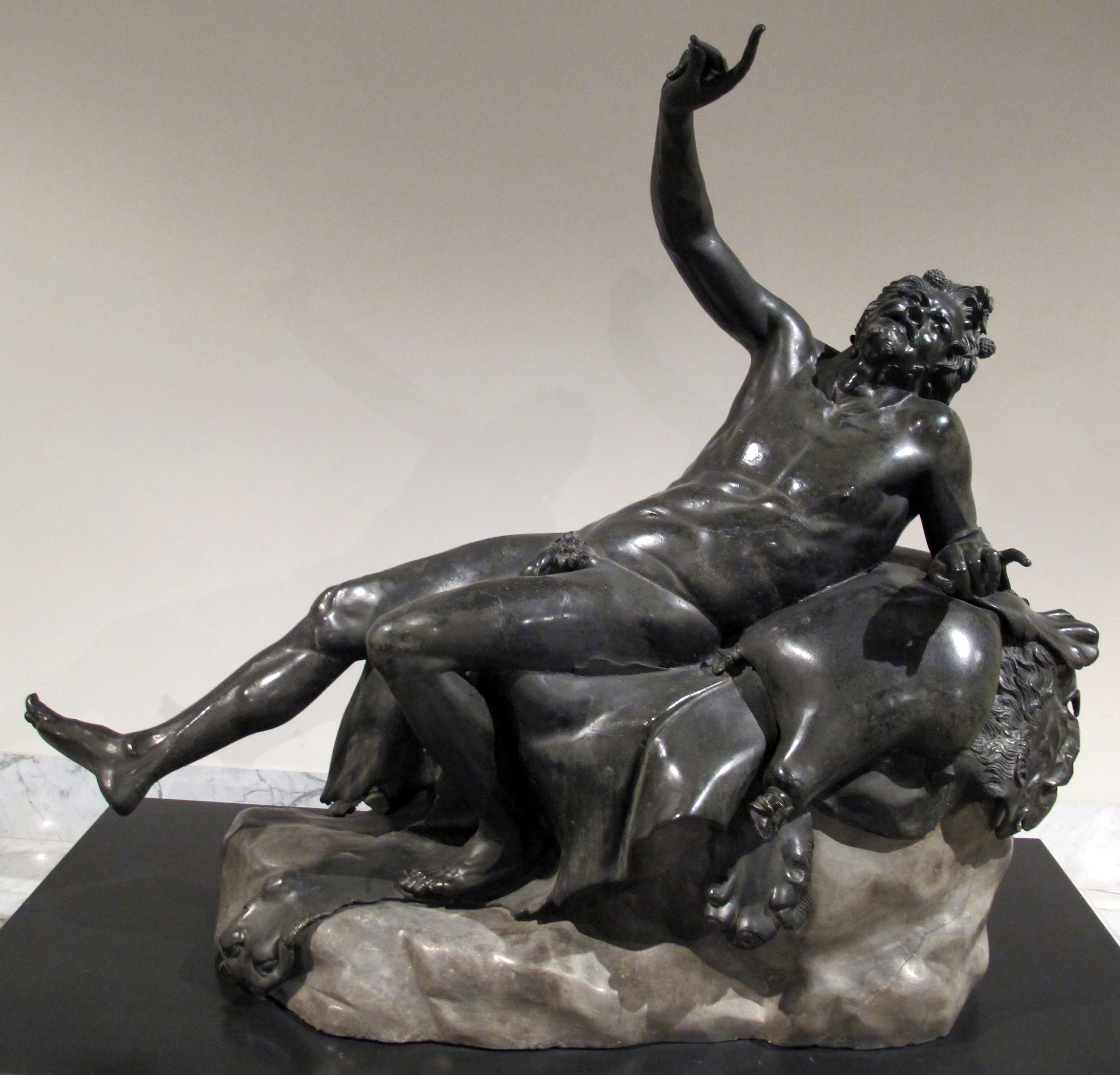
Statue of a drunken satyr from the Villa of the Papyri

It is true, that more statues have been found among these columns than busts; but however, we hope in our progress to find a like number of these latter. The statues, taken out from April 15 to September 30, are in number seven, near the height of six Neapolitan palms; except one of them, which is much larger, and of an excellent expression. This represents a fawn lying down, who appears to be drunk, resting upon the goatskin, in which they antiently put wine. Two other of these statues are of young men, and three of nymphs; all of middling workmanship. September 27, I went myself to take out a head in bronze, which proved to be that of Seneca, and the finest, that has hitherto appeared; being, I assure you, Sir, as excellent a performance as can well be conceived. The artist has chosen to represent him in all those agonies, which the poor man must have suffered when ready to expire; for one perceives in it every passion, that would naturally arise in the countenance of a person in that situation.

We are going on with all possible dispatch to examine the whole spot before described; though we have observed, that in five places, where we might have expected to meet with busts or statues, the antients had been digging before us, and taken them away. The method, whereby they regulated their searches, seems to have been this: where the ground was pretty easy to work, they dug through it and where they met with the solid lava they desisted. But whether they were in want of money, or of hands, they certainly did not perfect their intention; as is plain from the statues, which we have found. Our greatest hopes are from the palace itself, which is of a very large extent. As yet we have only entered into one room, the floor of which is formed of mosaic work, not unelegant. It appears to have been a library, adorned with presses, inlaid with different sorts of wood, disposed in rows; at the top of which were cornices, as in our own times.

I was buried in this spot more than twelve days, to carry off the volumes found there; many of which were so perished that it was impossible to remove them. Those, which I took away, amounted to the number of three hundred thirty, seven, all of them at present uncapable of being opened. These are all written in Greek characters. While I was busy in this work, I observed a large bundle, which, from the size, I imagined must contain more than a single volume. I tried with the utmost care to get it out, but could not, from the damp and weight of it. However I perceived, that it consisted of about eighteen volumes, each of which was in length a palm and three Neapolitan inches; being the longest hitherto discovered. They were wrapped about with the bark of a tree, and covered at each end with a piece of wood. All these were written in Latin, as appears by a few words, which broke off from them.

I was in hopes to have got something out of them, but they are in a worse condition than the Greek. From the latter the public will see some entire columns, having myself had the good fortune to extract two, and many other fine fragments. Of all these an account is drawing up, which will be published together with the other Greek characters, now engraving on copper-plates, and afterwards make a separate work by themselves. The person, who is to give this account, is of the first distinction among the learned at Naples; so that there is no doubt but it will be very satisfactory. We are likewise in hopes that in a short time the catalogue of the paintings will be published to which, it is not unlikely, will be added that of the statues and bronzes, if the volume admit of it; in order thereby to unite them into one work, and better satisfy the curious.

In the meanwhile they are very busy in engraving the paintings themselves; of which the king has resolved to publish the first volume speedily, a great number of the plates being already finished. At present the monk, who was sent for from Rome, to try to open the former manuscripts has begun to give us some hopes in respect to one of them. Those, which I have opened, are philosophical tracts, the subjects of which are known to me; but I am not at liberty to be more explicit. When they are published they shall be immediately conveyed to you. The first papyri, of which I formerly acquainted you, were in a separate room, adjoining to the before mentioned palace.

In 1755, Paderni wrote two more letters to Thomas Hollis, briefing him on the excavation and scroll transcription progress. The following year he wrote him again, mentioning two works from Philodemus, on rhetoric and music.

== Drawings ==
Sketches by Paderni based on other paintings, as part of George Turnbull's ca 1740 book, A treatise on ancient painting.

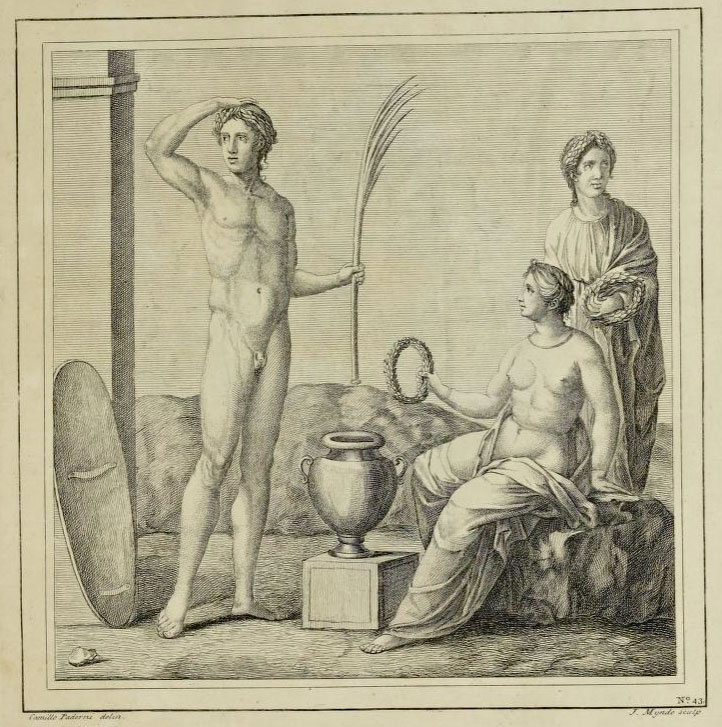

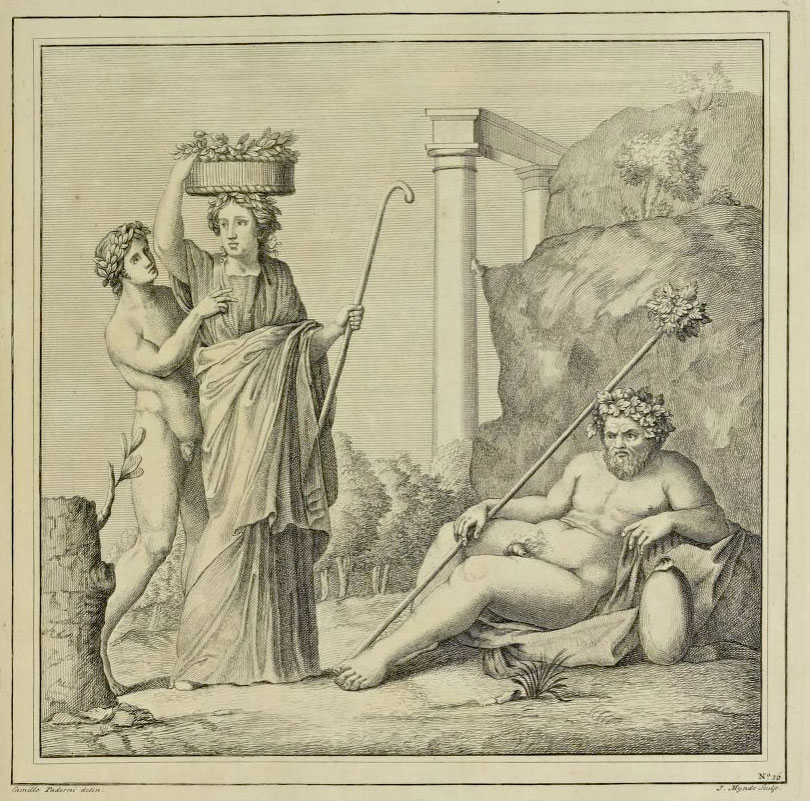

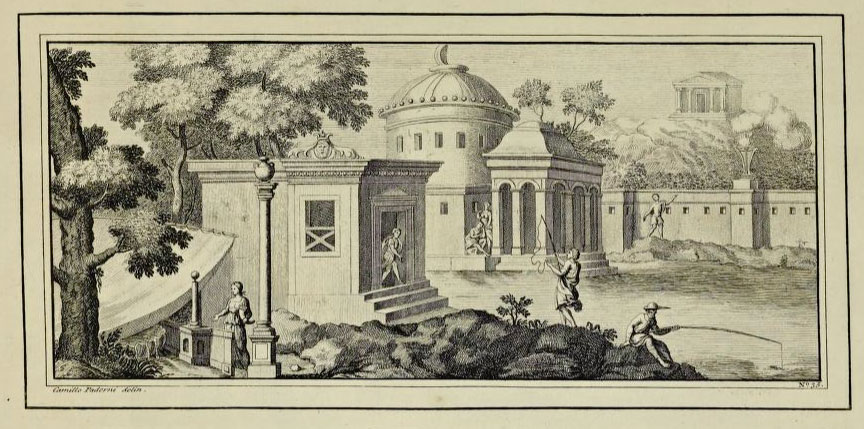

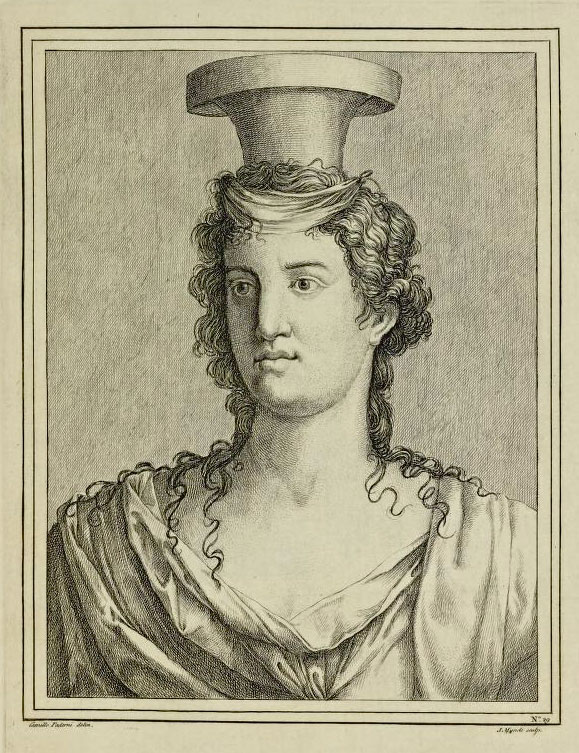

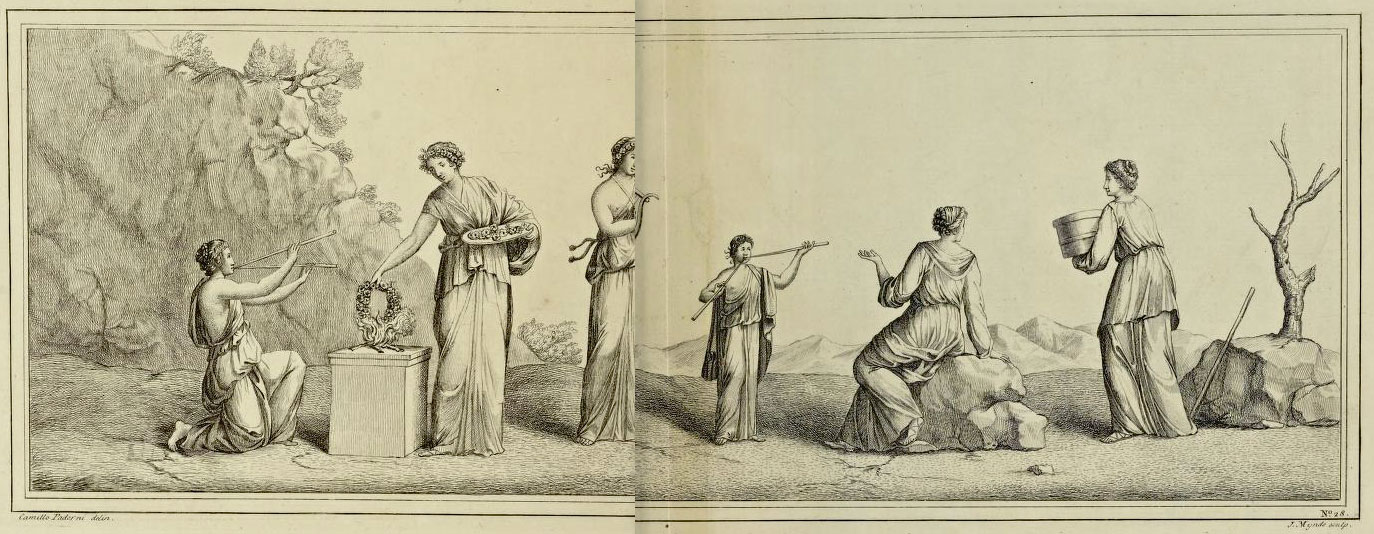

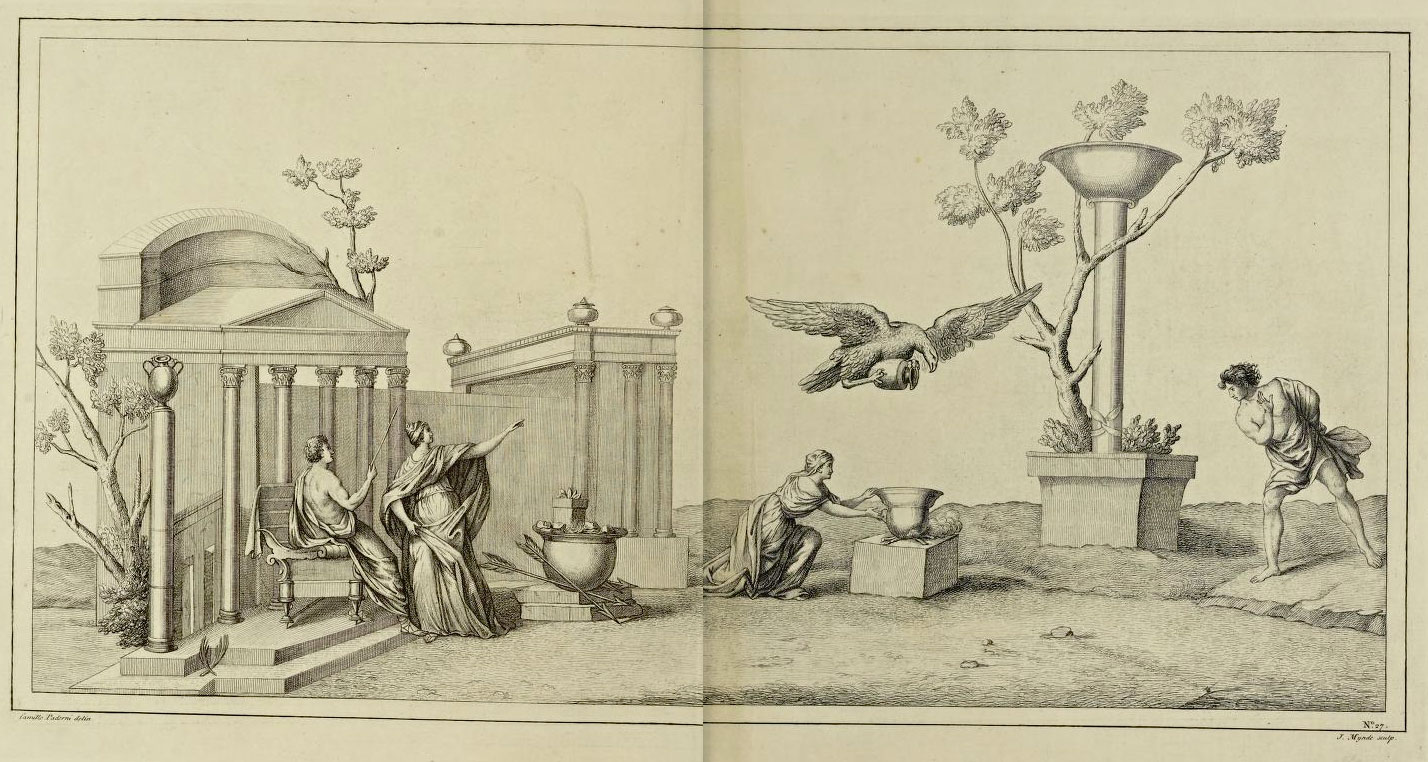

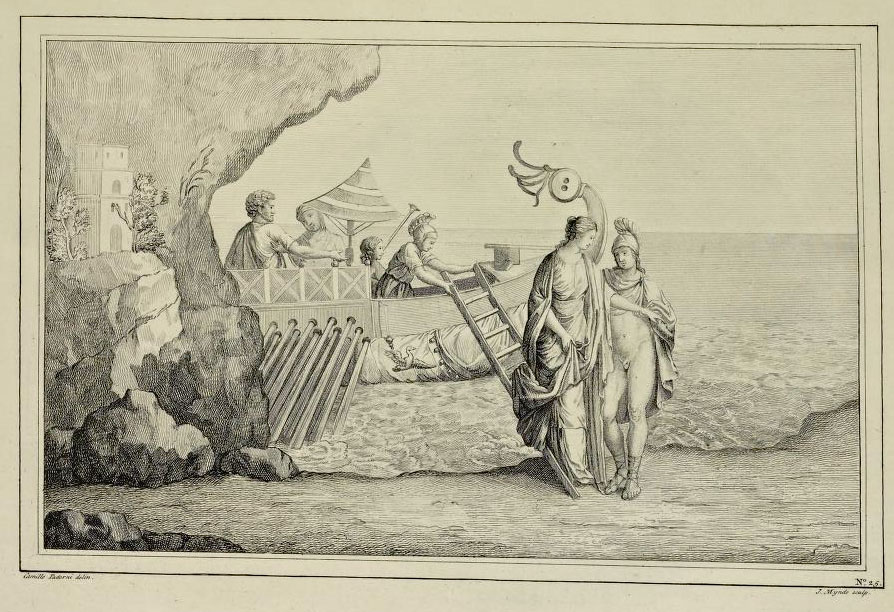

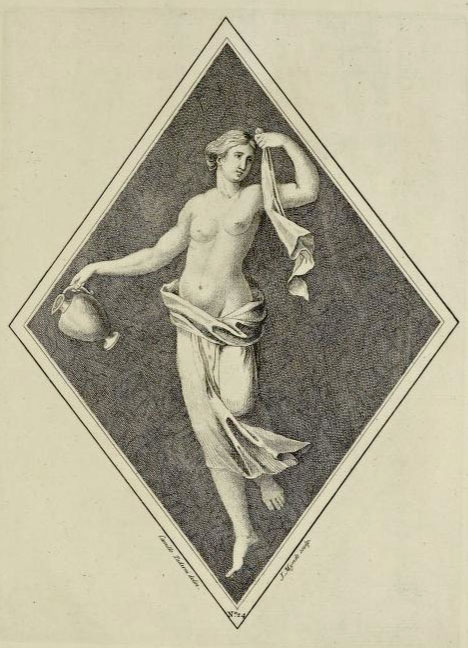

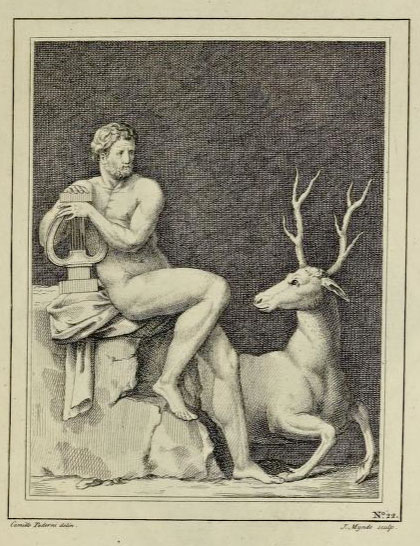

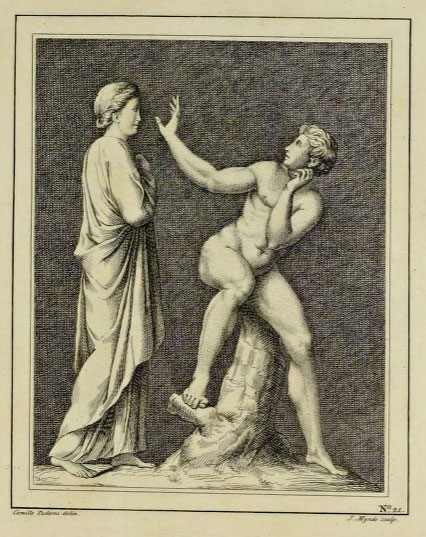

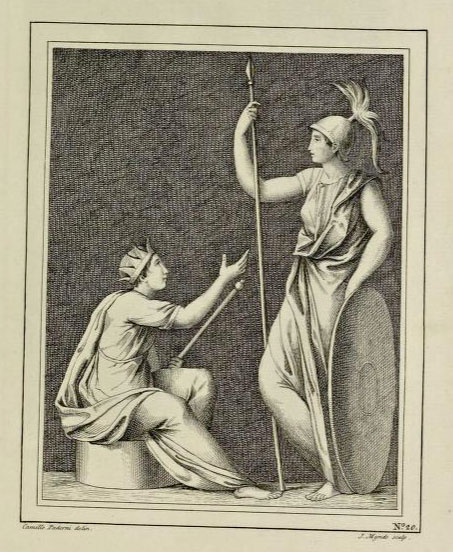

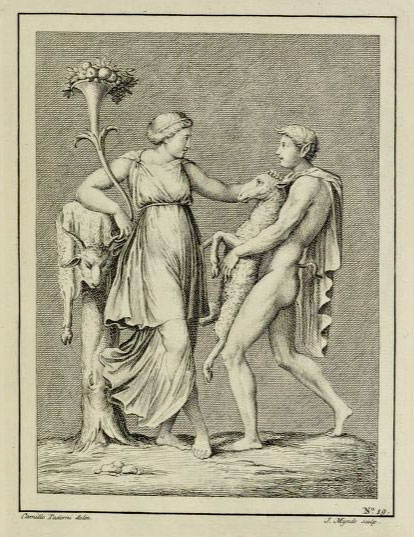

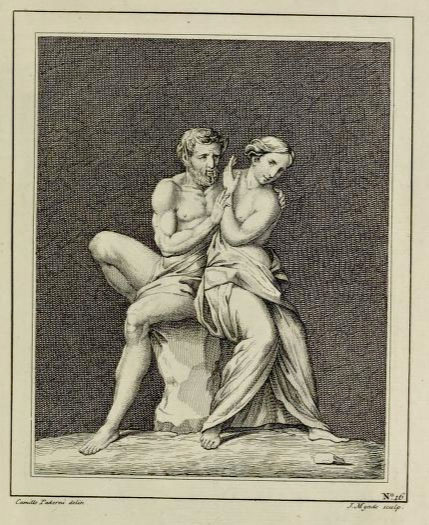

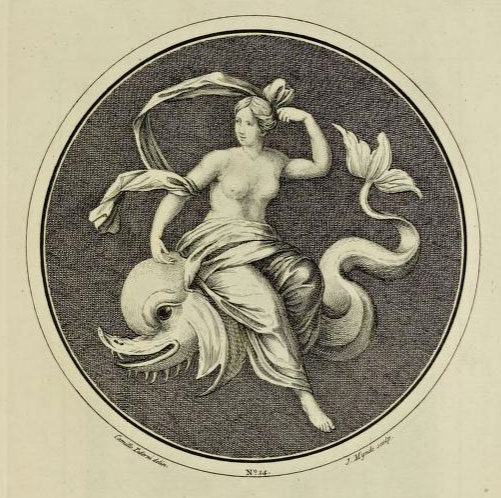

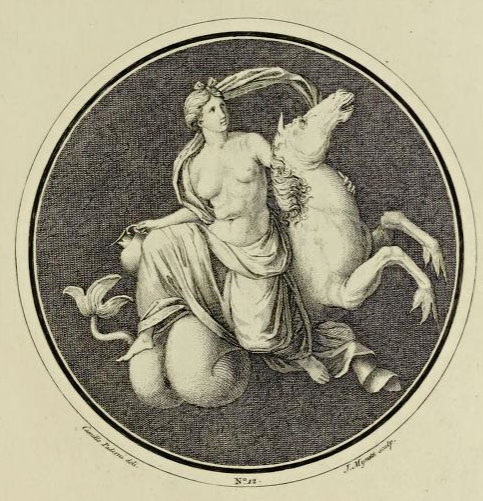

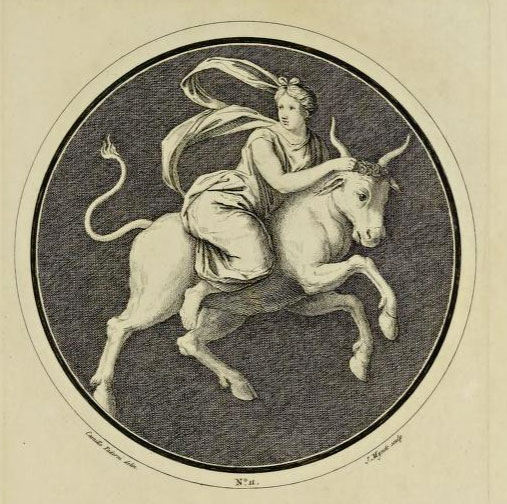

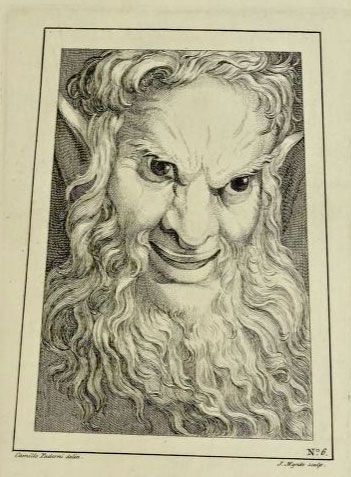

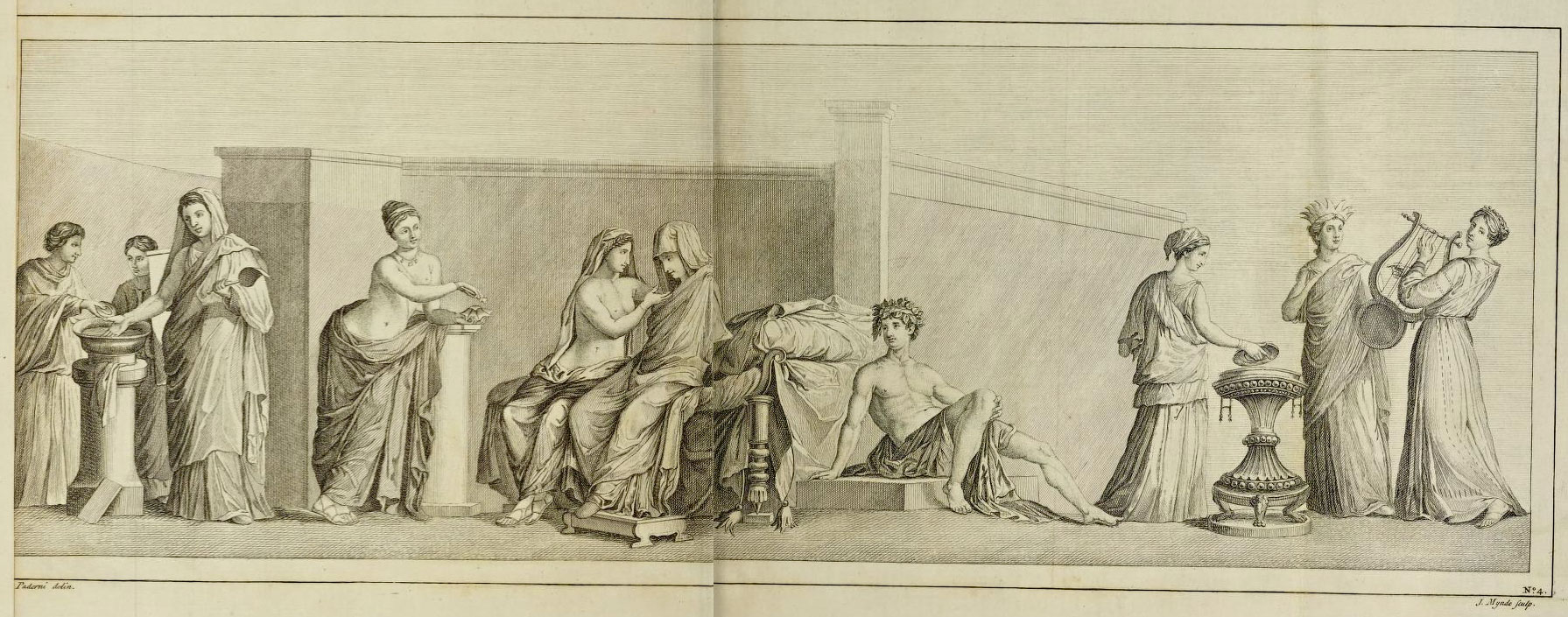

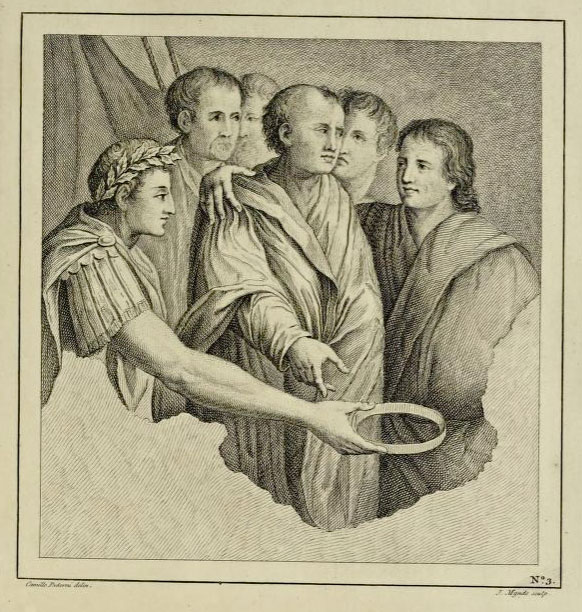

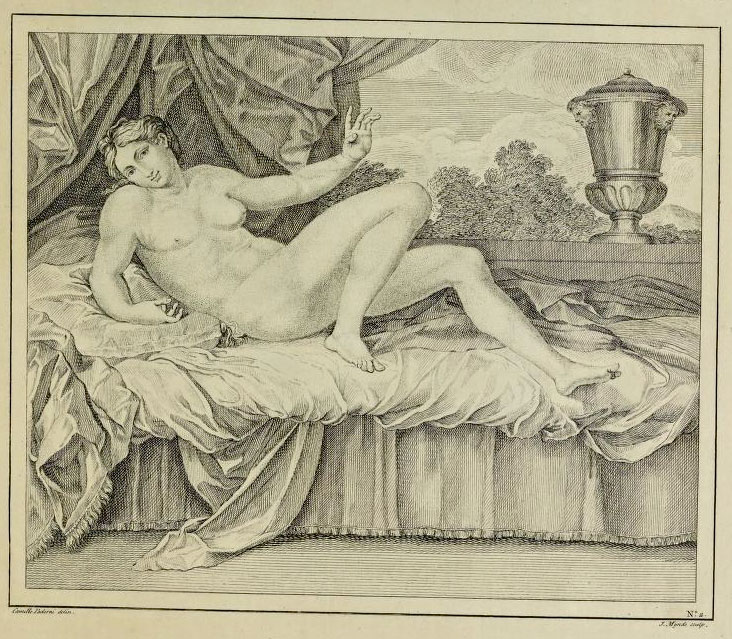

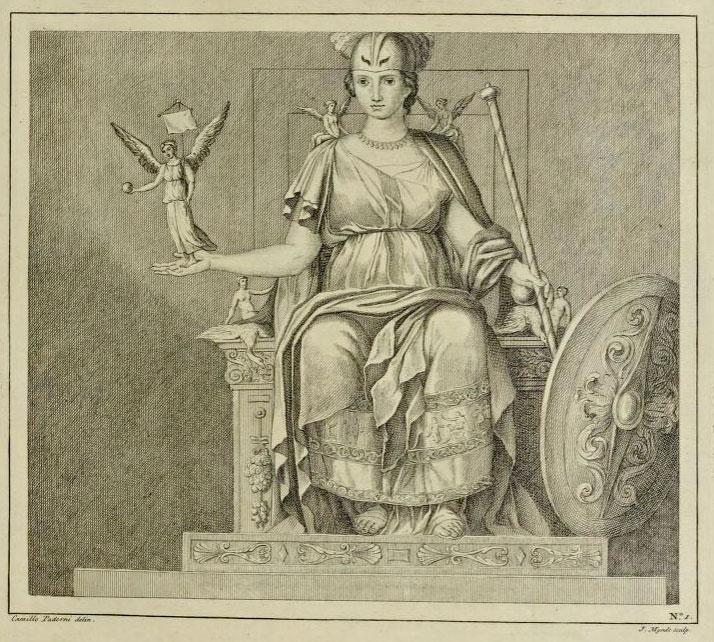

Paderni drawings from a 1757 publication by Ottavio Antonio Bayardi.

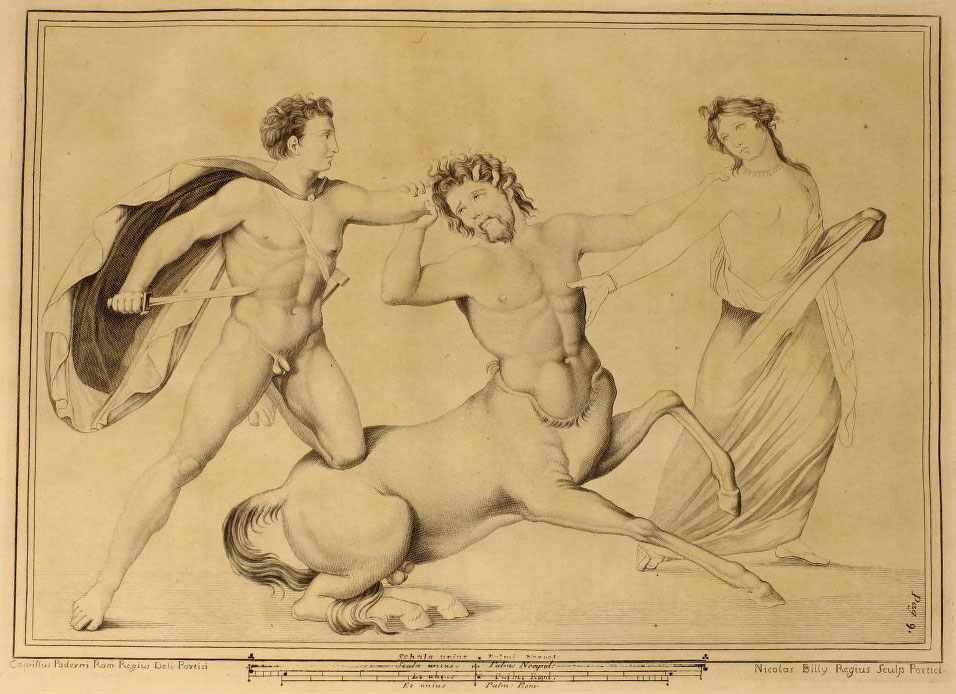

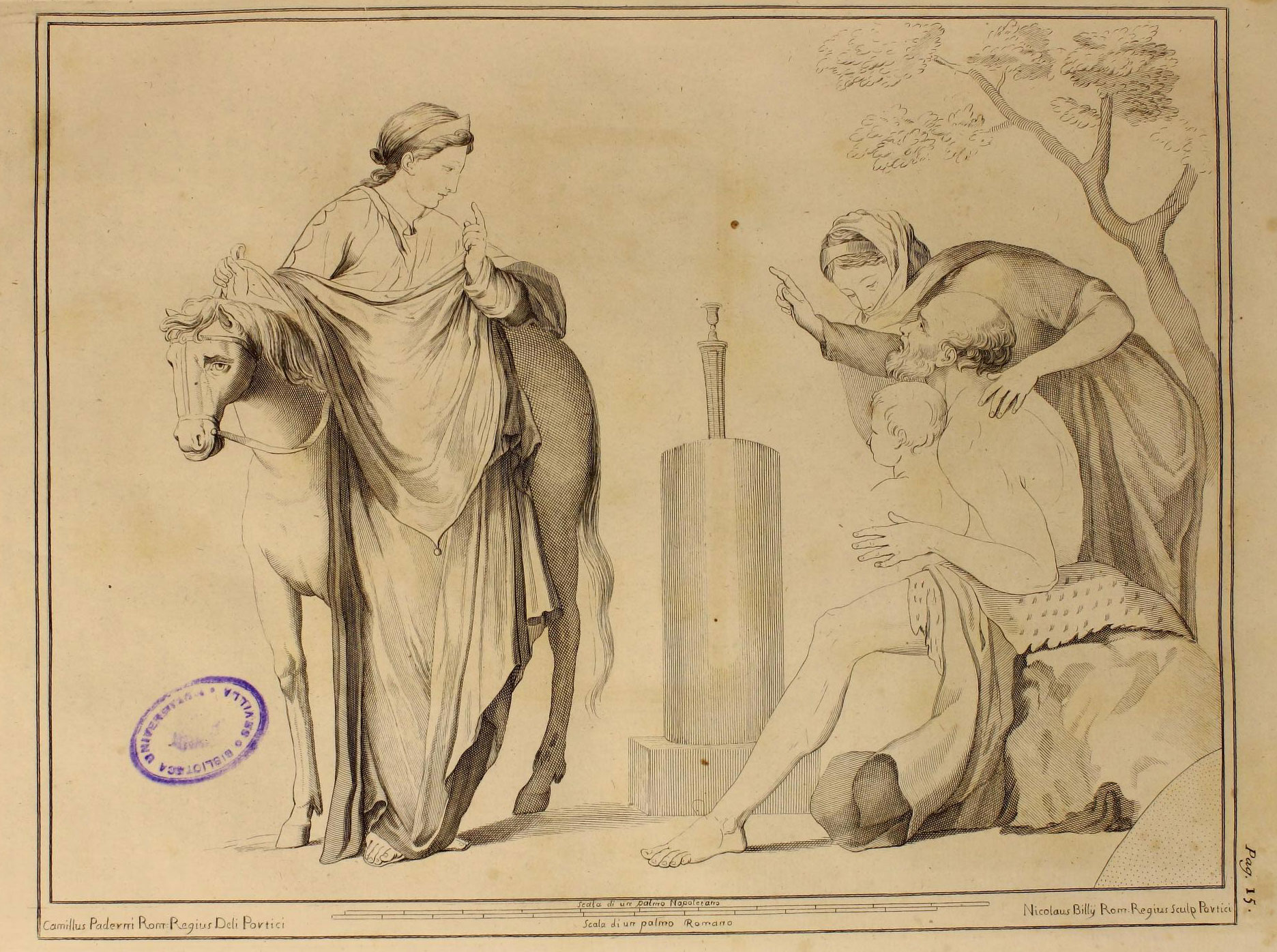

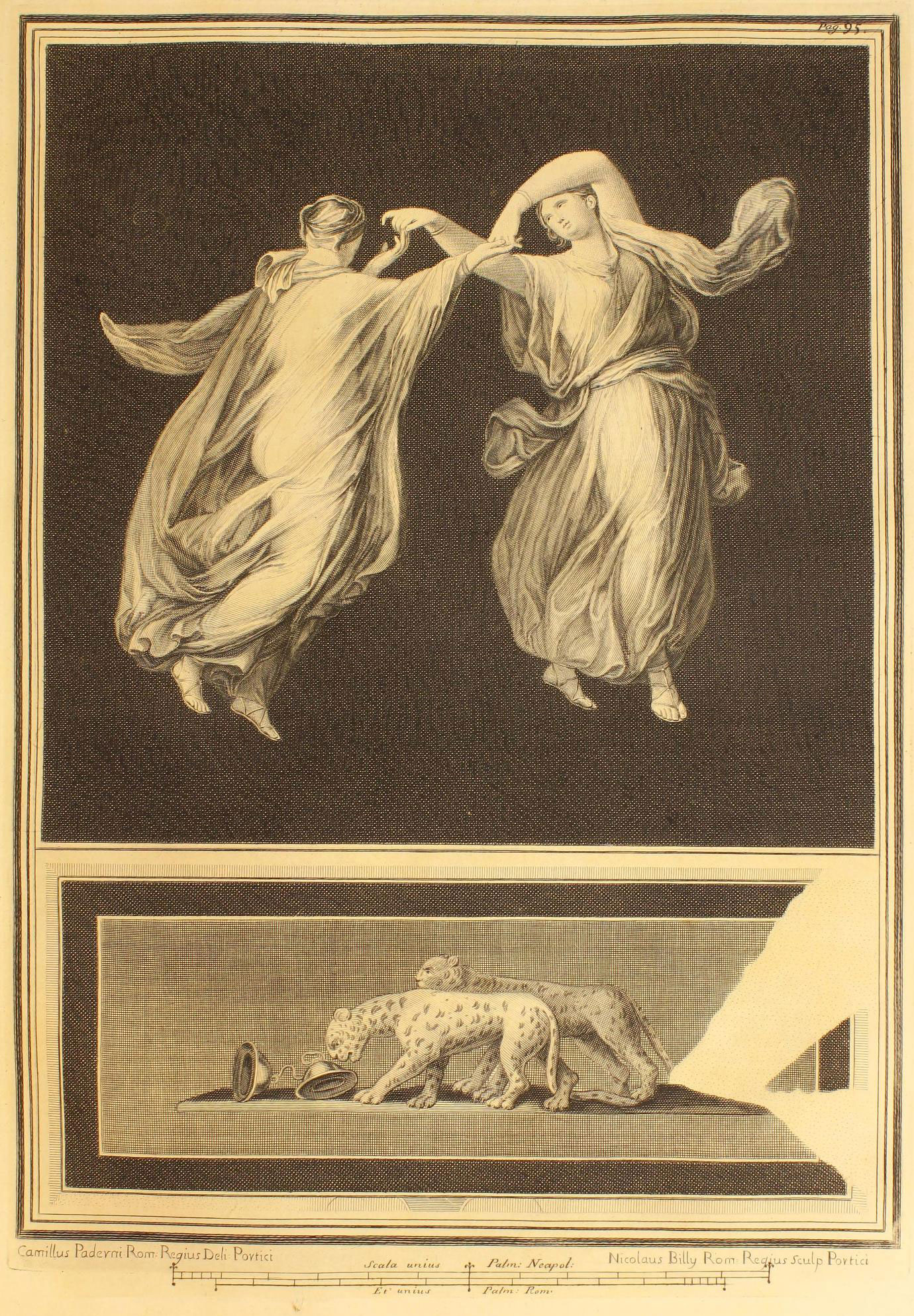

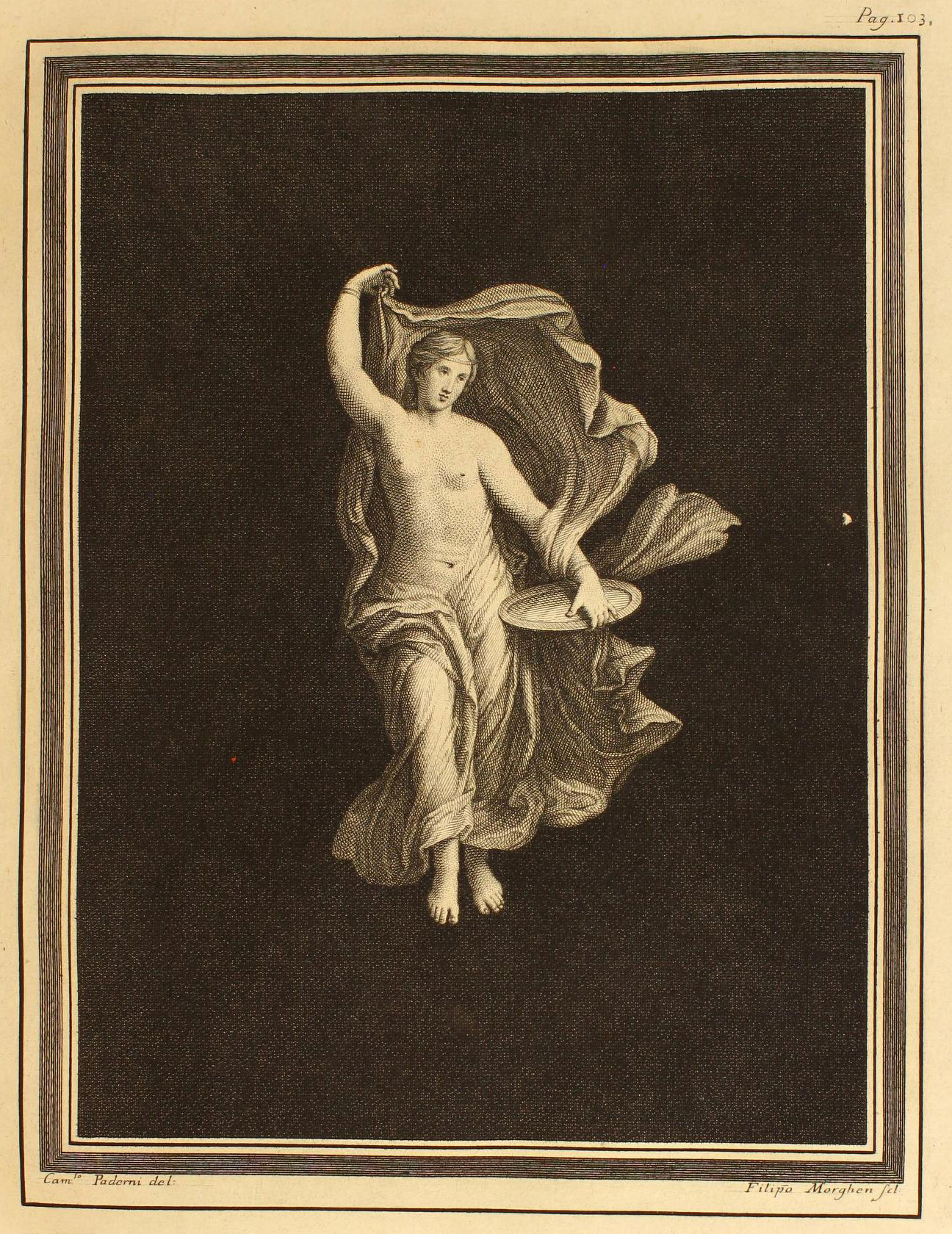

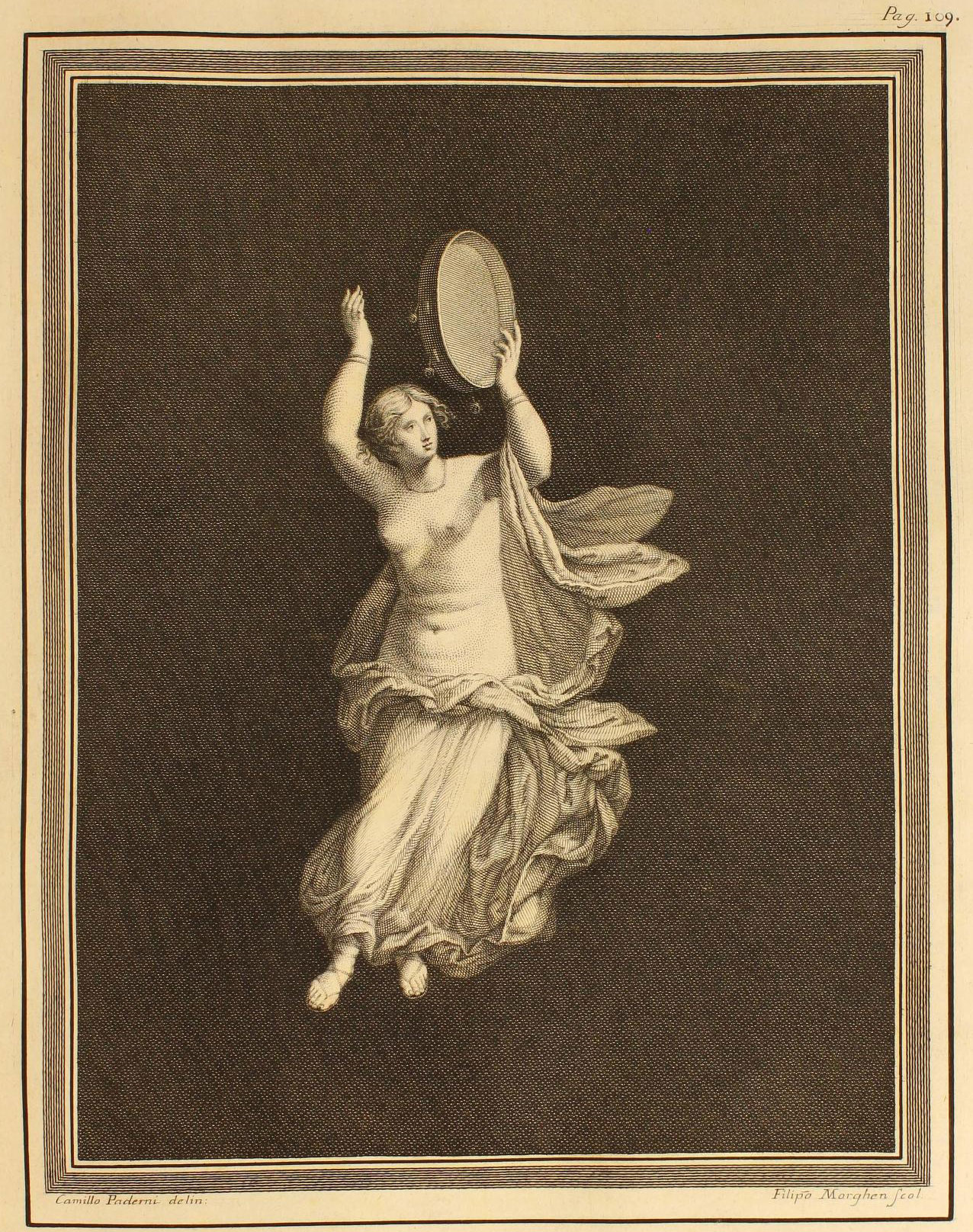

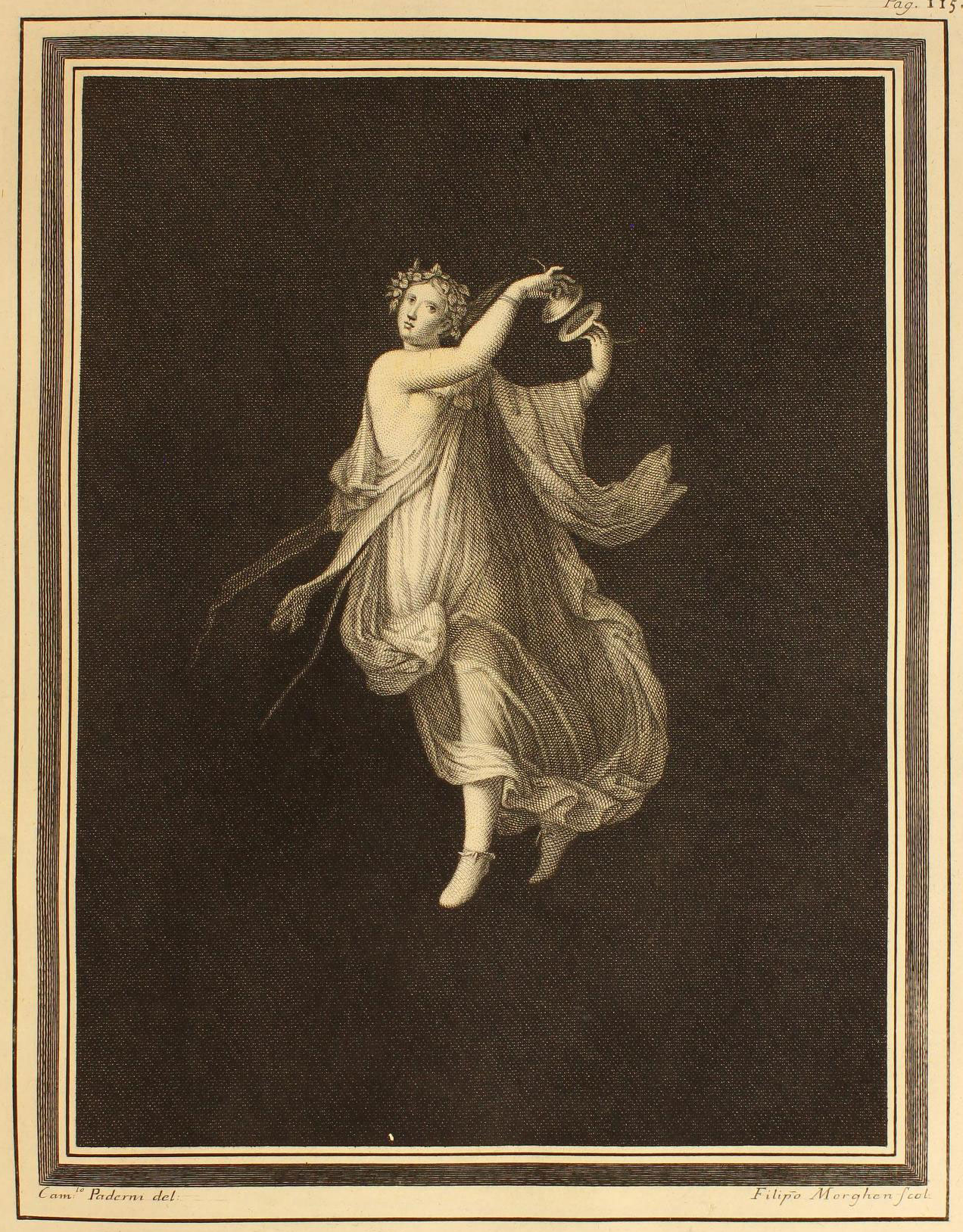

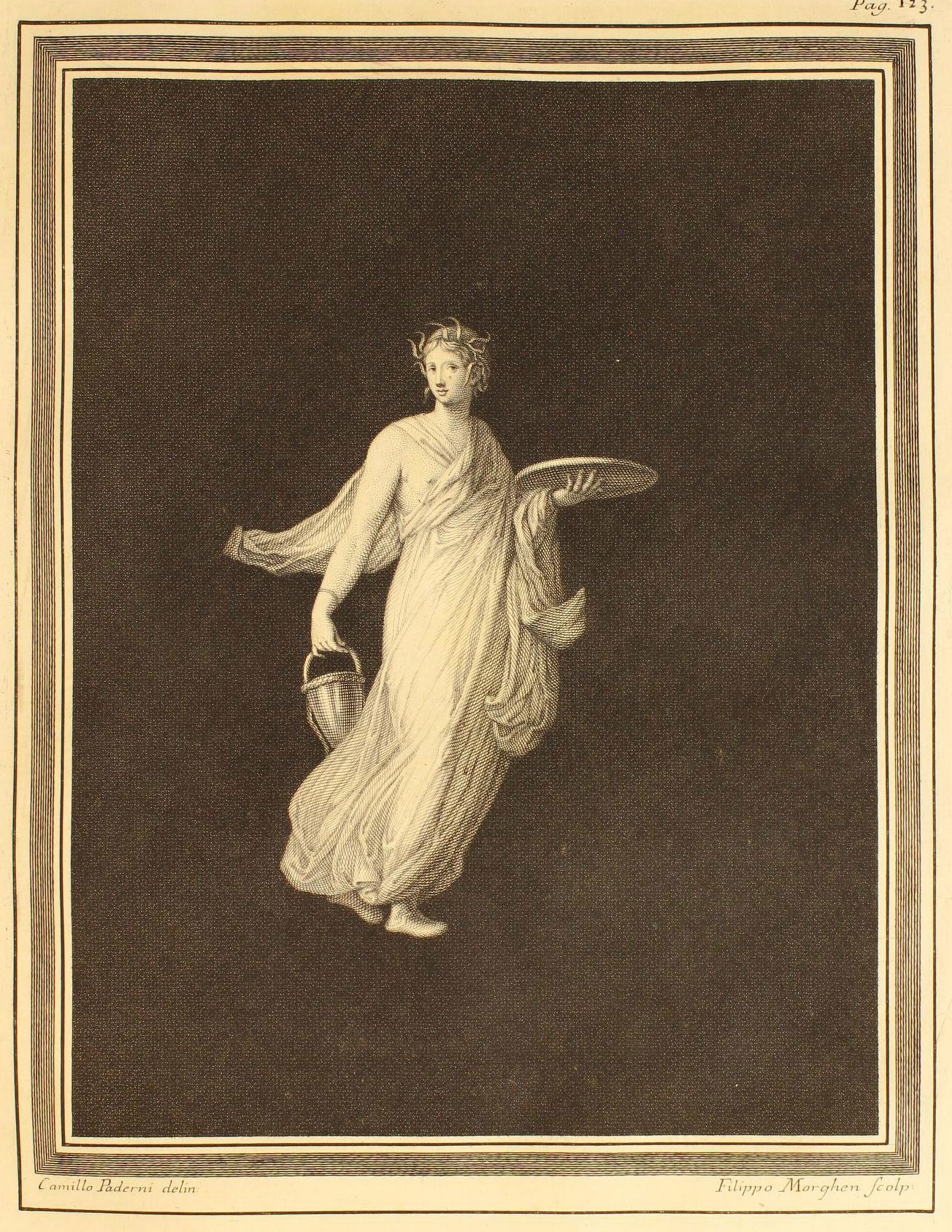

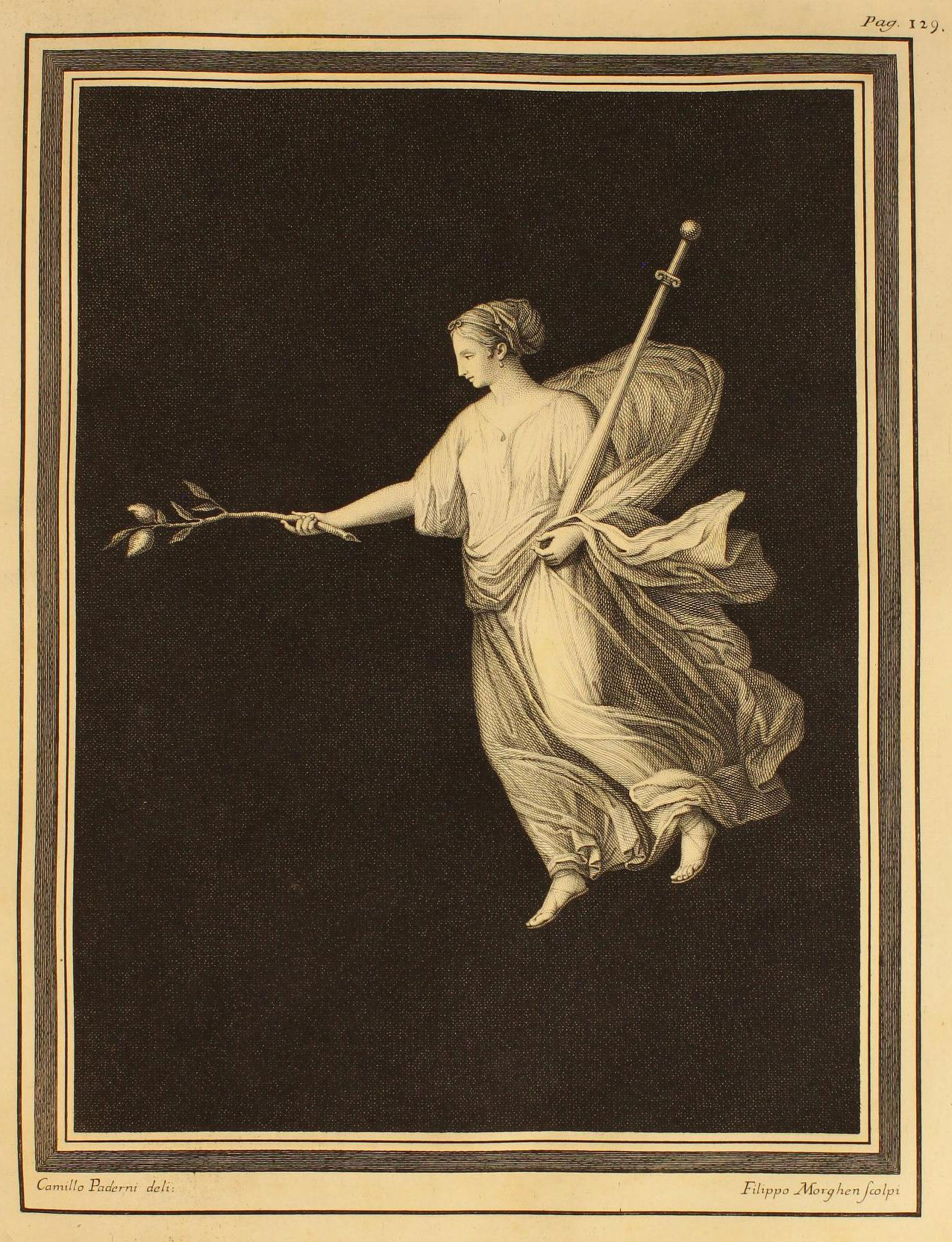

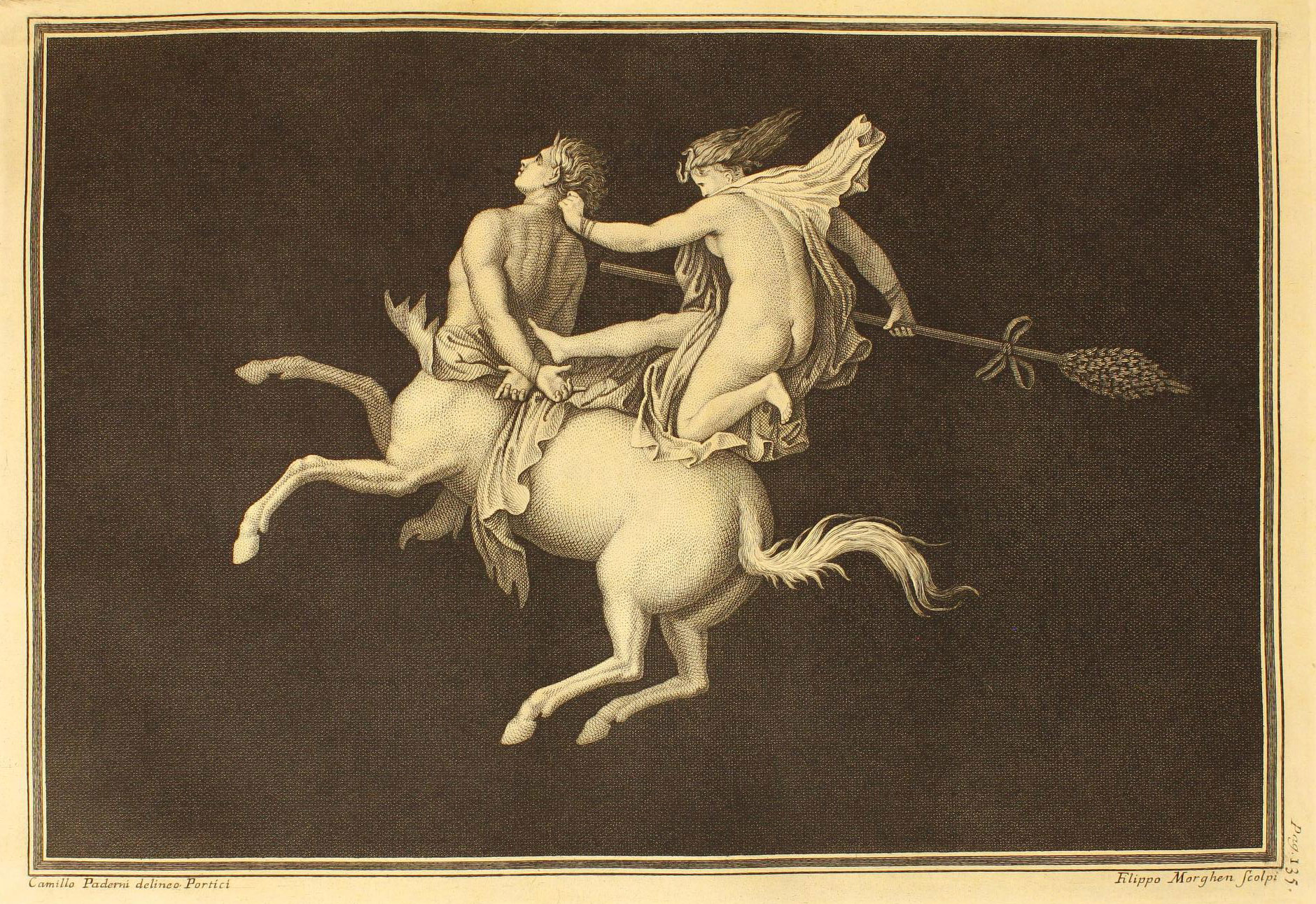

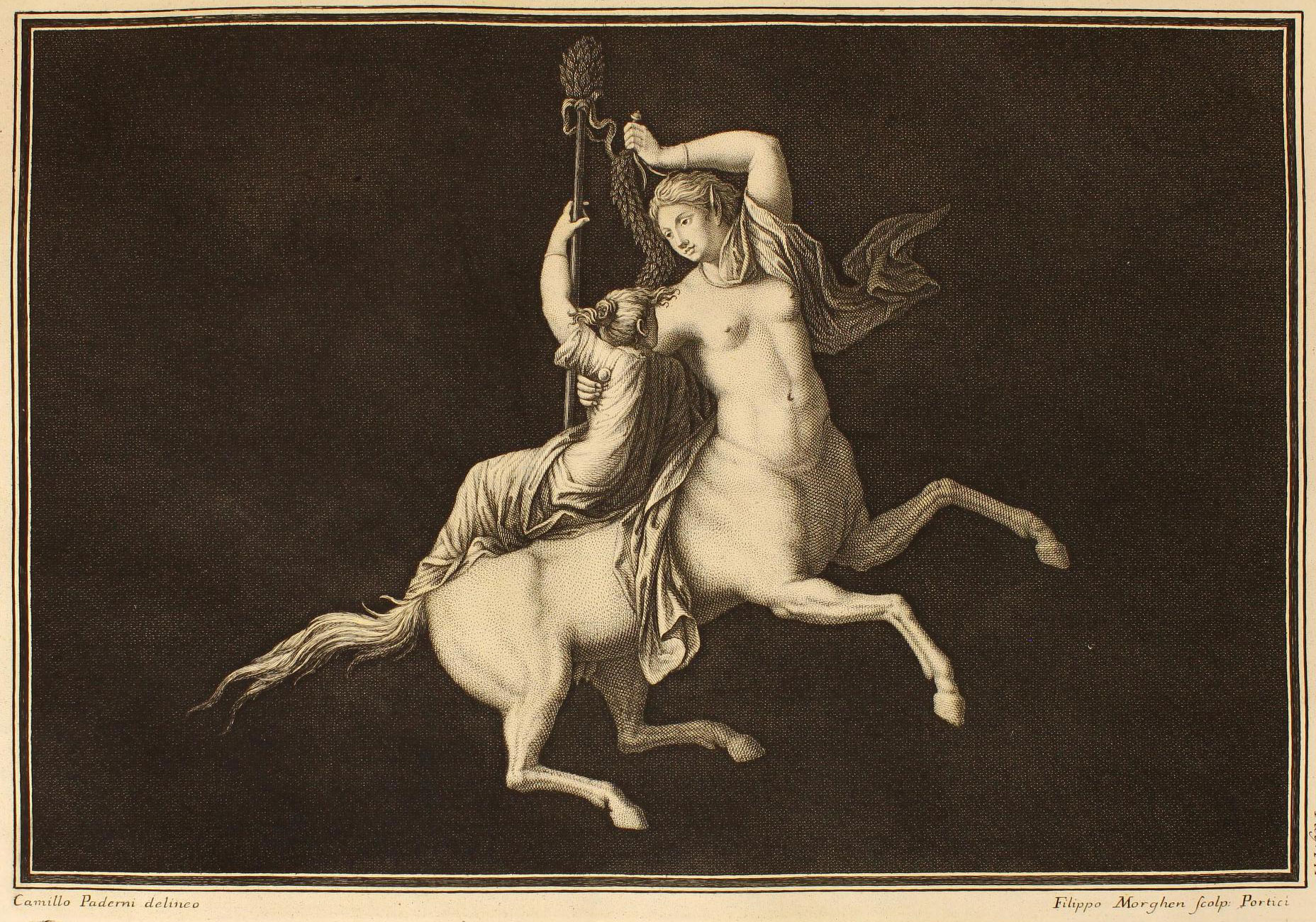
