= John Disney (priest) =

English clergyman (1677–1729/30)

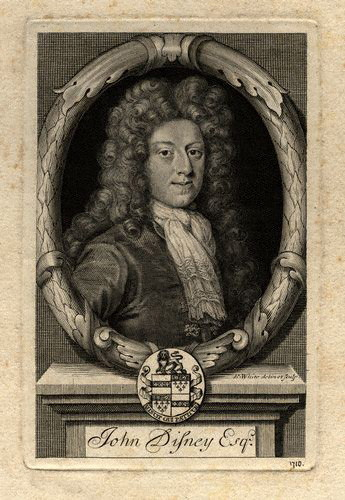
John Disney

John Disney (26 December 1677 – 3 February 1729/30) was an English clergyman. He was Vicar of Croft and Kirkby-on-Bain, Lincolnshire from 1719 to 1722, and Vicar of St. Mary's Church, Nottingham from 2 October 1722 to 1729/30.

He was the first of four John Disneys; father of John Disney of Lincoln, grandfather of John Disney (1746–1816), and great-grandfather of John Disney (1779–1857) the barrister and antiquarian.

== Life ==
He was born in Lincoln, the son of Daniel Disney of Swinderby. He began his education at Lincoln Grammar School, but his parents were dissenters and he moved school to a private college, also in Lincoln. Despite his upbringing, he was confirmed in the Church of England, sometime before 1698. In May of that year, he married Mary Woolhouse. He entered the Middle Temple in order to study law, but with no intention of practising at the bar. He gained sufficient knowledge to act as a competent magistrate and more than once was publicly complimented by the judges of the circuit for being efficient and impartial.

As a supporter of the Societies for the Reformation of Manners, he was working on a publication Corpus Legum de Moribus Reformandis shortly before his death. It was published in 1729 as A View of Ancient Laws, against Immorality and Profaneness: Under the following Heads; Lewdness; Profane Swearing, Cursing, and Blasphemy; Perjury; Prophanation of Days devoted to Religion; Contempt or Neglect of Divine Service; Drunkenness; Gaming; Idleness, Vagrancy, and Begging; Stage-Plays and Players; and Duelling. Collected from the Jewish, Roman, Greek, Gothic, Lombard, and other laws, down to the middle of the eleventh century (Cambridge: Printed for Corn. Crownfield, Printer to the University; and John Crownfield, at the Rising-Sun in St. Pauls Church-Yard; and are also sold by J. and J. Knapton).

Until the age of 42 he worked as a lay churchman and then he entered holy orders, encouraged by the Archbishop of Canterbury, William Wake, who had been bishop of Lincoln in Disney's early days. He was ordained priest in Lincoln Cathedral in 1719 by the bishop of Lincoln, Edmund Gibson, and immediately took the nearby livings of Croft and Kirkby-on-Bain. He resigned in 1722 to become vicar of St. Mary's Church, Nottingham.

The story for which Disney is remembered involves the buccaneering Archbishop Blackburne performing confirmation in St. Mary's. At the end of the proceedings, the archbishop sent out his messenger to fetch his pipe, tobacco and some ale. The messenger, returning laden up the aisle, was ejected by the Rev. John Disney with the words Neither Bishop nor Archbishop shall make a tippling house of St. Mary's so long as I am its Vicar.

== Death and legacy ==
Upon his death in 1729/30, he left a widow and eight children, five sons and three daughters. The entry for his death in the parish registers is followed by the abbreviation "Aff.". This was in accordance with the law passed in 1678, which demanded an affidavit that the bodies had been buried in woollen shrouds. His eldest son, John Disney of Lincoln, was High Sheriff of Nottinghamshire in 1733.

His writing mostly relating to the Societies for the Reformation of Manners was prolific, but he also found time to research and publish The Genealogy of the most Serene and Illustrious House of Brunswick-Lunenburgh, the present Royal Family of Great Britain in 1714.

Church of England titles
| Preceded by Samuel Berdmore | Vicar of St.Mary's Church, Nottingham; 1723–1730 | Succeeded by Thomas Berdmore |
