= Lewis Disney Fytche =

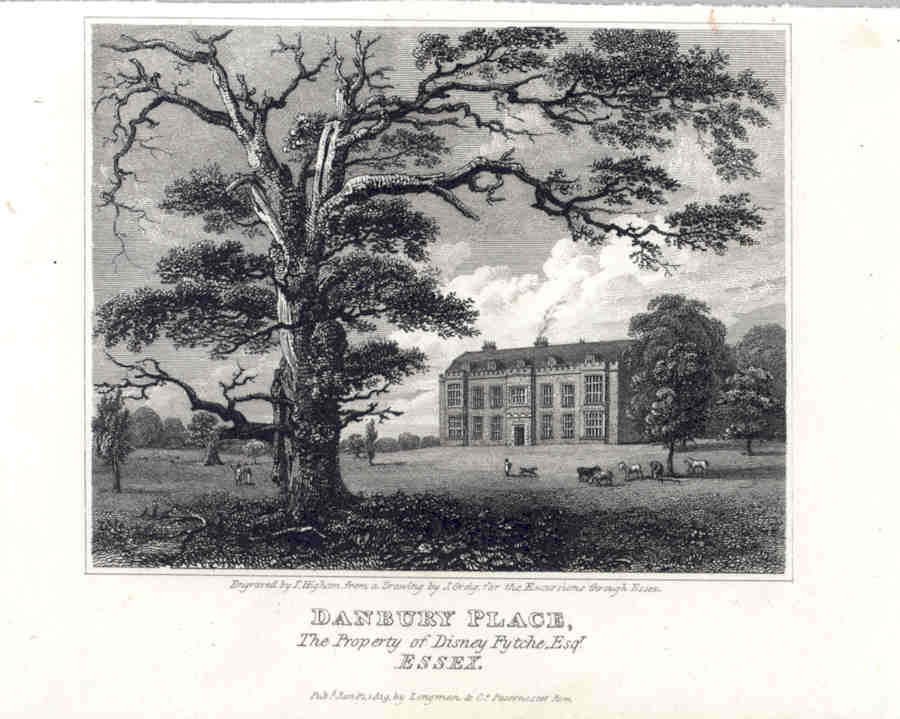
Danbury Place in the time of Disney Fytche

Lewis Disney Fytche (9 October 1738 – 1822), originally Lewis Disney, often known after his marriage as Disney Fytche, was an English radical and landowner.

== Early life ==
The son of John Disney of Lincoln, he was brother of John Disney the Unitarian. He owned Flintham Hall in Nottinghamshire, a family property. He also inherited Swinderby, in Lincolnshire. The eldest son, he received in the end the bulk of his father's property. Flintham Hall was from a grandmother.

== Reform radical ==
Disney married Elizabeth, daughter of William Fytche, on 16 September 1775. He changed his name, to Lewis Disney Fytche (ffytche), by Royal Sign Manual eleven days later, for reasons connected with property holdings. Around this time he bought Syerston, Nottinghamshire, from Lord George Manners-Sutton. He became captain in the 21st Regiment of Foot, and served in the American War of Independence. He was promoted major in 1780.

Fytche had the radical John Cartwright as a first cousin, on his mother's side. He supported the reform petition at the Essex country meeting at Chelmsford on 24 January 1780. That year he joined the Society for Constitutional Information. He attended the meeting of 28 February 1782 at the Moot Hall, Mansfield on parliamentary abuses, and the Thatched House Tavern reform meeting of 18 May 1782. His brother John was an associate of Christopher Wyvill and Capel Lofft. He himself voted for the reform petition of 24 May 1785, at the Thatched House Tavern, as reported by Wyvill.

== The simony case ==
In 1782 Fytche brought a court case over the Essex church living of Woodham Walter, in the gift of his wife and vacant by the death of Foote Gower, and his conditional presentation to it of John Eyre, against Robert Lowth as the Bishop of London. Technically the legal action was a quare impedit, and Lowth was represented by Richard Burn. He won the case in the Court of Common Pleas, where Lord Loughborough ruled that the imposed bond of resignation was valid, and then in the Court of King's Bench. He then saw the result overturned narrowly on appeal, in the House of Lords, by voting 19 against 18.

William Cowper mentioned the outcome of the case in 1783 in writing to William Cawthorne Unwin, deprecating the vote in the Lords and describing Fytche as Unwin's friend; Unwin had brought it first to his attention in early 1781, and Cowper commented on Fytche "opposing" the bishop. Unwin was in holy orders and had a living in the Chelmsford area, at Stock and Ramsden Bellhouse, the advowson belonging to his uncle John Unwin (died 1789), an ecclesiastical lawyer. His mother Mary Unwin was close to the evangelical John Newton.

In the aftermath of the case, Fytche had been given the right to nominate again. John Disney asked his brother to accept a nominee, Peter Fisher who was then chaplain to Elizabeth, Dowager Countess of Westmorland (later incumbent at Staindrop), for John Lee, a fellow Honest Whig and supporter of Essex Street Chapel. Timothy Cunningham published a work The Law of Simony (1784) dealing with the legal debate.

== European traveller ==
In 1787 Fytche's wife Elizabeth died. In 1789 he was convicted at Chelmsford of, and was later fined for, an assault against a waiter William Ford at Romford. He was acquitted of a charge of assault with attempt to commit an unnatural crime.

Fytche began to dispose of property; in 1789 he sold Flintham Hall, to Thomas Thoroton. In 1791/2 he sold Syerston to William Fillingham, who had advised the Duke of Rutland on its enclosure in 1775. Both Flintham and Syerston were parks created by enclosure acts. In 1791 he sold Disney Place in Lincoln to his brother John. In 1792 he sold the estate of Kirkstead, Lincolnshire to Richard Ellison.

Fytche then took his family to France, buying a house in the Rue d'Anjou-Saint-Honoré, Paris; this did not end well, with Fytche treated as an exiled émigré when he left the country, and his property being seized. He also purchased a French garden, the Désert de Retz, from François Racine de Monville. The political situation in France then shortly made his own position uncertain, and his property was considered that of an "enemy alien". He left for Switzerland, and the Désert de Retz was confiscated by the French revolutionary state: this was despite unavailing legal precautions, and a passport of March 1793 from the Convention. He protested to the Convention in April.

In 1795 Fytche took part in the funeral in Rome (13 September) of James Durno. In 1801 he sold his estate Danbury Place to his son-in-law, and lived in Jermyn Street, London. In 1816 he reclaimed the Désert de Retz from the French government. The case was resolved, in his favour, in 1821. The property was then sold by his heirs, in 1827.

== Danbury Place and Park ==
Danbury Place, near Danbury, Essex, was a country house built by Walter Mildmay, and his second son Humphrey Mildmay resided there. It came to Disney Fytche through his wife's uncle Thomas Fytche. He tried to sell it in 1812, to John Goslin, but the deal foundered on bad debts. Lady Hillary, divorced from her husband by 1812, continued to live at Danbury Place until her father died, when she moved to Boulogne.

== Family ==
His daughter Frances Elizabeth married William Hillary. The other daughter Sophia married John Disney the barrister, her first cousin.
