= John Disney (Unitarian) =

English Unitarian minister and biographical writer (1746–1816)

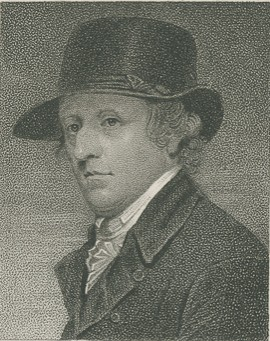

Personal life
- Born: 28 September 1746
- Died: 26 December 1816 (aged 70)
- Resting place: Fryerning, Essex
- Spouse: Jane Blackburne (m. 1774; died 1809)
- Children: 7, including John
- Education: LL.B Peterhouse, Cambridge, 1770; D.D. University of Edinburgh, 1775
- Relations: Lewis Disney (brother); Francis Blackburne (father-in-law); John Disney (grandfather); Daniel Disney (great-grandfather)

Religious life
- Religion: English Unitarian
- Institute: Society of Antiquaries of London; Society for Promoting the Knowledge of the Scriptures
- Profession: Minister, writer
- Ordination: 1768

Senior posting
- Post: Essex Street Chapel
- Period in office: 1793–1805
- Predecessor: Theophilus Lindsey
- Successor: Thomas Belsham

John Disney (1746–1816) was an English Unitarian minister and biographical writer, initially an Anglican clergyman active against subscription to the Thirty Nine Articles.

== Life ==
He was the third son of John Disney of Lincoln, born 28 September 1746. His grandfather John Disney was rector of St. Mary's, Nottingham, his great-grandfather was Daniel Disney. Disney was at Wakefield grammar school, under John Clarke, and subsequently at Lincoln grammar school. He was intended for the bar, but his health broke down under the preliminary studies, and he turned to the church. He entered Peterhouse, Cambridge in 1764 (admitted pensioner 15 June 1765), and after graduation was ordained in 1768; in 1770 he proceeded LL.B.

Sympathies with the latitudinarians were early; Disney appeared as a writer in April 1768 in defence of The Confessional, by Francis Blackburne. Immediately after his ordination he was appointed honorary chaplain to Edmund Law, Master of Peterhouse and Bishop of Carlisle. In 1769 he was presented to the vicarage of Swinderby, Lincolnshire, and soon afterwards to the rectory of Panton, in another part of the county; he held both livings, residing at Swinderby.

Disney became an active member of the association formed on 17 July 1771 to promote a petition to parliament for relief of the clergy from subscription. The petition was rejected by the House of Commons on 6 February 1772. Disney did not immediately follow the example of his friend Theophilus Lindsey, who resigned his benefice in the following year. On his way to London in December 1773, Lindsey stayed for more than a week at Swinderby. Like some others, Disney accommodated the public service to suit his special views. He had always ignored the Athanasian Creed; he now omitted the Nicene Creed and the Litany, and made other changes when using the 1662 Book of Common Prayer. On 5 June 1775 the University of Edinburgh made him D.D., through the influence of Bishop Law with Principal William Robertson; in 1778 he was admitted a fellow of the Society of Antiquaries. For a time Disney concentrated on secular duties and political action. He was an energetic magistrate, and while staying at Flintham Hall, near Newark, the seat of his eldest brother Lewis Disney, he joined in 1780 the Nottingham county committee for retrenchment and parliamentary reform.

In November 1782 Disney threw up his church preferments, and offered his services as colleague to Lindsey. At the end of December he came to London with his family, having been engaged at a stipend of £150. In 1783 Disney became the first secretary of a largely Unitarian Society for Promoting the Knowledge of the Scriptures. On the retirement of Lindsey from active duty in July 1793, Disney became sole minister. The services at Essex Street Chapel had been conducted by means of a modified common prayer-book, on the basis of a revision made by Samuel Clarke. In 1802 Disney introduced a new form of his own composition; the congregation, on his retirement, immediately reverted to the old model.

Disney's resignation of office was occasioned by a large bequest of property, which reached him indirectly. Thomas Hollis, who died in 1774, left his estates in Dorset to his friend Thomas Brand, who took the name of Hollis. Thomas Brand Hollis died in 1804, and by a will dated 1792 left both estates, worth about £5,000 a year, to Disney, who resigned his ministry on 25 March 1805, on the ground of ill-health, and in the following June left London and took up residence at The Hyde, a country house near Ingatestone, Essex. He was succeeded at Essex Street by Thomas Belsham. He took up agriculture, and participated in the applications to Parliament which resulted in the Doctrine of the Trinity Act 1813 "to relieve persons who impugn the doctrine of the Holy Trinity from certain penalties". Falling into declining health, he resided for a time at Bath, Somerset.

Disney died at The Hyde on 26 December 1816, and was buried in the churchyard of Fryerning, Essex.

== Works ==
Among his writings are biographical material relating to Michael Dodson, Robert Edward Garnham, Thomas Brand Hollis, Edmund Law, John Jebb, John Jortin, Arthur Ashley Sykes, and William Hopkins. His works include:

- A Short View of the Controversies occasioned by the Confessional and the Petition to Parliament, 1775.
- Reasons for ... quitting the Church of England, 1782; 2nd edit. 1783.
- Memoirs of the Life and Writings of Arthur Ashley Sykes, D.D., &c., 1785.
- The Works ... of John Jebb, M.D., with Memoirs, 1787, 3 vols.
- Arranged Catalogue of Publications on Toleration, Corporation, and Test Acts, 1790.
- Memoirs of the Life and Writings of John Jortin, D.D., 1792.
- Short Memoir of Bishop Edmund Law, 1800.
- Short Memoir of Michael Dodson, 1800; reprinted without the notes in Arthur Aikin's General Biography; and in full, with additions by John Towill Rutt, in Monthly Repository 1818, p. 601 sq.; Dodson had made Disney his residuary legatee, on the death of his widow.
- Memoirs of Thomas Brand Hollis, 1808.
- Short Memoir of the late Rev. Robert Edward Garnham, 1814, (reprinted in Monthly Repository 1815, p. 13 sq.)
- Short Memoir of the Rev. William Hopkins, 1815.

Besides these separate memoirs, Disney contributed others to various publications, including the memoir of his grandfather in the Biographia Britannica (Andrew Kippis). Two volumes of Disney's Sermons were published in 1793; two others, in 1816. Disney edited, with biographical preface, the Discourses of his cousin, Samuel Disney, LL.B., 1788; and, with Charles Butler, he edited A New Translation of the Book of Psalms, 1807, from the manuscript of Alexander Geddes.

A collection of controversial literature occasioned by Blackburne's Confessional, arranged by Disney in fourteen volumes, was deposited in Dr. Williams's library, of which he had been a trustee from 1796 to 1806.

== Family ==
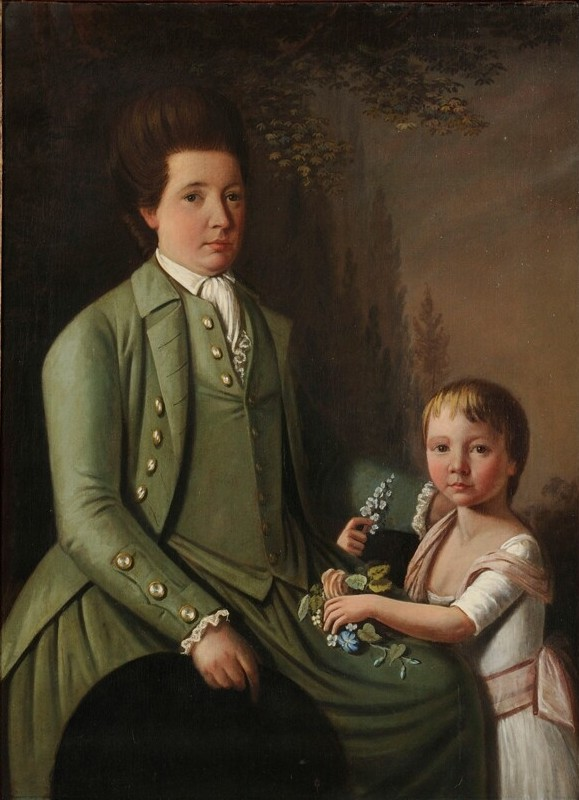
Double portrait, woman and child, the child tentatively identified as Frances Mary Disney

Disney married in 1774 Jane (died October 1809), eldest daughter of Archdeacon Francis Blackburne, and left three children, John, Algernon, who entered the army, and Frances Mary, who married Thomas Jervis.

== Sources ==
Attribution

- This article incorporates text from a publication now in the public domain: Stephen, Leslie, ed. (1888). "Disney, John (1746-1816)". Dictionary of National Biography. Vol. 15. London: Smith, Elder & Co.
