= Thomas Brand Hollis =

British political radical and dissenter

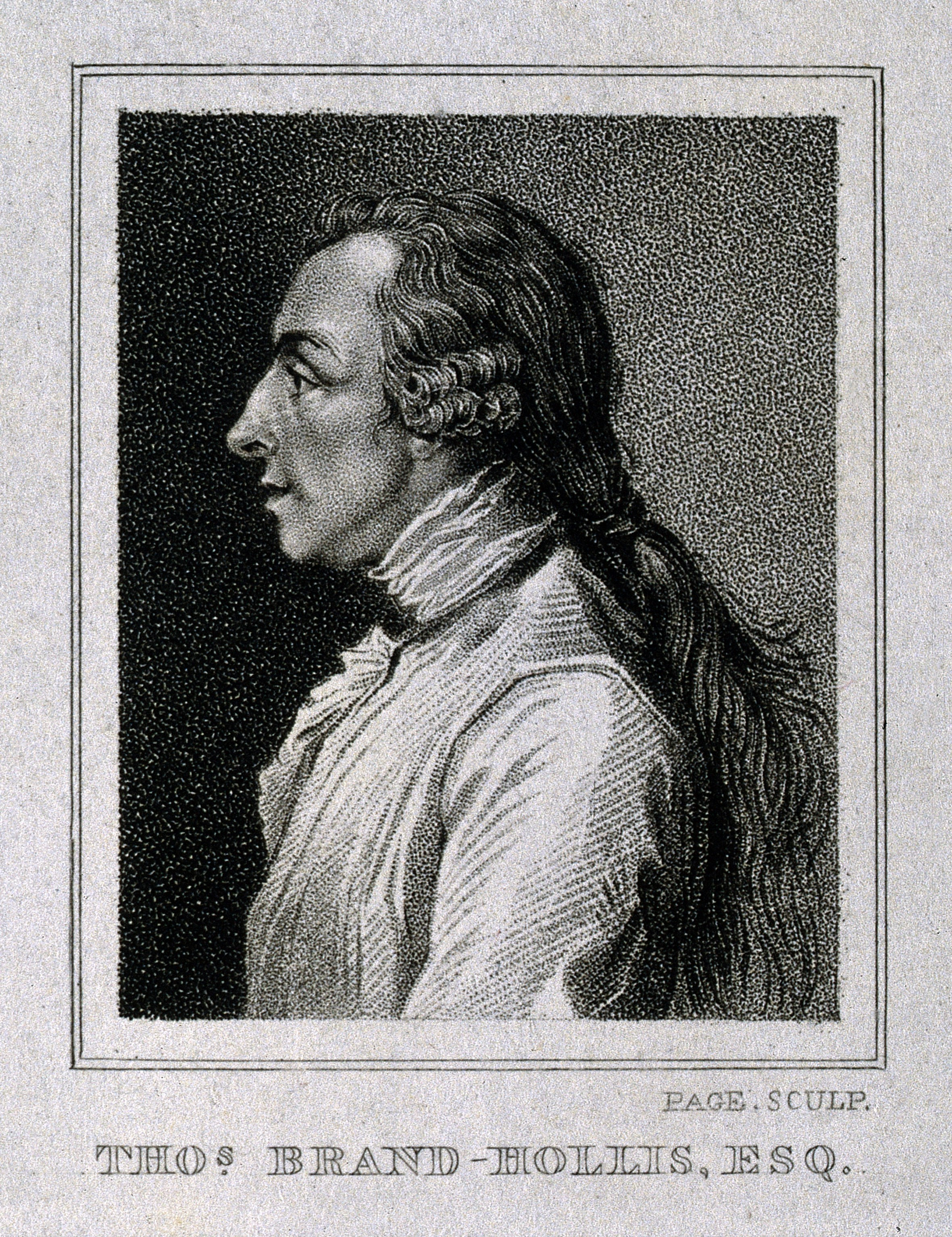
Credit: Wellcome Library

Thomas Brand Hollis (1719 – 9 September 1804), born Thomas Brand, was a British political radical and dissenter.

== Early life ==
Thomas Brand was born the only son of Timothy Brand, a mercer of Ingatestone, Essex, and his wife Sarah Michell of Rickling. He was educated at Brentwood School and Felsted School. He attended the University of Glasgow. There he was a friend of Richard Baron: both were nonconformists influenced by Francis Hutcheson. He turned down the chance to study at the Inner Temple in 1741, but did befriend the political philosopher and writer Thomas Hollis through the inns of court.

In 1748–9 Brand toured Europe with Hollis,. He made further European travels from 1750 to 1753. In June 1756 he was elected a Fellow of the Royal Society.

== Heir to Thomas Hollis ==
On his death in 1774, Hollis left his estate, at Corscombe and Halstock in Dorset, to Brand on condition that Brand added the name of Hollis to his own name.

== Political activity ==
Brand Hollis sided with the revolutionary activity in Great Britain's American colonies. He corresponded with Benjamin Franklin and Thomas Jefferson, and had Jefferson's Virginia Statute for Religious Freedom reprinted in a local newspaper, the Chelmsford Gazette. He was elected a Foreign Honorary Member of the American Academy of Arts and Sciences in 1782.

In 1774 Brand Hollis was briefly elected to Parliament as the member for Hindon, Wiltshire, by spending 15 guineas per vote. On petition the election was declared void due to bribery by the winning candidates. He and his fellow candidate, Richard Smith, were prosecuted, fined one thousand marks, and imprisoned for six months. In a rerun of the election Brand Hollis withdrew his name but Smith was re-elected.

Brand Hollis was in 1780 a founder of the Society for Constitutional Information, and a local member of the Yorkshire Association. He worked with John Jebb on a plan for radical electoral reform, drawing on ideas from James Burgh. He became a Unitarian, and campaigned against the Test Acts.

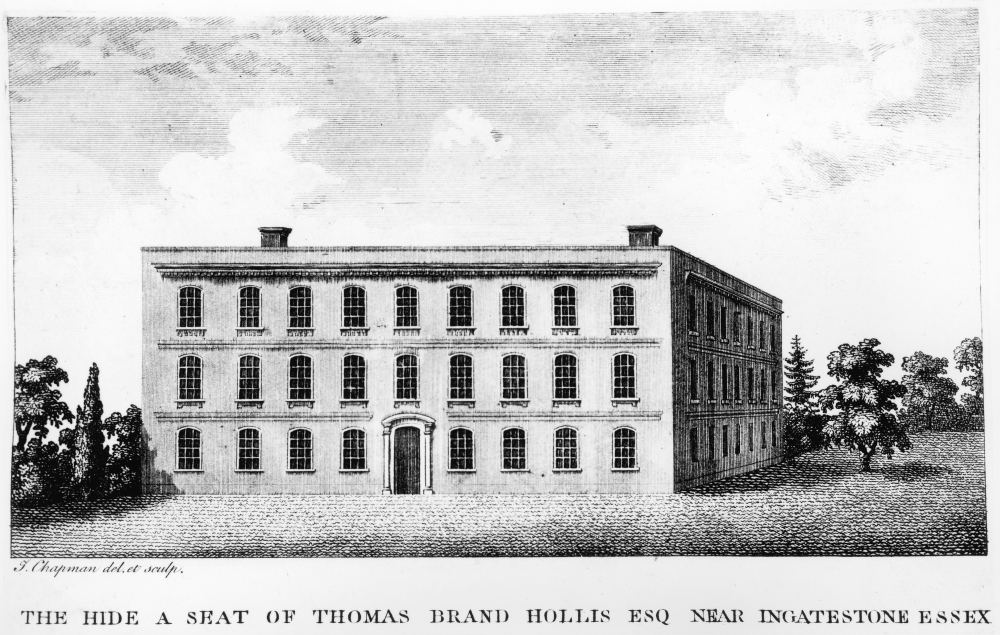
The Hyde, Essex residence of Thomas Brand Hollis

== The Hyde ==
Brand Hollis resided at The Hyde, a country house in Essex bought by his father in 1718, and improved for him in 1761 by William Chambers. In July 1786, he entertained there his friend John Adams, the first American ambassador to the Court of St. James's. Adams stayed for several days, as recorded in his memoirs.

== Death and aftermath ==
On his death in 1804 Brand Hollis left Corscombe and his own property in Ingatestone to John Disney, a personal friend. Disney erected a monument to him in Ingatestone Church, and published his Memoirs of Thomas Brand Hollis in 1808. The Hyde was demolished in 1965, following damage in a fire.
