= Richard Mead =

English physician (1673–1754)

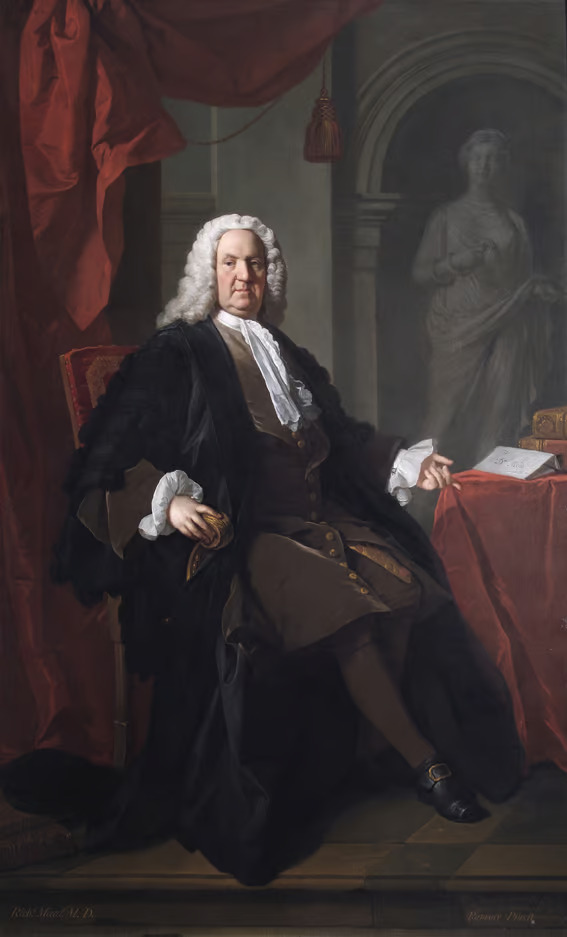
- Portrait by Allan Ramsay, 1747
- Born: 11 August 1673; Stepney, London
- Died: 16 February 1754 (aged 80)
- Known for: Epidemiology
- Scientific career
- Fields: Medicine
- Doctoral advisor: JG Graevius

Richard Mead, FRS, FRCP (11 August 1673 – 16 February 1754) was an English physician. His work, A Short Discourse concerning Pestilential Contagion, and the Method to be used to prevent it (1720), was of historic importance in advancing the understanding of transmissible diseases.

== Life ==
Richard was born in Stepney, London on 11 August 1673, son of Matthew Mead (1630–1699), who was an Independent minister. He was the eleventh of thirteen children.

He studied at Utrecht for three years under JG Graevius. Having decided to follow the medical profession, he then went to Leiden and attended the lectures of Paul Hermann and Archibald Pitcairne. In 1695 he graduated in philosophy and physic at Padua, and in 1696 he returned to London, entering at once on a successful practice.

His Mechanical Account of Poisons appeared in 1702, and, in 1703, he was admitted to the Royal Society, to whose Transactions he contributed in that year a paper on the parasitic nature of scabies. In the same year, he was elected physician to St. Thomas' Hospital, and appointed to read anatomical lectures at the Surgeon's Hall. On the death of John Radcliffe in 1714, Mead became the recognised head of his profession; he attended Queen Anne on her deathbed, and in 1727 was appointed physician to George II, having previously served him in that capacity when he was prince of Wales.

While in the service of the king, Mead got involved in the creation of a new charity, the Foundling Hospital, both as a founding governor and as an advisor on all things medical. The Foundling Hospital was a home for abandoned children rather than a medical hospital, but it is said that through Dr. Mead's involvement, the Foundling was equipped with both a sick room and a pharmacy. He is even supposed to have influenced the architect, Theodore Jacobsen, into incorporating a large courtyard to promote the children exercising. A full-size portrait of Dr Mead, donated by the artist Allan Ramsay in 1747, ensures that his contribution will not be forgotten, and is permanently displayed at the Foundling Museum.

Mead was also a Fellow of the Royal Society, a Fellow of the College of Physicians and a Freemason (although it is not known to which lodge he belonged).

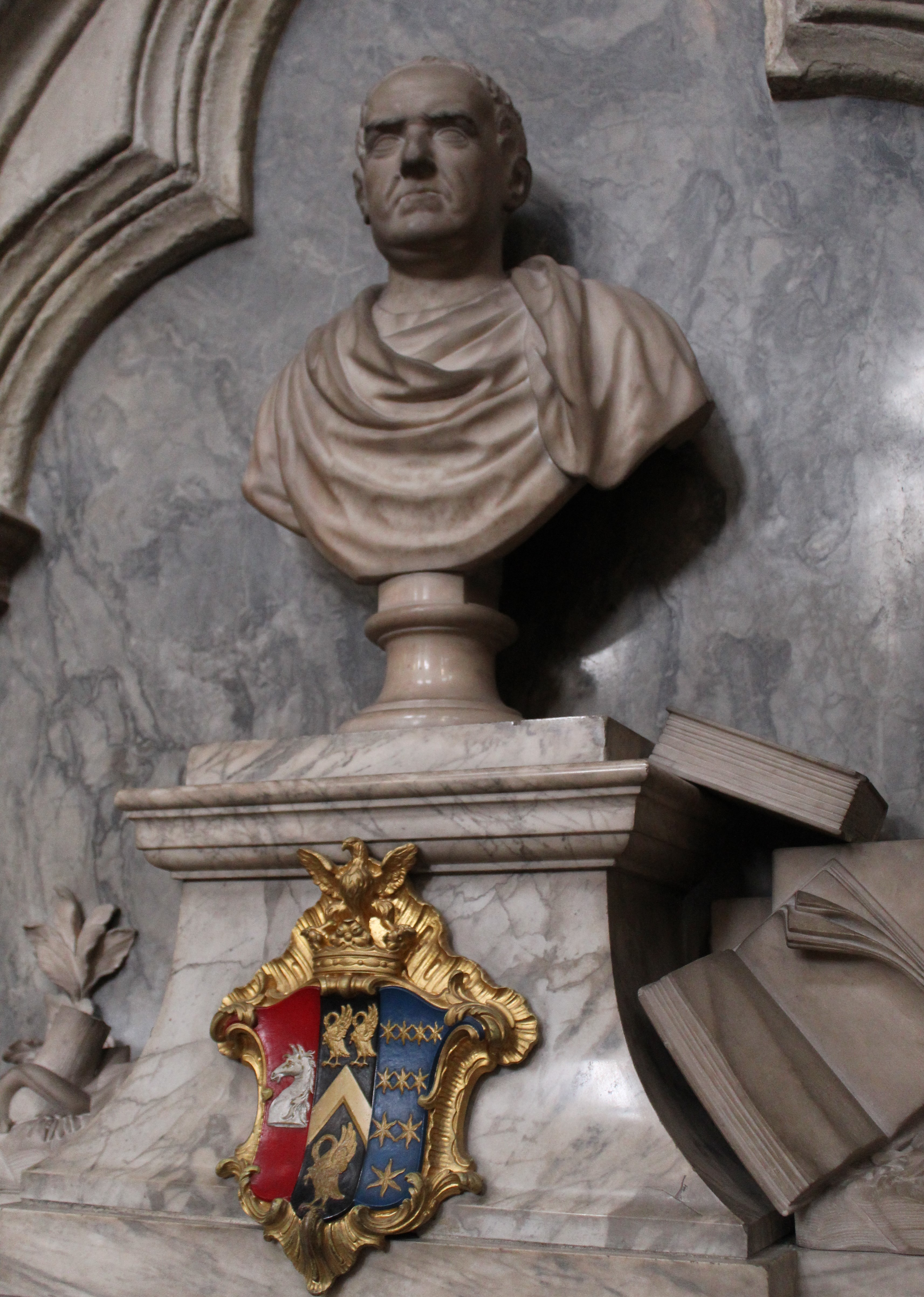
Bust of Mead, Westminster Abbey

Mead was a collector of paintings, rare books, classical sculpture, gems and zoological specimens, which he made available for study at the library in his Bloomsbury house. His collection consisted of 10,000 volumes. In 1752 he received a letter from Camillo Paderni, concerning the progress at the excavations of the Villa of the Papyri. After his death, it took 56 days to auction them to book collectors from England and abroad. His "Genuine and Entire Collection of Valuable Gems, Bronzes, Marble and other Busts and Antiquities" was auctioned by Abraham Langford at his house in the Great Piazza, Covent Garden on 11–15 March 1755.

Mead's country estate was at Old Windsor in Berkshire, but he died at his house in Bloomsbury in 1754. His London home later formed the basis of Great Ormond Street Hospital.

Mead was buried in Temple Church. A monument to him was placed in the north aisle of the nave of Westminster Abbey, with a bust by Peter Scheemakers.

== Religious views ==
In 1749 was published in Latin Mead's Medica Sacra (issued posthumously in 1755 in translation with the subtitle A commentary on the most remarkable diseases, mentioned in the Holy Scriptures). He made use of the work of his relative Joseph Mede's Doctrine of Demons and also of his once patient Isaac Newton's Chronology to argue that pagan ideas regarding demons had entered Christianity. Like Arthur Ashley Sykes and others, Mead understood those afflicted by demons in the New Testament to refer simply to those suffering from a variety of illnesses:

That the Daemoniacs, daimonizomenoi, mentioned in the gospels, laboured under a disease really natural, though of an obstinate and difficult kind, appears to me very probable from the accounts given of them.

== Possible foibles ==
Mead is satirised in Laurence Sterne's novel, Tristram Shandy, where he briefly appears as Dr Kunastrokius: "—Did not Dr. Kunastrokius, that great man, at his leisure hours, take the greatest delight imaginable in combing of asses' tails, and plucking the dead hairs out with his teeth, though he had tweezers always in his pocket?" The name Kunastrokius is clearly a sexual pun, perhaps referencing Voltaire's Cunegund of Candide (1759). One of Sterne's correspondents later complained that he was reviving widespread rumours that Mead had gone bankrupt due to paying for elaborate sexual favours. Sterne defended himself on the grounds that all he did was "most distantly hint at a droll foible in his character...known before by every chamber-maid and footman within the bills of mortality".

== Works ==
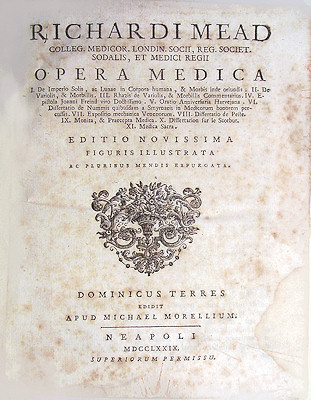

Besides the Mechanical Account of Poisons (2nd ed, 1708), Mead published:

- a treatise De Imperio Solis ac Lunae in Corpora humana, & Morbis inde oriundis (On the Influence of the Sun and Moon upon Human Bodies and the Diseases Arising Therefrom) (1704)
- A Short Discourse concerning Pestilential Contagion, and the Method to be used to prevent it (1720)
- De variolis et morbillis dissertatio (1747)
- Medica sacra, sive de morbis insignioribus qui in bibliis memorantur commentarius (1748)
- On the Scurvy (1749)
- Monita et praecepta medica . Grund & Holle, Hamburgi 1752 Digital edition by the University and State Library Düsseldorf
- Life of Mead by Dr Matthew Maty appeared in 1755.
- Pharmacopoeia [Pharmacopoea] Meadiana : faithfully gathered from original Prescriptions, containing the most elegant Methods of Cure in Diseases; to which are annexed useful Observations upon each Prescription; the whole digested under proper Heads . Hinton, London 1756 Digital edition by the University and State Library Düsseldorf

== Sources ==
- Zuckerman, A (Summer 2004). "Plague and contagionism in eighteenth-century England: the role of Richard Mead". Bulletin of the History of Medicine. 78 (2): 273–308. doi:10.1353/bhm.2004.0105. ISSN 0007-5140. PMID 15211050. S2CID 37307465.
- Jordanova, L (September 2003). "Portraits, people and things: Richard Mead and medical identity". History of Science. 41 (133 Pt 3): 293–313. Bibcode:2003HisSc..41..293J. doi:10.1177/007327530304100306. ISSN 0073-2753. PMID 14560731. S2CID 41089365.
- Roos, AM (Fall 2000). "Luminaries in medicine: Richard Mead, James Gibbs, and solar and lunar effects on the human body in early modern England". Bulletin of the History of Medicine. 74 (3): 433–57. doi:10.1353/bhm.2000.0129. ISSN 0007-5140. PMID 11016094. S2CID 10829481.
- Riesman, D (March 1985). "Dr. Richard Mead and the motto of the College of Physicians of Philadelphia". Transactions & Studies of the College of Physicians of Philadelphia. 7 (1): 33–41. ISSN 0010-1087. PMID 3887688.
- Mann, RJ (July 1973). "Historical vignette. Richard Mead, M.D., 1673–1754. 18th-Century exemplar of 'experience and reason'". Mayo Clinic Proceedings. 48 (7): 503–6. ISSN 0025-6196. PMID 4577312.
- Abbott, JL (Autumn 1971). "Samuel Johnson and 'The Life of Dr. Richard Mead'". Bulletin of the John Rylands University Library of Manchester. 54: 12–27. doi:10.7227/bjrl.54.1.2. ISSN 0301-102X. PMID 11616730.
- "Richard Mead (1673–1754) successor to John Radcliffe". JAMA. 208 (11): 2156–7. June 1969. doi:10.1001/jama.208.11.2156. ISSN 0098-7484. PMID 4890693.
- Barnett Cf, Jr (March 1963). "Richard MEAD: a neglected polyhistor". The New Physician. 12: A58–A60. ISSN 0028-6451. PMID 13969385.
- Carter, HS (July 1958). "Richard Mead". Scottish Medical Journal. 3 (7): 320–4. doi:10.1177/003693305800300706. ISSN 0036-9330. PMID 13555965. S2CID 29923304.
- "RICHARD MEAD: pioneer and patron". British Medical Journal. 1 (4858): 392. February 1954. ISSN 0007-1447. PMC 2084565. PMID 13115737.
- Hanson, Craig (1 April 2003). "Dr Richard Mead and Watteau's 'Comédiens Italiens'". The Burlington Magazine. 145 (1201). The Burlington Magazine Publications, Ltd.: 265–272. ISSN 0007-6287. JSTOR 3100665.
- Meade, Richard Hardway (1974). In the Sunshine of Life: A Biography of Dr. Richard Mead, 1673–1754. Philadelphia: Dorrance. ISBN 978-0-8059-1921-9.
- Zuckerman, Arnold (1965). "Dr. Richard Mead (1674–1753): A Biographical Study". Urbana: University of Illinois.
- Nichols, R. H.; Wray, F. A. (1935). The History of the Foundling Hospital. London: Oxford University Press.
- Munk, William. "Richard Mead". Lives of the Fellows. II: 40. Archived from the original on 3 December 2013.
- This article incorporates text from a publication now in the public domain: Chisholm, Hugh, ed. (1911). "Mead, Richard". Encyclopædia Britannica. Vol. 17 (11th ed.). Cambridge University Press. p. 945.
