= Thomas Hollis (1720–1774) =

English political philosopher and author

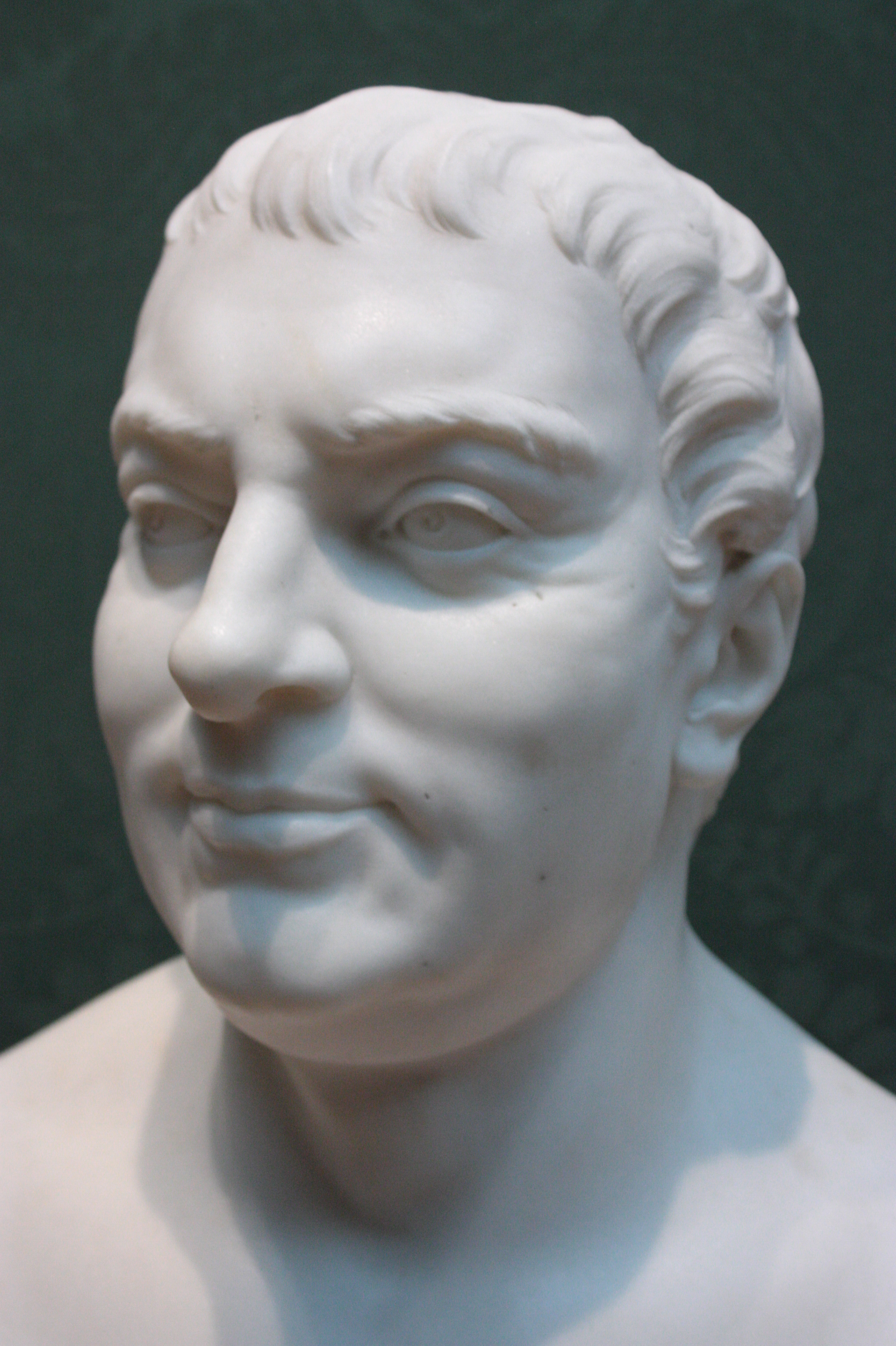
- Bust of Thomas Hollis by Joseph Wilton, National Portrait Gallery, London
- Born: 14 April 1720; London, England, Great Britain
- Died: 1 January 1774 (aged 53)

Thomas Hollis FRS FRSA (14 April 1720 – 1 January 1774) was an English political philosopher and author.

== Early life ==
Hollis was educated at Adams Grammar School in Newport, Shropshire, until the age 10, and then in St. Albans until 15, before learning French, Dutch, and accountancy in Amsterdam. After the death of his father in 1735, his guardian was a John Hollister. He was trained in this time in public service by John Ward of Gresham College, London. He took Chambers with Lincoln's Inn from 1740 to 1748, though without ever reading law. By this time, he was a man of considerable wealth having inherited from his father, grandfather and uncle.

== Travel and art ==
From 1748–1749, Hollis toured Europe with Thomas Brand (later Brand Hollis) and again during 1750–1753, largely on his own, meeting many leading French philosophers and several Italian painters, among them possibly Camillo Paderni, who wrote him letters about his excavations as the Villa of the Papyri in 1754. Back in England, he was an active member of the Royal Society of Arts. He proposed Piranesi for membership of the Society of Antiquaries, gave numerous commissions to Cipriani, and, as one of Canaletto's best friends in England, commissioned six paintings from him. These paintings included Old Walton Bridge in which Hollis, his heir Thomas Brand and Hollis's manservant were depicted, also the interior of the rotunda at Ranelagh. He was elected a Fellow of the Royal Society in 1757. He was well connected, knowing Francis Blackburne and Theophilus Lindsey, John Wilkes, several peers, and the elder William Pitt. He was a governor of Guy's and St Thomas's hospitals, and a guardian of the asylum and Magdalen Hospital.

== Writing ==
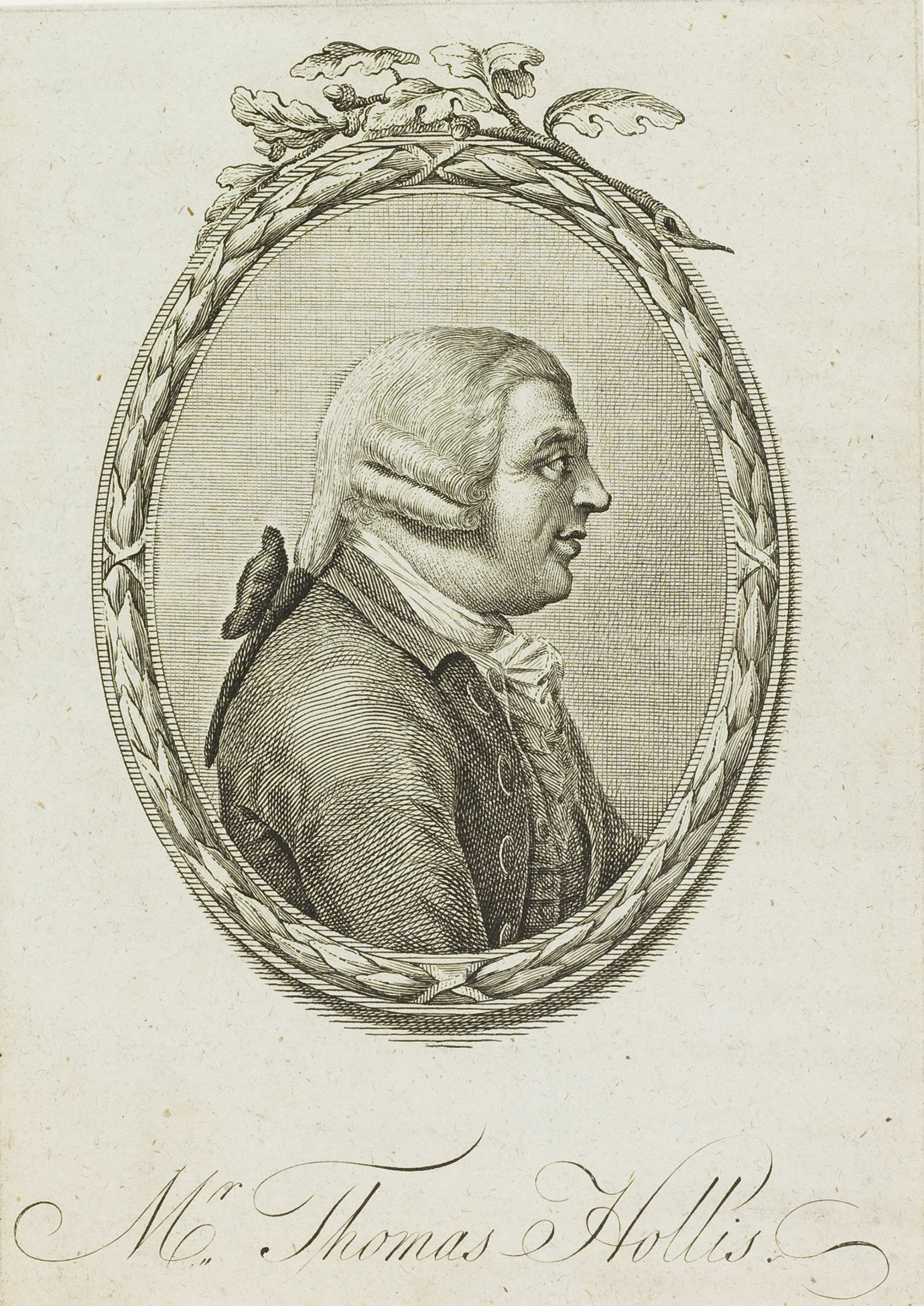
Thomas Hollis

Hollis's main contribution to public service was protecting and advancing English liberty by circulating appropriate books on government. From 1754, he reprinted and distributed literature from the seventeenth-century, including works such as Toland's Life of Milton, tracts by Marchamont Nedham, Henry Neville, and Philip Sidney, and John Locke's Two Treatises of Government. From 1760, he had commissioned the bookseller Andrew Millar to publish works advocating republican government, including John Milton (1760), John Toland (1760), Algernon Sidney (1763), Henry Neville (1763) and John Locke (1764). The books were elegantly bound to give them greater effect and tooled with libertarian ornaments such as the liberty cap and owl. He also published writings by American colonists on the Stamp Act crisis, including John Adams's Dissertation on the Canon and the Feudal Law (1765).

To start with the tracts were directed towards libraries throughout Britain and continental Europe; later he turned his generosity to America.

He continued his great-uncle Thomas's practice, as a great benefactor to American colleges, especially Harvard, sending donations and numerous books, often decorated with libertarian symbols. From 1755, his principal American correspondent was Jonathan Mayhew of Boston, and, after Mayhew's death in 1766, Andrew Eliot. His other benefactions included substantial donations to Bern Library and to the University of Leiden Library.

Hollis was the patron and a friend of William Harris (historian).

He died suddenly on 1 January 1774 aged 53. He was unmarried, and after minor legacies left his estates to Thomas Brand, who added Hollis's name to his own.
