= Thomas Jervis (minister) =

English unitarian minister

Thomas Jervis (1748–1833) was an English unitarian minister.

== Life ==
Jervis was born in Ipswich on 13 January 1748. He was the son of William Jervis (d. 24 March 1797, aged 72), minister of the presbyterian congregation in St. Nicholas Street, Ipswich. He was educated for the ministry in London at Wellclose Square, under David Jennings, and at Hoxton, under Savage, Andrew Kippis, and Abraham Rees. In 1770 he became classical and mathematical tutor at the Exeter Academy, having also the charge of a presbyterian congregation at Lympstone, Devonshire. In 1771–2 he shared with James Perry Bartlett the charge of the congregations at Lympstone and Topsham, Devon.

William Petty, second earl of Shelburne, engaged him in 1772, on the recommendation of Richard Price, D.D., as resident tutor to his sons at Bowood, Wiltshire, a situation which he filled till 1783. Here he associated with Joseph Priestley, who was Shelburne's librarian till 1780. Jervis, who was ordained in 1779, moved to London about 1783, and became minister of the presbyterian congregation in St Thomas Street, Southwark. He was elected a trustee of Dr. Daniel Williams's foundations in 1786. On the death of Kippis he was elected his successor (1796) at Princes Street, Westminster. Up to this time his views were low Arian, and it is doubtful whether they underwent any further development. In the summer of 1808 he succeeded William Wood as minister of the unitarian congregation at Mill Hill, Leeds. He resigned this charge, and left the active ministry in 1818.

Returning to London, he was re-elected to Dr. Williams's trust in 1823. His closing years were spent in literary leisure. He died at Brompton Grove on 31 August 1833, and was buried in the churchyard of Fryerning, Essex. He married Frances Mary, daughter of John Disney, D.D.

== Works ==
Jervis published nineteen separate sermons and addresses (1784–1820), some of which are reprinted in (1) 'Sermons,’ &c., 1811; (2) 'Remarks in Refutation of … Story of a Supernatural Appearance related by the Rev. R. Warner,’ &c., 1831; reprinted 1832. He wrote many biographies for The Gentleman's Magazine and Monthly Repository, and several hymns for the collections of Kippis and others. One of his hymns written in 1795, 'Sweet is the friendly voice,’ is in Martineau's collections.

== Family ==
John Jervis (1752–1820), younger brother of the above, was born at Ipswich in 1752. He succeeded his brother at Lympstone in 1773, was ordained in 1779, and held this charge till his death on 27 October 1820. He was a fellow of the Linnean Society, and a mineralogist. His religious views resembled those of his brother.
