= William Henry Flower =

English comparative anatomist and surgeon

Sir William Henry Flower
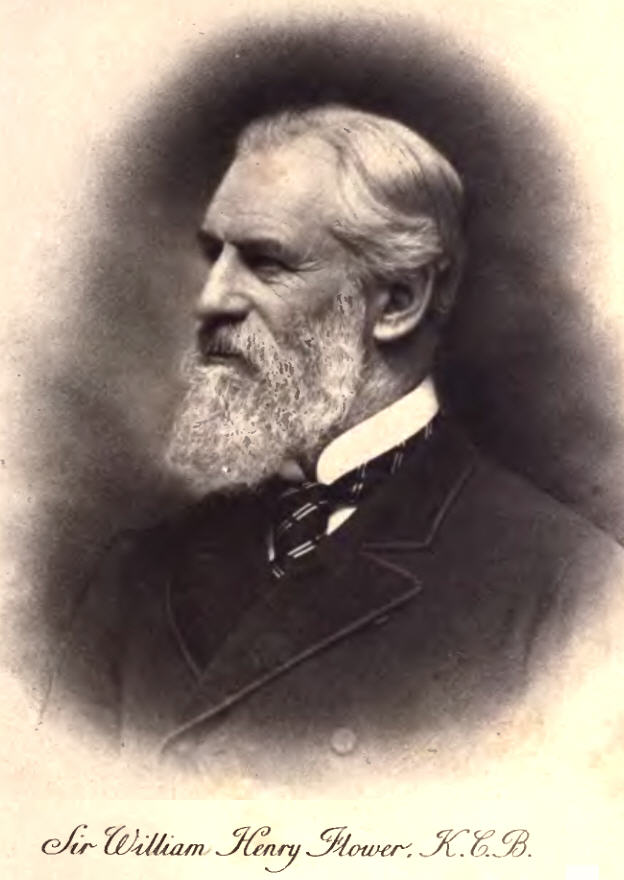
- Born: 30 November 1831; Stratford-upon-Avon, England
- Died: 1 July 1899 (aged 67); Kensington, London, England
- Education: University College London
- Awards: Royal Medal (1882)
- Scientific career
- Fields: Zoology
- Workplaces: British Army; Royal College of Surgeons; Natural History Museum
- Author abbrev. (zoology): Flower

Sir William Henry Flower KCB FRS FRCS FRAI (30 November 1831 – 1 July 1899) was an English surgeon, museum curator and comparative anatomist, who became a leading authority on mammals and especially on the primate brain. He supported Thomas Henry Huxley in an important controversy with Richard Owen about the human brain and eventually succeeded Owen as Director of the Natural History Museum in London.

== Origins and early years ==
Born on 30 November 1831 in his father's house at Stratford-upon-Avon in Warwickshire, he was the second son of Edward Fordham Flower, founder of the town brewery, and his wife Celina Greaves (1804‍–‍1884), eldest daughter of John Greaves and his wife Mary Whitehead. His paternal grandfather Richard Flower had married Elizabeth Fordham on 24 Dec 1786 in St Andrew's Church, Newcastle upon Tyne, and settled at Albion, Illinois, where their children grew up.

His uncles included the slate entrepreneur John Whitehead Greaves and William Pickering, Governor of Washington. His elder brother Charles Edward Flower ran the family brewery with the third brother Edgar Flower, while he chose a scientific career.

First taught at home by his mother, he went to a school in Edgbaston at the age 11 and then from age 13 to a Pestalozzian school at Worksop under a Swiss headmaster, Dr B. Heldenmaier. There were ten hours schooling each day which included, rare at that time, science. Already a collector of natural history objects, he was made curator of the school museum and for almost all the rest of his life was a museum curator of one kind or another.

He then attended University College London, followed by the Middlesex Hospital, where he studied medicine and surgery. Graduating as an MB of London University in 1851, he won a gold medal in physiology and a silver in zoology and comparative anatomy. In 1852 he read his first paper before the Zoological Society of London, of which he was made a Fellow.

== Medical career ==
Appointed a junior house surgeon at the Middlesex Hospital, after six months he was promoted to senior house surgeon and in 1854 passed the exam to become an MRCS (Member of the Royal College of Surgeons). Also in 1854 he became Curator of the Middlesex Hospital Museum.

However, with the outbreak of the Crimean War that year, he joined the British Army and was appointed as Assistant-Surgeon to the 63rd (West Suffolk) Regiment of Foot. Embarking at Cork in July 1854, they sailed for Constantinople and then on to the Crimea, landing at Kalamita Bay in August. Within four months, the regiment was reduced in strength by almost one half from cold, exposure, infectious disease and, lastly, enemy action. His own health broke down and he had to be invalided home, never fully recovering. In recognition of his services, he received from the hands of Queen Victoria the Crimea Medal with clasps for Alma, Inkerman, Balaclava, and Sebastopol. Later, he received the Turkish Crimean War medal as well.

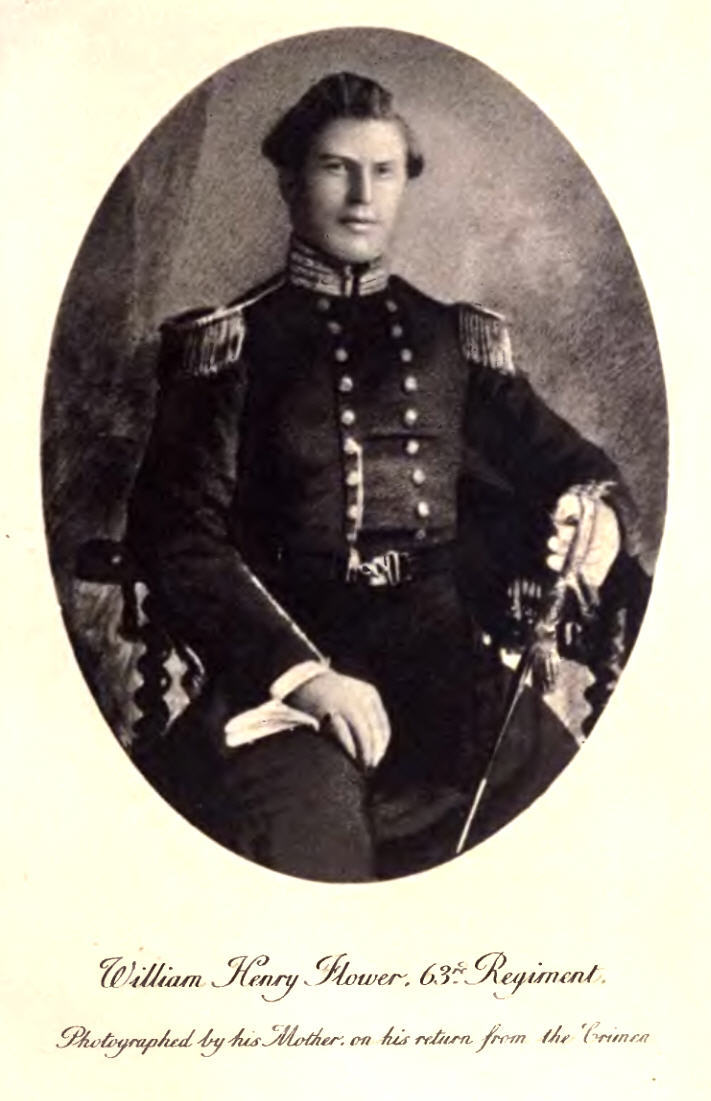
Photographed by his mother after his return from the Crimea

When fit to work he returned to London, taking the diploma to become an FRCS (Fellow of the Royal College of Surgeons) in 1857 and joining the staff of the Middlesex Hospital as a Demonstrator in Anatomy. In 1858 he married, and during the next year became Assistant-Surgeon at the Middlesex, curator of the Anatomical Museum and also Lecturer on Comparative Anatomy. In his 1859 lecture to the Royal United Services Institute on practical surgery for naval and military officers, as a direct result of his Crimean experience he summarised the first aid knowledge needed by soldiers and sailors to help the wounded before a surgeon was available.

== The evolution debate ==
In 1860, intellectual circles in London were alive with talk of evolution, which, of course, was in conflict with the Bible. Seven prominent men, six of them Churchmen, published their views in "Essays and Reviews" in March 1860; one of the six was the Rev. Prof. Baden Powell (1796–1860), the husband of Flower's mother's elder sister. Flower, long interested in the wider sphere of natural history rather than just human physiology, decided to move his career in that direction. A probable influence was Thomas Henry Huxley, also a comparative anatomist and Fullerian Professor at the Royal Institution at the time, and his first contact with Huxley came through the naval surgeon, zoologist, and palaeontologist George Busk.

With Huxley he became engaged in controversy with Richard Owen, who claimed that the human brain had unique structures not present in simians. Huxley had contradicted this at the British Association meeting at Oxford in 1860, which included a debate on evolution, and promised proof. He was among experts consulted by Huxley and gave demonstrations at Huxley's public lectures, using monkey brains rather than scarce ape brains. He published papers on the brains of four species of monkey, and at the 1862 meeting of the British Association in Cambridge, after Owen read a paper repeating his claims, stood up saying "I happen to have in my pocket a monkey's brain" and produced the object in question.

In the evolution debate he was among those who, like his wife's brother-in-law. the Reverend Professor Baden Powell, saw no threat to religious belief in accepting the theory. In 1883 he expounded his view in an address to the Church Congress in Reading under the title: "The bearing of science on religion".

== Transfer to zoology ==
On the recommendation of Huxley and others, in 1862 he became Conservator of the Hunterian Museum of the Royal College of Surgeons of England, holding the post for 22 years, and in 1864 was elected a Fellow of the Royal Society.

In 1870 he became Hunterian Professor of Comparative Anatomy, in succession to Huxley, and began a series of lectures that ran for fourteen years, all on aspects of the Mammalia. The essence was published in his books of 1870 and 1891. He was elected President of the Zoological Society of London in 1879, holding the post for life, and in 1882 was awarded the Royal Medal of the Royal Society. From 1883 to 1885 he was President of the Anthropological Institute.

== Natural History Museum ==
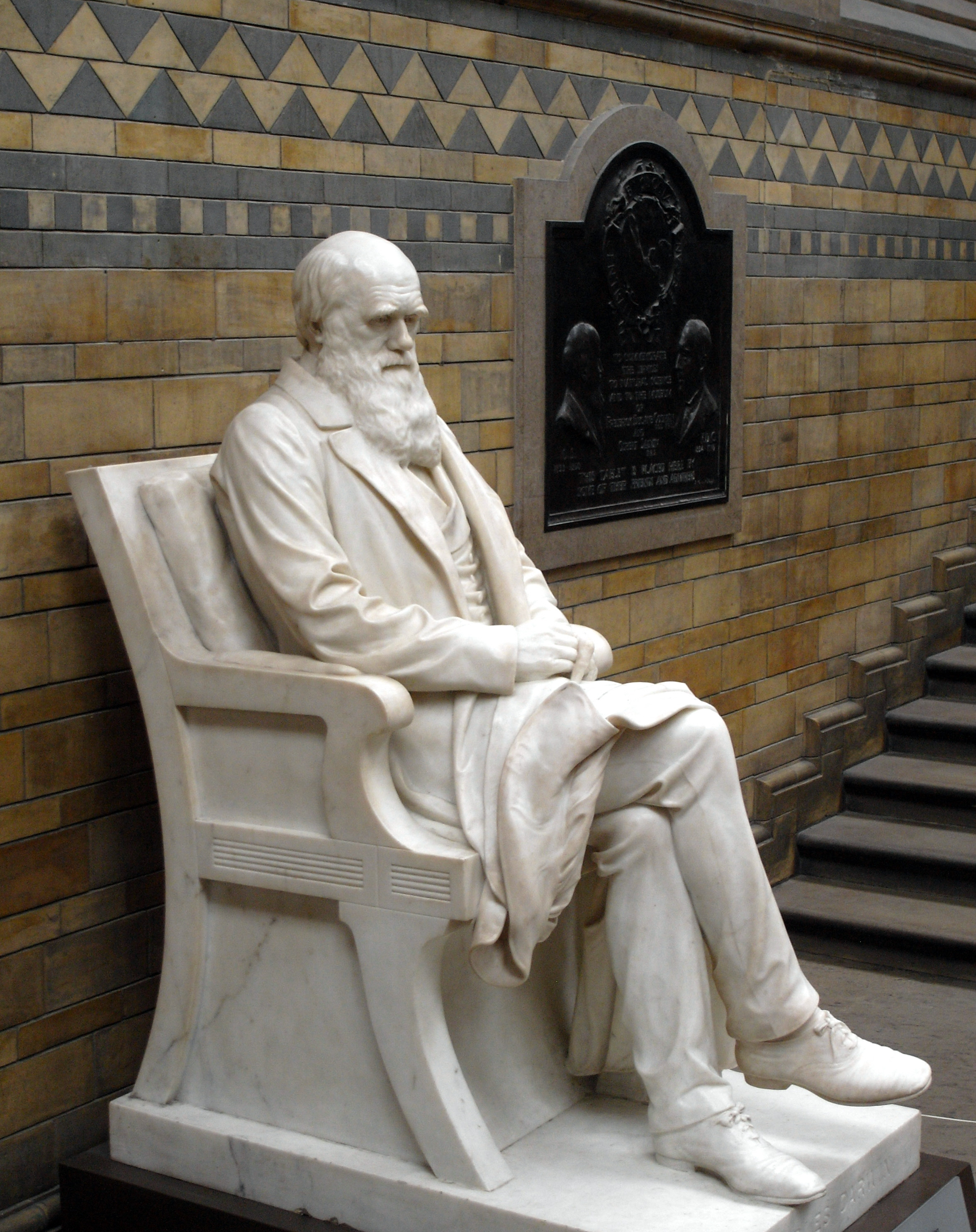
Statue of Darwin in the Natural History Museum

In 1884, on the retirement of Sir Richard Owen, he was appointed to the directorship of what were then the Natural History departments of the British Museum in South Kensington. The four departments of Zoology, Botany, Mineralogy and Geology each had its own Keeper, who was largely autonomous from the Director, who was himself subject to the Principal Librarian and to the Trustees of the British Museum. He had faced a wide array of personalities to contend with and various administrative duties in his career.

In 1889 he showed his devotion by installing a statue of Charles Darwin in the Museum. In that year he was chosen as President of the British Association for the Advancement of Science, having previously headed its biological section in 1878 and its anthropological section in 1881 (being chosen again in 1894). In 1893 he served as President of the Museums Association.

In 1895, in addition to his role as Director he took over the post of Keeper of Zoology, holding it until his retirement. He immediately set about rearranging the zoological galleries according to the theories he had evolved on effective presentation by de-cluttering the exhibits, ensuring each specimen had an easy-to-read label, and placing each stuffed animal beside its skeleton and remains of its extinct allies in order to give the displays depth and context.

== Other contributions to knowledge ==
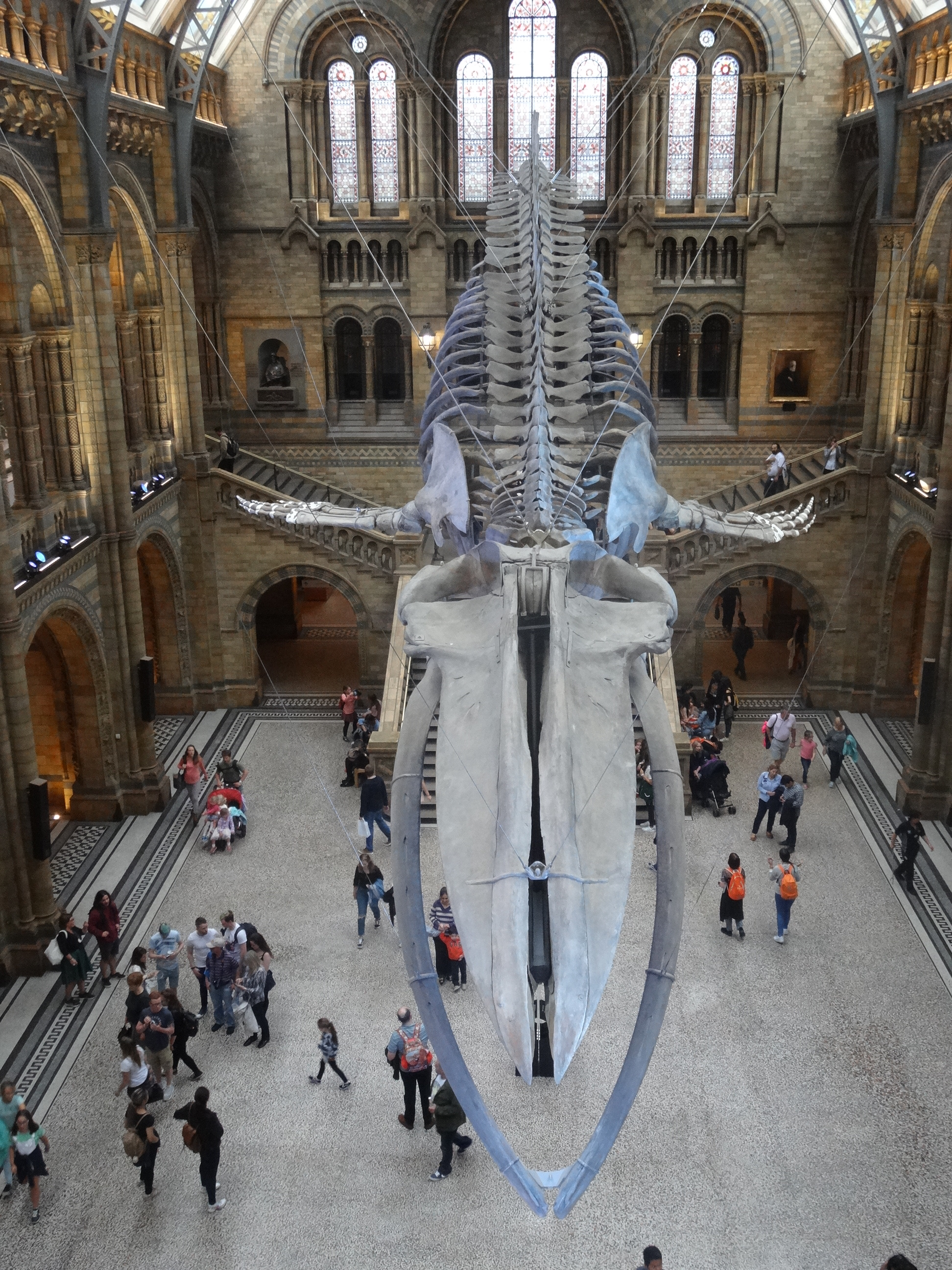
Blue whale skeleton in the Natural History Museum

Beyond his continuing interest in primates, he became an expert on the Cetacea, that is the whales and their relatives. He carried out dissections, went out on whaling boats, studied discoveries of whale fossils, and established a whale room at the Natural History Museum with skeletons and plaster casts. It was he who made public the "absolute and complete destruction of two species of right whale by the reckless greed of the whalers".

He made valuable contributions to structural anthropology, for example by publishing complete and accurate measurements of 1,300 human skulls, and as a comparative anatomist in the field of Mammalia he ranked high. He was the first person to show that lemurs are primates.

He was a leading authority on the arrangement of museums. He insisted on the importance of distinguishing between collections intended for the use of specialists and those designed for the instruction of the general public, pointing out that it was as futile to present to the former a number of merely typical forms as to provide the latter with a long series of specimens differing only in the most minute details. His ideas, which were largely and successfully applied to the museums of which he had charge, gained wide approval and entitle him to be seen as a reformer who did much to improve methods of museum arrangement and management.

He also laboured for wider access to museums, both by educated people who needed to know more about the rapidly developing world of science and by ordinary people whose mental horizons could be expanded. He personally led conducted tours for groups across the social spectrum, from royalty at one end to working men at the other.

He became a public figure, his lectures being crowded and his views influential. In a study of deliberate deformation of the human body in various cultures, he included corsets and high heels, illustrating the effects with pictures of distorted female skeletons. Horrified at the widespread slaughter of birds to provide feathers for fashionable hats, he said of the egret: "one of the most beautiful of birds is being swept off the face of the earth under circumstances of peculiar cruelty, to minister to a passing fashion." Which led Beatrix Potter to write: "I wonder what Sir W Flower's speciality is besides ladies' bonnets."

In 1869, he was elected as a member of the American Philosophical Society.

== Family and personal life ==
Flower married Georgiana Rosetta Smyth, on 15 April 1858, at Stone in Buckinghamshire. Georgiana was the youngest daughter of Admiral William Henry Smyth, an astronomer and hydrographer, and his wife Eliza Anne (Annarella) Warington. Flower and Georgiana had four daughters and three sons, including the zoologist Stanley Smyth Flower (1871‍–‍1946). He and his wife led an active life outside his work, over the years meeting many leading figures in British society. Among their friends were the poet laureate Alfred, Lord Tennyson and the leading churchman Dean Stanley.

Having been created a Companion of the Bath in 1887, three years after his first appointment to the Museum, he was appointed Knight Commander of the Order of the Bath (KCB) in 1892. He also received the Jubilee Medal and the Royal Prussian order "Pour le Mérite".

Illness and overwork led him to take retirement from the Natural History Museum in August 1898 and he died at his home in South Kensington on I July 1899, aged 67. His remains were buried with his wife's family at Stone in Buckinghamshire.

== Publications ==
Flowers publications were all but a few on mammals (and surgery); he was not a field biologist, nor a student of the other vertebrate groups.

- Flower, William Henry (1859). "On the importance of a knowledge of the elements of practical surgery to naval and military officers". Journal of the United Service Institution. iii: 1–11. OCLC 969472933, 4804948344.
- Diagrams of the nerves of the human body. London 1861.
- 'Observations of the posterior lobes of the cerebrum of the Quadrumana, with a description of the brain of a Galago'. Proc Roy Soc. 1860–62 xi, 376–81, 508; Phil Trans 1862 185–201.
- 'Notes on the anatomy of Lithecia Monachus (Geoff.).' Proceedings of the Zoological Society of London, 9 December 1862 1–8
- 'On the brain of the Javan Loris (Stenops javenicus).' Read 1862, publ. Zool Soc Trans 1866 103–111.
- 'On the brain of the Siamang (Hylobatis syndactylis).' Nat Hist Rev 1863 279–257.
- 'Notes on the skeletons of whales in the principal museums of Holland and Belgium, with descriptions of two species apparently new to science.' Proceedings of the Zoological Society of London, 8 November 1864 384–420.
- An introduction to the osteology of the Mammalia. London 1870; 2nd ed 1876; 3rd ed with Hans Gadow 1883. An introduction to the osteology of the mammalia (1885)
- 'On the brain of the red Howling Monkey (Mycetes seniculus).' Zool Soc Proc 1864 335–338.
- Fashion in deformity. 1885.
- The Horse: a study in natural history. 1890.
- Introduction to the study of Mammals, living and extinct with Richard Lydekker. London 1891.
- Essays on Museums and other subjects. London: Macmillan. 1898. (Includes appreciations of Huxley and Owen)

Flower wrote forty articles for the 9th edition of Encyclopædia Britannica, every one on a group of mammals.

== Honors ==
In 1895, Flower was named an honorary member of the American Association for Anatomy. and in 1889 he was awarded honorary membership of the Manchester Literary and Philosophical Society.

== See also ==
- "The New Museum Idea"
