= B. O. Flower =

American journalist (1858-1918)

Benjamin Orange Flower
- Born: October 19, 1858; Albion, Illinois, United States
- Died: December 24, 1918 (aged 60); Boston, Massachusetts, United States
- Other name: B. O. Flower
- Education: Kentucky University
- Occupations: Journalist, author
- Known for: Muckraking journalism, founder of The Arena
- Spouse: Hattie Cloud
- Parent(s): Alfred Flower, Elizabeth Flower

Signature
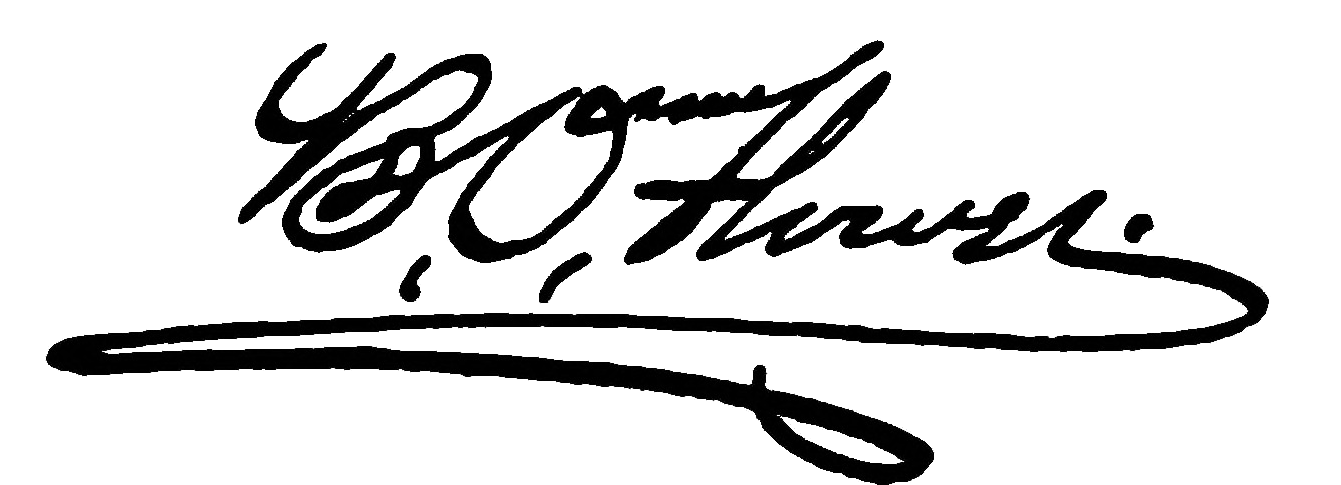

Benjamin Orange Flower (October 19, 1858 – December 24, 1918), known most commonly by his initials "B.O.", was an American muckraking journalist of the Progressive Era. Flower is best remembered as the editor of the liberal commentary magazine The Arena, published in Boston, New York City, and Trenton, New Jersey by the Arena Publishing Co. from 1889 until 1909.

== Biography ==
=== Early life and education ===
Benjamin Orange Flower was born in Albion, Illinois, on October 19, 1858, the son of Alfred Flower, a Disciples of Christ minister, and his wife Elizabeth, née Orange. His grandfather George Flower had emigrated from England with his friend Morris Birkbeck after speaking with Edward Coles, and with their followers founded the English settlement in the Illinois Territory. Benjamin Flower was first educated in a religious school in Albion before moving with his family to Evansville, Indiana, where he attended the public high school.

Following his high school graduation, Flower wished to become a Protestant minister, like his father and an older brother before him. He thus began studies at the Disciples of Christ's School of the Bible at Transylvania University in Lexington. Flower's religious and philosophical views evolved, however. He embraced Unitarianism and abandoned his religious career.

== Early career ==
After college, Flower returned to Albion where he launched a short-lived journal, the Albion American Sentinel, which was terminated in 1880. He then moved to Philadelphia, where he worked for a time as a secretary for his brother, a physician who operated a successful mail-order business.

In September 1886, B.O. Flower married Hattie Cloud of Evansville, Indiana. His wife was soon stricken with mental illness which forced her permanent institutionalization.

=== The Arena ===
Cover of The Arena, issue no. 223, dated June 1908

In 1886, Flower's brother opened a sanatorium in Boston and moved there with him. At this time, Flower returned to the world of publishing, launching a new literary magazine called The American Spectator. This venture proved successful, achieving a circulation of more than 10,000 copies within three years. In December 1889, Flower merged this publication into a new social reform magazine he launched called The Arena.

Flower was an advocate of bolstering public morality as a means of social improvement. In 1893, he proposed the establishment of a "League of Love" or "Federation of Justice" to better mobilize progressive-minded individuals for the betterment of humanity. This effort led to the formation of a new organization called the Union for Practical Progress, which attempted to establish itself on a national basis through the organization of local clubs. Local groups such as the Baltimore Union for Public Good received favorable coverage of their activities and publicity in The Arena. This effort failed to achieve critical mass and soon failed, however.

The Arena was an eclectic magazine, its pages open to writers of a wide range of ideological perspectives, ranging from advocates of cooperatives and populists to philosophical anarchists, socialists, and devotees of Henry George and the Single Tax. Uniting it all was Flower's evolutionary rather than revolutionary view of social change and his deep-seated faith in the perfectibility of mankind through enlightenment about the world and reasoned response to its problems. Flower advocated for kindergartens, libraries, and improved housing. He criticized ostentatious, costly, and encumbering women's clothing, "materialistic commercialism", and the wealthy class which monopolized society's economic resources.

The magazine consistently advocated for initiative and referendum, for prison reform, against capital punishment, and for the prohibition of alcohol. Multiple articles were dedicated to women's suffrage, reform of divorce law, the relationship between poverty and crime, and race relations between the white and black populations of the United States.

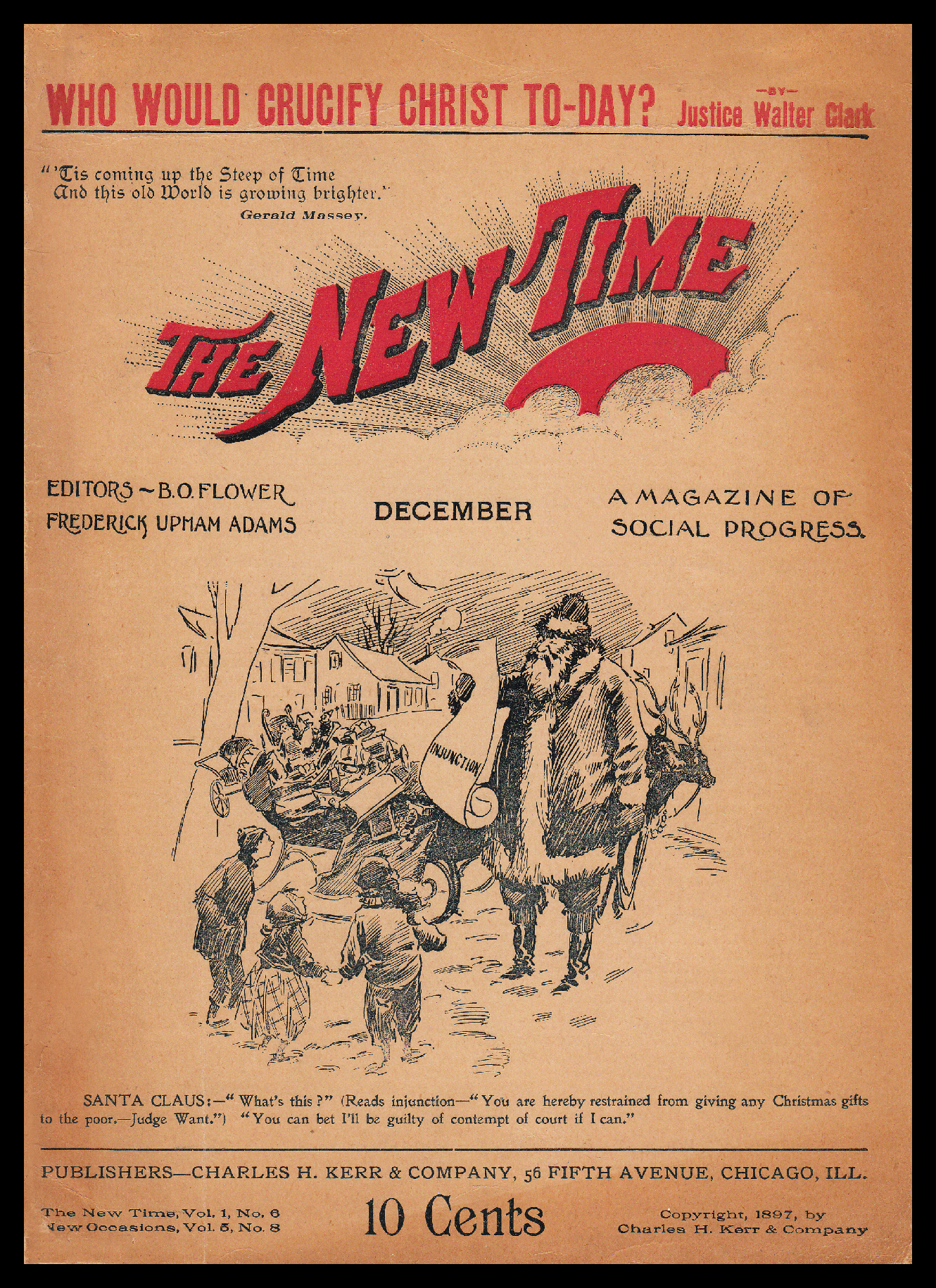
Flower briefly served as co-editor of the social reform magazine, The New Time, until its demise in 1898.

Long an advocate of free silver and currency reform, Flower came out strongly for the candidacy of William Jennings Bryan during the heated United States presidential election of 1896. Flower portrayed Bryan as the defender of freedom, prosperity, and the Republic. Flower urged Arena readers to support Bryan as the last best chance to stave off encroaching plutocracy in America. The year 1896 marked the end of Flower's first stint at the helm of The Arena, with the magazine being transferred to the editorship of historian John Clark Ridpath and the writer Helen Hamilton Gardener. Under its new editors, Flower's magazine continued to pursue the same political and ethical mission originally envisioned by its founder. Flower continued to contribute articles to the journal regularly throughout the subsequent interval.

From the latter part of the 1890s and into the first decade of the 20th century, Flower was associated with a number of radical reform magazines. He was the co-editor of former Unitarian Charles H. Kerr's Chicago magazine The New Time — a forerunner of International Socialist Review — from 1897 to 1898, working with Frederick Upham Adams. He then edited the St. Louis, Missouri-based magazine The Coming Age, moving it to Boston where it merged with The Arena in 1900.

The Arena was sold in 1903 to Charles A. Montgomery, a short-lived ownership situation which abruptly ended in 1904 with the magazine's sale to book publisher Albert Brandt. Upon purchasing the magazine, Brandt immediately brought back Flower as Editor-in-Chief of the publication that the latter had founded fifteen years before. Flower would remain in this position until the journal went bankrupt in 1909.

=== Political philosophy ===
As has been noted by the historian Louis Filler, B.O. Flower did not consider himself a socialist. Flower believed that the body of socialist ideas was thoroughly utopian and unachievable, and that revolution would result only in chaos and destruction. Instead, Flower advocated for a "neo-Christianity" based upon the re-establishment of personal character, and the rejection of greed and inequality and its propagation by self-interested men of wealth and their political adjutants. Direct democracy was seen by Flower as the path to spreading freedom and opportunity to the greatest number of Americans.

Social ills were not to be dismissed or ignored however, Flower believed, but rather were matters to be addressed forthrightly, with a broad range of opinions solicited in the process of bringing about their rational solution. Monopolies and monied interests promoting the sale and use of alcohol were seen as impediments to the morally based rectification of fundamental problems.

=== Christian Science ===
One particularly heated topic during the first decade of the 1900s was Christian Science, a Christian religious movement founded by Mary Baker Eddy, which had come under attack in a lengthy series of exposés in McClure's Magazine in 1907. Flower spoke in defense of the Christian Science movement, charging that the Christian Scientists were the objects of a "persistent campaign of falsehood, slander and calumny."

Further moved by his self-proclaimed love of "fair play and all things that make for a nobler and purer life", Flower would publish Christian Science As a Religious Belief and a Therapeutic Agent, a book defending Christian Scientist practice in 1910, though he was not himself personally an adherent of the sect. Although initially a skeptic, Flower made note of anecdotal evidence of cases of illness cured through Christian Science-based treatment, which had baffled the medical practitioners of the day. Flower thus lent support to this growing Christian Science movement.

=== Later years, death, and legacy ===
Following the demise of The Arena, Flower launched a new publication in Boston dedicated to social reform called Twentieth-Century Magazine. This magazine proved short-lived, terminating in 1911.

B.O. Flower died on December 24, 1918. He was 60 years old at the time of his death. Although Flower or his heirs destroyed many of his personal papers, some (mostly articles for publication) are with his family's papers at Knox College in Illinois.

Flower was posthumously recognized for his leading place among the muckraking journalists of the Progressive era. In 1932, historian C. C. Regier remembered him as a man who "somewhat naively...believed that if people would but see the evil effects of their acts they would themselves mend their ways", a philosophy which led to upbeat and optimistic editorial tone in Flower's work. Flower was also recalled as one who was "sensitive to beauty in any form, loved painting, sculpture, and literature, and always kept flowers in his office."

== Works ==
- Fashion's Slaves. Boston: Arena Publishing Co., 1892.
- Civilization's Inferno; or, Studies in the Social Cellar. Boston: Arena Publishing Co., 1893.
- Gerald Massey: Poet, Prophet, and Mystic. Boston: Arena Publishing Co., 1895.
- Whittier: Prophet, Seer and Man. Boston: Arena Publishing Co., 1896.
- The Century of Sir Thomas More. Boston: Arena Publishing Co., 1896.
- Persons, Places and Ideas: Miscellaneous Essays. Boston: Arena Publishing Co., 1896.
- How England Averted a Revolution of Force: A Survey of the Social Agitation of the First Ten Years of Queen Victoria's Reign. Trenton, NJ: Albert Brandt, 1903.
- In Defense of Free Speech: Five Essays from the Arena. New York: The Free Speech League, 1908.
- How England Averted a Revolution of Force: A Survey of the Social Agitation of the First Ten Years of Queen Victoria's Reign. Trenton, NJ: Albert Brandt, Publisher, 1909.
- Christian Science as a Religious Belief and a Therapeutic Agent. Boston: Twentieth Century Co., 1910.
- The Bubonic Plague. New York: National League for Medical Freedom, 1910.
- Progressive Men, Women, and Movements of the Past Twenty-Five Years. Boston: The Arena, 1914.
- Righting the People's Wrongs: A Lesson from History of Our Own Times. Cincinnati, OH: Standard Publishing Co., 1917.
