= Marden Hill =

Country house in Hertfordshire, England

Coordinates: 51.8099°N 0.1456°W

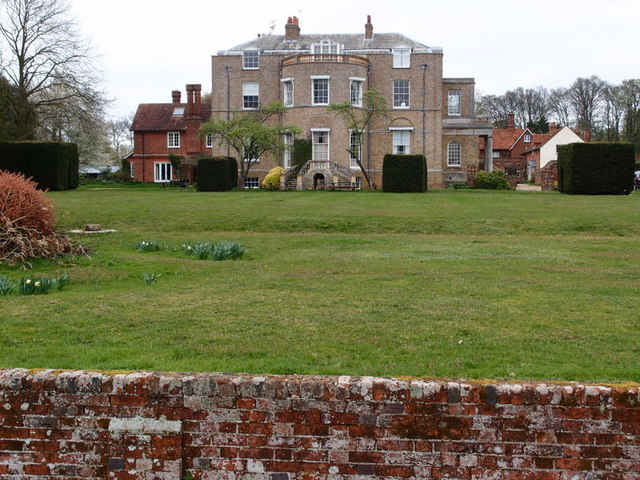
Marden Hill House

Marden Hill is a Grade II* listed country house close to the village of Tewin, Hertfordshire.

The house, originally Jacobean but substantially rebuilt in the 18th-century and modified in the 19th, is built in two storeys with attics of yellow brick with Portland stone dressings. The floor plan is square with five bays and a two-storey Ionic entrance porch at the front.

== History ==
In 1550, the Manor of Marden paid a rent of 26 ounces (740 g) of honey to the abbey of St Alban. Marden was held by the abbey until the dissolution, and in 1539 it was granted to William Cavendish. It came to Edward North, Master of the Harriers to Edward VI. In 1653 his grandson demolished the Elizabethan building and built a new house on the site, Marden Hill, high above the Mimram. After several owners, Robert Mackay demolished all but the present north wing in 1789 and it was redesigned in 1790-94 by Francis Carter retaining Jacobean fragments of the house.

It was bought by Richard Flower (the father of Edward Fordham Flower) and became the meeting place of many men of 'radical and dissenting opinion' including William Cobbett. Flower emigrated to the United States in 1817, hiring two ships at Liverpool to transport all his belongings. Flower subsequently helped found Albion, Illinois, and wrote on the English Settlement in the state.

The house was sold to Charles G. Thornton, who served as Governor of the Bank of England in the 1790s. Through his connection with the bank, Thornton knew the architect Sir John Soane, surveyor of the Bank of England since 1788, and commissioned him to extend the house. Soane's work for the Bank of England is largely destroyed but elements of that building were used in his designs for Marden Hill and still exist, particularly the Aztec-style cornices and the Ionic columns. He designed a vestibule and staircase, and also added the Ionic-columned two-storey porch that is a notable feature of the building.

In 1903 it came, at last, to be owned by the Cowper estate, and was leased. During World War II, it was occupied by a boarding school. The building was listed in 1952. In 1957 it was owned by a gravel extraction company, which was unable to demolish the building, and leased it to two architects, who signed a 21-year lease. A co-ownership company was formed, which now owns the freehold of Marden Hill. Nine families live there today.

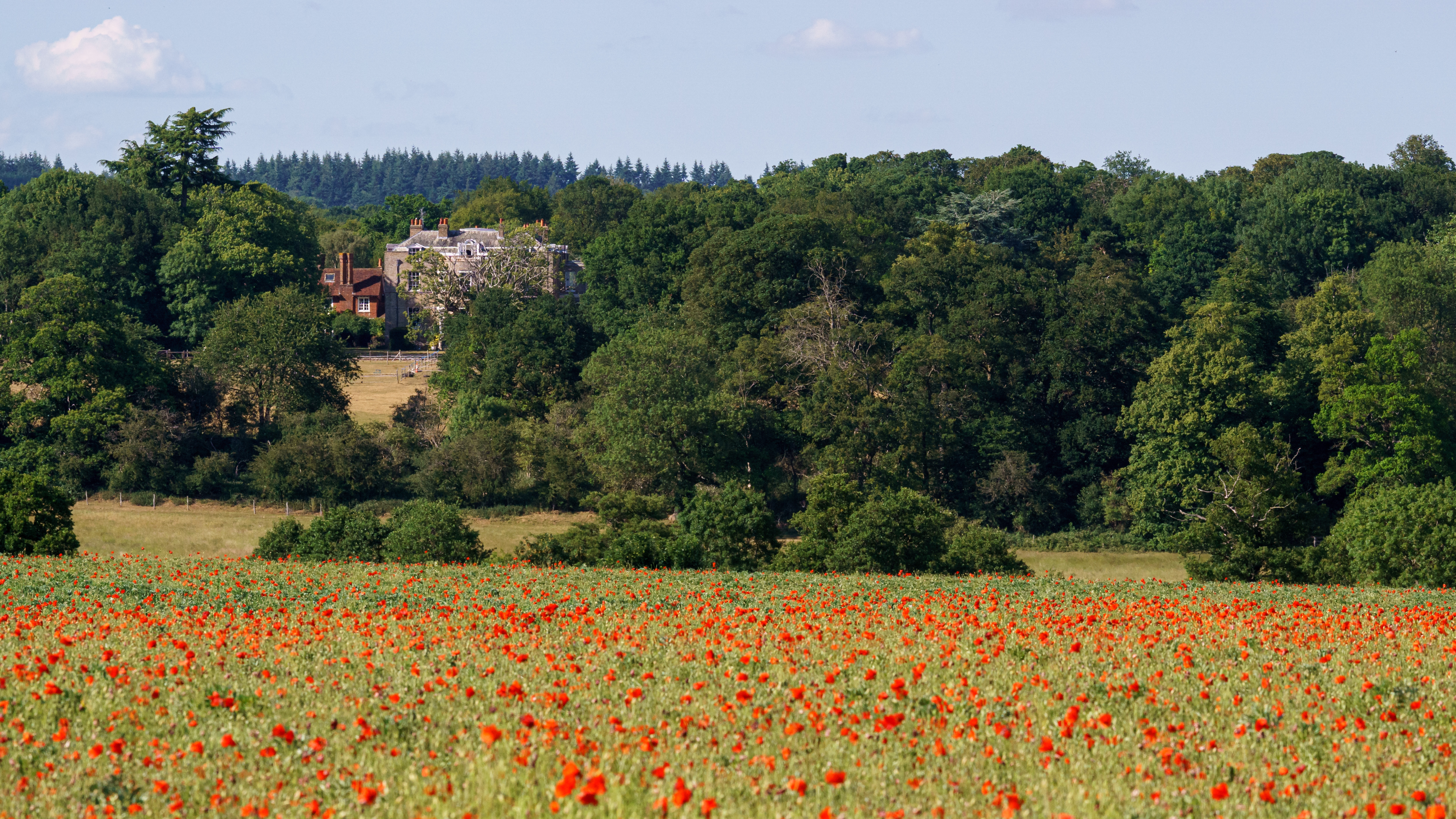
Marden Hill house from a poppy field near Panshanger
