= Indian commerce with early English colonists and the early United States =

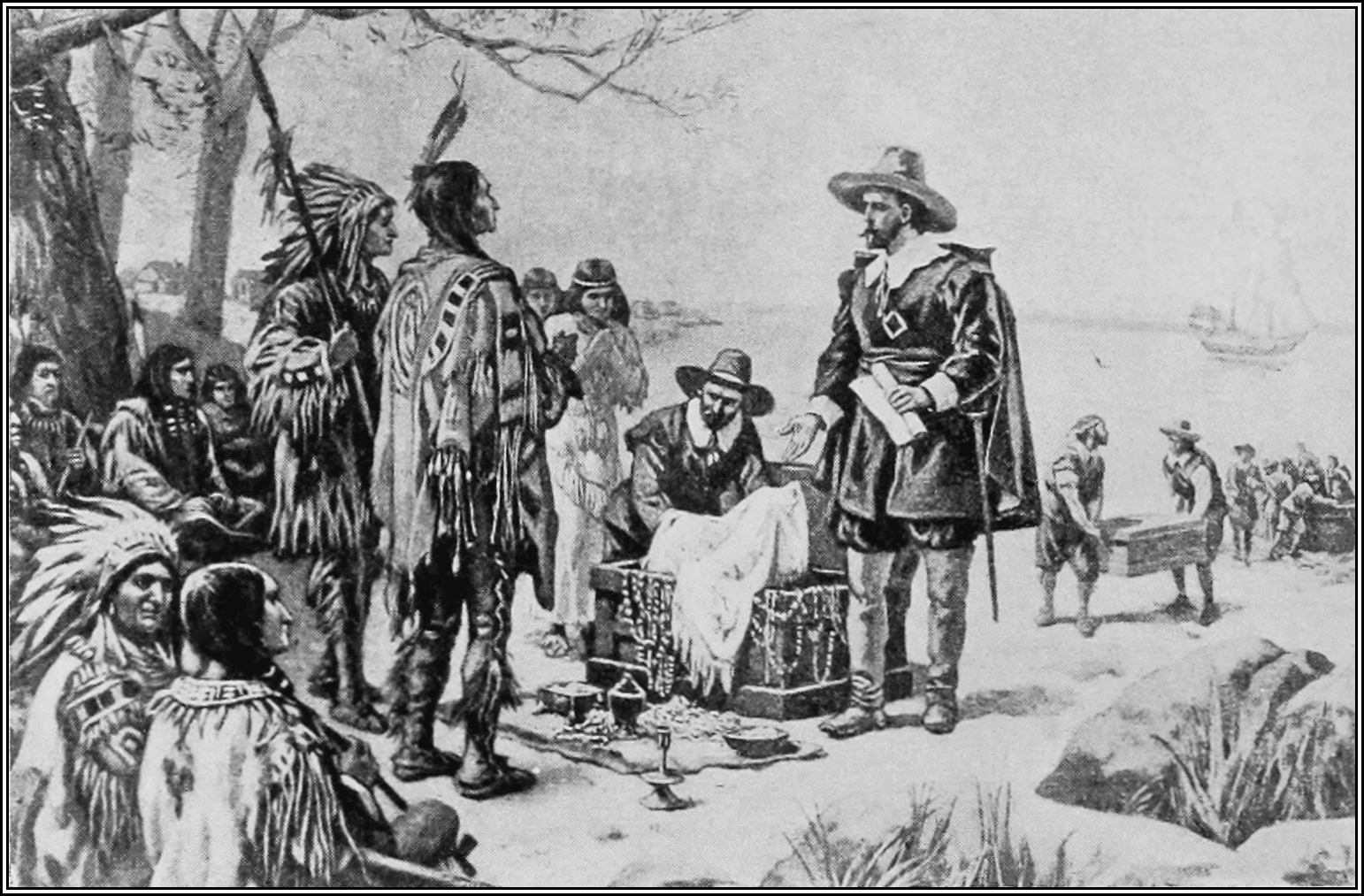
Purchase of Manhattan Island. Alfred Frederickson (1909)

Indian commercial development is defined as the economic evolution of Native American tribes from hunter-gatherer based societies into fur-trade-based industries. From the early 1500s to the 1800s, intertribal and European relationships evolved in response to the growth of English settlements into the United States.

The commercial relationship of each tribe was dependent upon its geographic resources and the cultural region it was a part of. Native American trade previous to European contact was limited to neighboring tribes as a method to emphasize tribal and social boundaries. The goods traded depended upon each tribes' specialization, but each tribe was non dependent upon external trade for survival. The development of trade between European traders and native tribes led to native tribes to specialize in fur trade in exchange for European goods.

Economic contact between Native Americans and English settlers began in the 16th century and lasted until the 19th century. Early relationship between the English and local tribes were dependent upon the animal furs and pelts. Initial English settlement such as Jamestown and Plymouth depended on local tribes for a large portion of their livelihood. As settlements became colonies, conflict steadily rose between both parties as English colonists occupied more lands and territories.

With the notable population growth of English colonies, dependence upon tribal goods dissipated. Indian tribes of the North Eastern woodlands became increasingly dependent upon colonial goods. By the time of the foundation of the United States, the importance of tribal commerce was in decline.

The steady expansion of the United States led to the disenfranchisement of Native Americans. Commercially, goods provided by Native Americans, such as furs, had lost significance in the American economy. Political agendas were created that led to the steady expulsion of Native American tribes which confined them to reservations in the West.

By the 1800s, Native American commercial power had all but diminished due to the subjugation of the United States government. Today, Native Americans satisfy commercial demand concerning gaming casinos and provided cultural goods.

== Pre-English settlement ==
From the outset of the sixteenth century, Native American societies are characterized as hunter-gatherer societies and horticulturalist societies. This era is classified as the Pre-Columbian Era. The specialization of each tribe was dependent upon the geographic factors of their territory. (E.g. North eastern tribes such as the Iroquois engaged in seasonal migration to hunt for moose and shellfish,) Previous to any European contact, many tribes focused their economies on the exploitation of furs. The first trade between finished European goods for Indian furs began in 1641 with French Jesuit priests in Great Lake region. This initial contact lead to the development of the fur trade, specifically beaver pelts, which paved the way for French and later English colonization.

Although European migration had a significant impact upon the economic development, it also impacted the social structure of tribes. The incoming migration led to the formation of federations and new tribes.

=== Native American pre-colonization commerce ===
Native American commerce was largely dependent upon the geography surrounding each of the tribes. These geographic areas came to find loose cultural boundaries which defined the economic structure of many tribes. General information for each region can be found here:

- North Eastern Woodlands
- Southeastern Woodlands
- Great Plains
- Great Basin
- Northwest Plateau
- Northwest Coast
- California
- Southwest

The exact nature of the trade pre-European contact is not known, but general inferences may be drawn. Trade was extensive between tribal communities since luxury goods such as copper, shells, and stone moved great distances. Trade of useful commodities such as perishable goods was limited to local neighboring tribes.

Trade between Native Americans was not directed towards profits. Trade had the function of providing communities with useful goods that they lacked, and served to reinforce social and territorial boundaries. Thus, goods processed as surplus in one community to another. An example of this is when the Huron's would trade surplus farm produce to the neighboring Algonkians.

The earliest trade relations with incoming European trades consisted of the trade of furs and agricultural goods in return for metals and cloth goods focused in the North Eastern Woodlands and Great Lakes area. The development led to the increased specialization of each tribe as the trade in furs for goods became increasingly beneficial for tribes. Consequences of the fur trade led to the depletion of beavers and exploitation of resources in the area. The exploration of Native American fur and labor from European trading companies began extensively in the time period between 1600s-1700s. (pg 25)

The development of the fur trade led to the establishment of firm social and political boundaries between tribes as well as the establishment of coalitions and confederacies between tribes. Popular confederations that came into existence in the 1630s are the Iroquois nation, the Pontiacs of 1760, and the coalition of Algonqian tribes which traded with the French in the great lakes region. These organizations developed purely as the product of the fur trade.

== Trade with English settlers ==
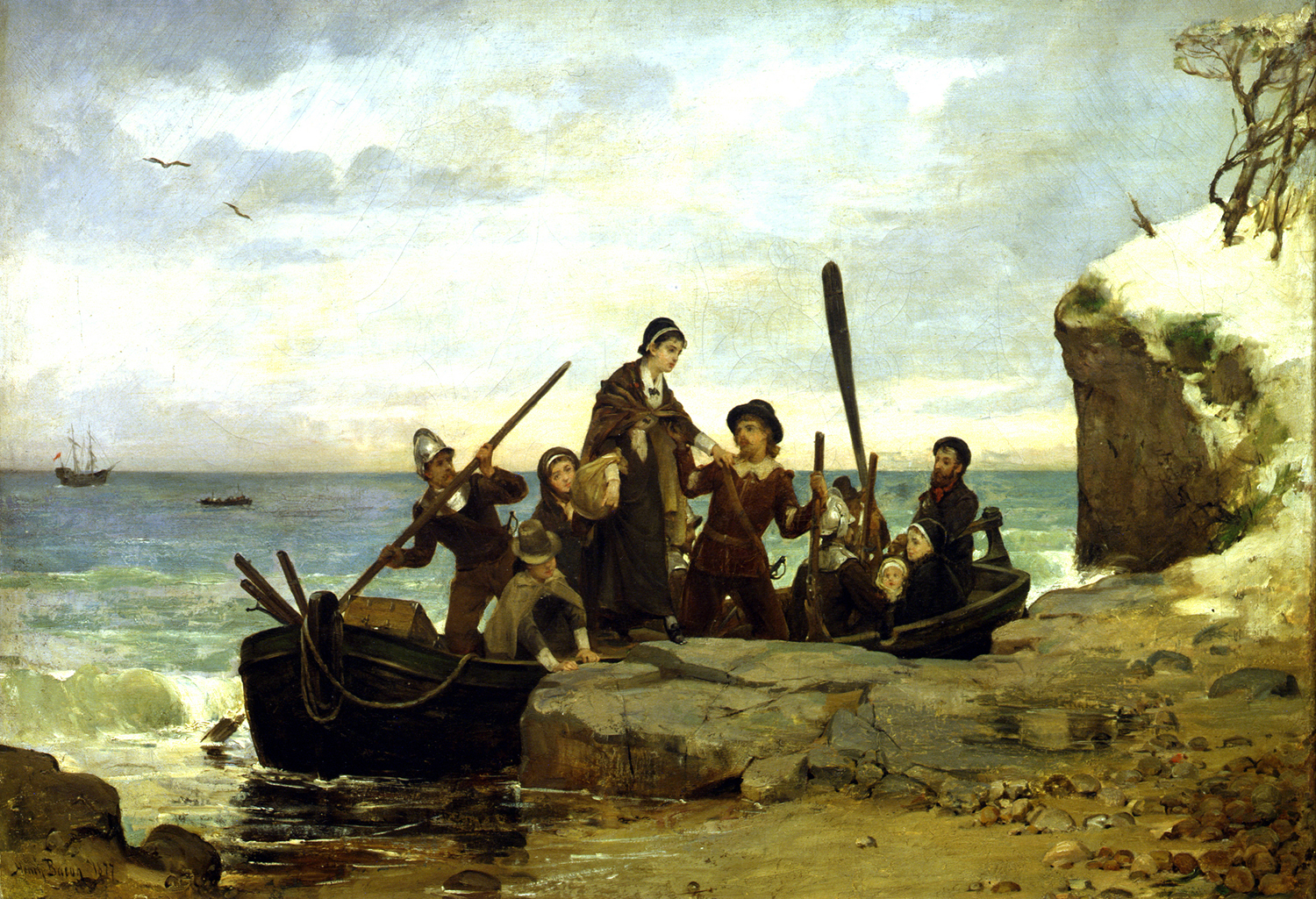
The Landing of the Pilgrims

As English settlers came to the New World trade took upon the role of peacekeeping and necessity for the English settlers. In order to have a functional and healthy relationship with the Native Americans in the United States at that time, the English would trade certain goods; such as food, spices, weapons, tools, etc. to the Indians in return to access to fertile lands, use of waterways, and even rough maps depicting the layout of the land. When trade was happening with the early settlers the overall relationship between the English Colonists and Native Americans was very healthy. The Indians could have been savage and harmful to the English, but they understood the trade relationship as a way to better both parties and British colonization of the Americas was more successful because of this. Major challenges occurred due to occasional exploitation of Native American goods by settlers. This led to a steady deterioration of commercial trust between Native tribes and settlers.

=== Plymouth and Northern Settlers ===
Plymouth (historically known as Plimouth and Plimoth) is a town in Plymouth County, Massachusetts, United States. Plymouth holds a place of great prominence in American history and is typically the most well known of the Northern Settlements. Plymouth was the site of the colony founded in 1620 by the Pilgrims, passengers of the famous ship the Mayflower. Before the arrival of the Mayflower earlier explorations killed between 90 and 95% of the local native inhabitants due to disease. The near disappearance of the tribe from the site not only left their cornfields and other cleared areas for the Pilgrims to take over, but also meant that the Indians were in no condition to disrupt the arrival of the colonists. With the dwindling numbers of Native Indians in the area they relied heavily on trade for subsistence and survival. They traded livestock for farming land and farming techniques. The overall relationship was good until the formation of Dominion of New England.

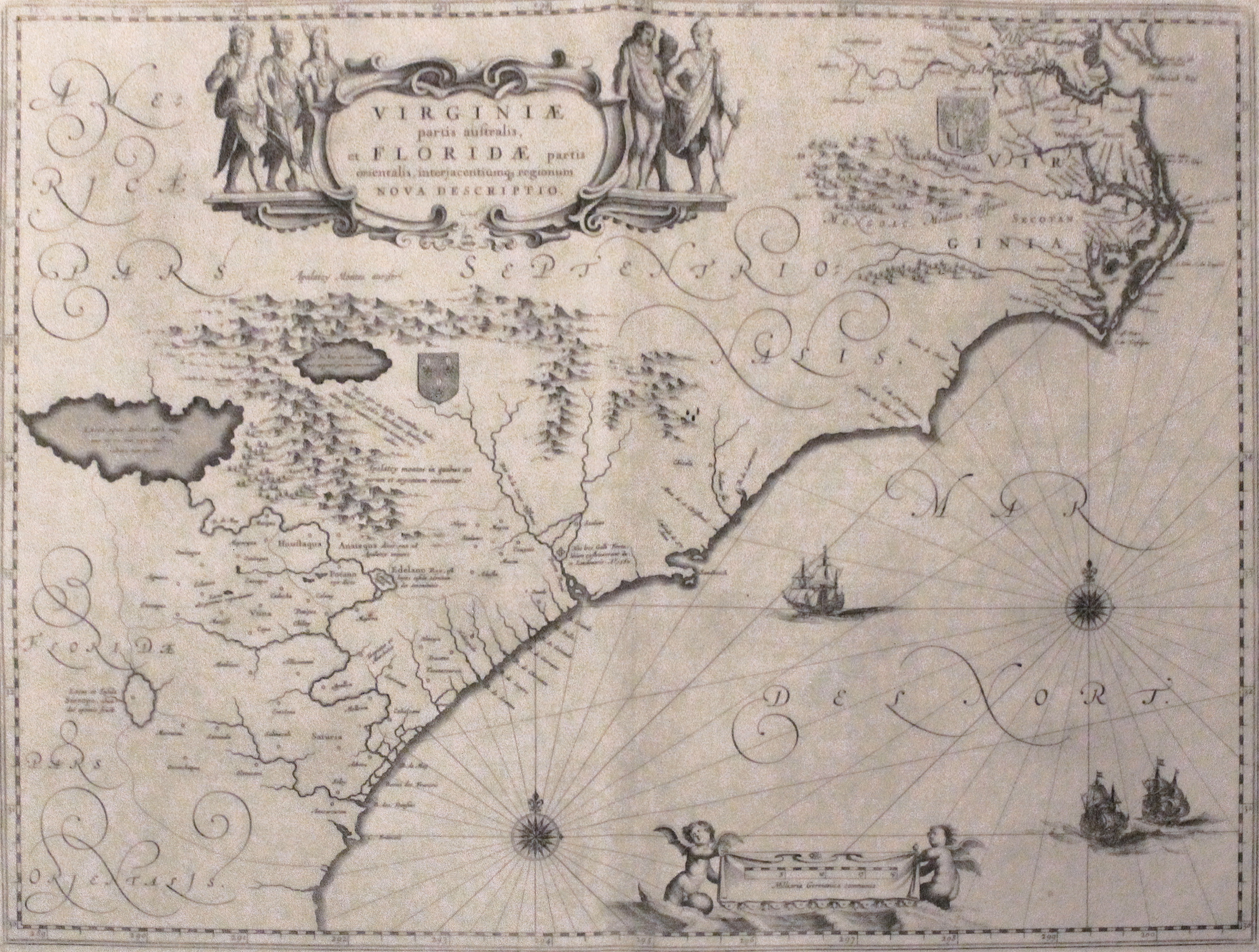
Map depicting the Colony of Virginia (according to the Second Charter). Made by Willem Blaeu between 1609 and 1638.

=== Jamestown and Southern settlers ===
Jamestown and Southern settlers relied very much on the Indians for almost all their food which the Indians gave gladly for the exchange of precious metal. The area where Jamestown was settled, was that it was not inhabited by nearby Virginian Indian tribes, who regarded the site as too poor and remote for agriculture. The island was swampy, isolated, offered limited space and was plagued by mosquitoes and polluted tidal river water unsuitable for drinking. Due to this agricultural products, building materials, and minimal livestock was traded from Indians to Jamestown and other southern settlements in close proximity for precious metals, glassware, tools, and other instruments the Indians were unfamiliar with. As other southern settlers left Jamestown and furthered the exploration in the area they were often welcomed by the Indians with dancing, feasting and tobacco ceremonies. As relationships developed in the southern areas so did the need for healthy trade. The Indians realized that these explorers were not just passing through but looking to colonize and further expand their living areas. After several years of strained coexistence, Chief Opchanacanough and his Powhatan Confederacy attempted to eliminate the English colony once and for all. On the morning of March 22, 1622, they attacked outlying plantations and communities up and down the James River in what became known as the Indian massacre of 1622. The attack killed over 300 settlers, about a third of the English-speaking population.

== Trade with English Colonies ==
English colonies became permanent fixtures in the New America, trade became all the more important to keeping civility with the Indians. For most of the Colonies established in the Eastern States as Indians realized their colonies were here to stay, the Englishman were often met with much resistance and even war. Large colonies that were growing quicker everyday were threatening to destroy much of precious land held by the Indians. Also with the increased population came foreign disease which spread quickly among Indian colonies. Trade became tense and limited during these times of sickness and disease. In some Indian history the white man became a hated person. The more successful trade routes between English colonists and Native Americans in the United States were from explorers and mappers, they were seen as less of a threat and would often spend several days inside Indian Territory in order to survive the harshness of the land.

=== Northern colonies (New England) ===
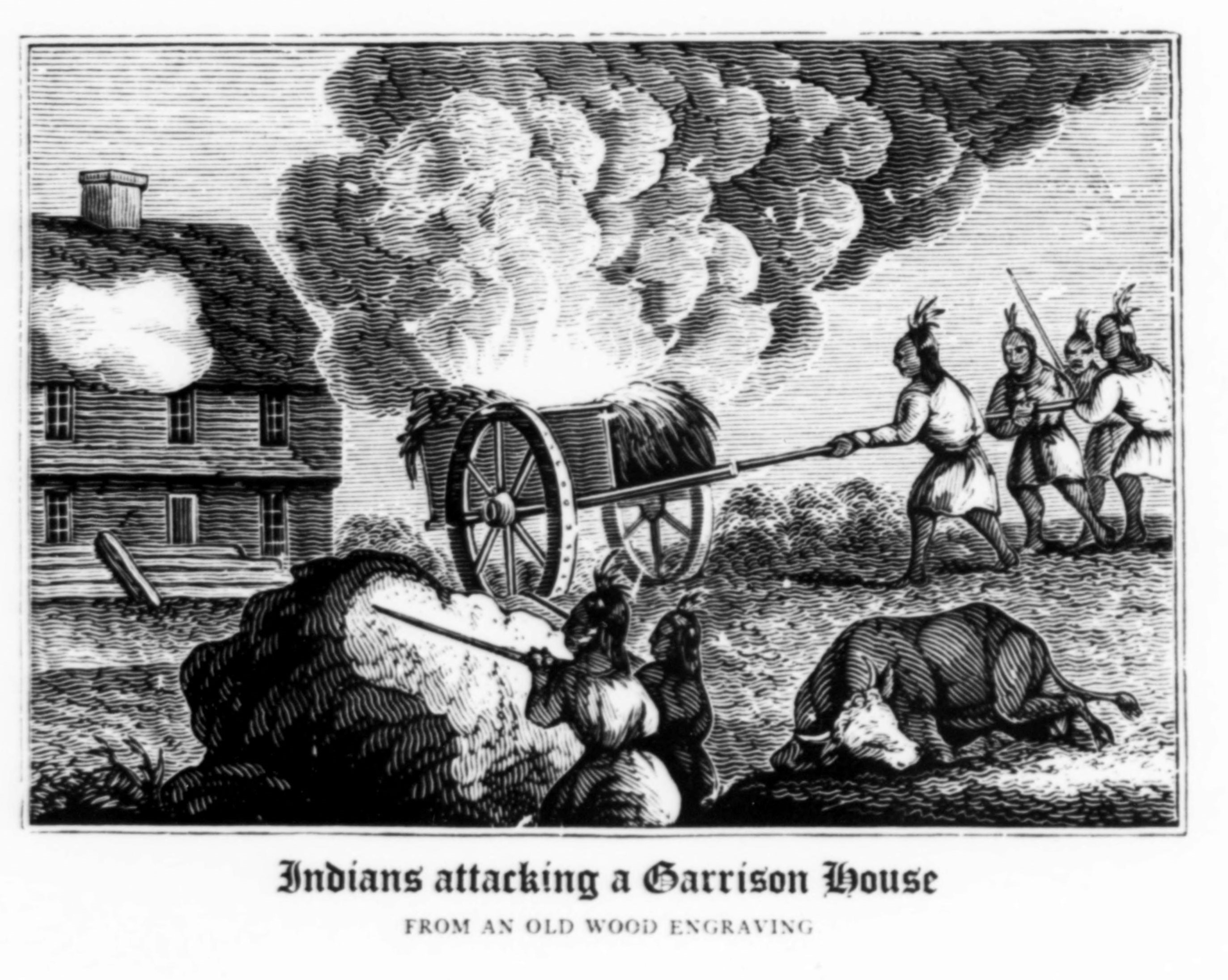
An artist's rendition of Native Americans attacking a garrison house in King Philip's War

Northern Colonies also known as The New England Colonies were made up of the colonies of Connecticut, Rhode Island, Providence Plantations, Massachusetts, and New Hampshire. They were part of the Thirteen Colonies. They were mostly associated with the fur trade when there was trading and primary traded with the Pequot Indians, but most relationships were fractured due to disease and land disputes eventually leading to King Phillip's War in 1675. This war was the single greatest war to occur in seventeenth century Puritan New England and is considered to be the deadliest war in the history of New England. King Philip's War began the development of a greater European American identity, which fractured almost all economic activity between English colonists and the Indians in the area.

=== Southern colonies ===
Indian trade in the southern colonies encompassed the regions of the Carolinas, Georgia, and Florida. The slave trade of Native Americans was common among southern colonies and Florida in the 1600s and early 1700s, but especially in the American Southeast. Most people associate Africans with the only people who were enslaved in the Americas however, in most of the southeastern colonies Native American slaves, at times, outnumbered those of African descent. Natives were sometimes used as labor on plantations or as servants. They were also used as interpreters for European traders. In many cases the colonists would trade with Native Americans; giving them goods and weapons, such as the musket, in exchange for beaver pelt and the capturing of other natives from rival tribes to be sold into slavery. This trade of slaves was not a very self-sustaining or an economic venture because either the native population was being wiped out and those who were not being killed or captured became the captors; and as the population of natives available for capture dwindled then the captors began to fall into debt with the colonists whom they were trading with. It was this debt and frustration that began the Yamasee War of 1715, which would ultimately be the demise of the trade system in the Carolina's.

=== The English traders ===
The English tradesman followed well established French trading routes throughout the Midwest Colonies traded for fur, tools such as buckets, axes, hammers, etc. They were usually welcomed by the Indians after these trade routes had been established, they often provided shelter, food, or even protection for other foreign Indian Tribes. As trading posts were established trade furthered with the tradesman and Indians. As traders pushed into new frontiers and unexplored areas of the New World, some resistance was met as they encountered new tribes.

== Trade with the early United States ==
The years following the formation of the United States, the US government began to regulate the trade industry with the Indian Intercourse Act, which was passed on July 22, 1790. For the first time, the United States regulated trade with the Native Americans. The government established an agency called The Bureau of Indian Affairs which was responsible for issuing licences to trade in the Indian Territory. Because of the increasing movement west in the United States, more and more Native Americans were being pushed off of their native lands and deeper into the Western United States. Wars continued to break out such as Tecumseh's War that was a conflict between the United States Army and a Native American confederacy and that ultimately developed into the War of 1812. These wars with the native population damaged relations between the Indians and the United States. During this time period large and small fur companies began to spring up across America. The American Fur Company, which was established in 1808, was one of the largest trading companies in the United States. As the 1800s continued on fur became less popular as the fashion trends began to shift. The Native American economy relied heavily on goods received from the fur trade and when it slowed they had to turn to other sources to continue receiving goods that they needed. The Native Americans began to sell off their land to settlers in oftentimes forced situations. These tense deals lead to future armed conflicts.

=== Trade with Southern Indians ===
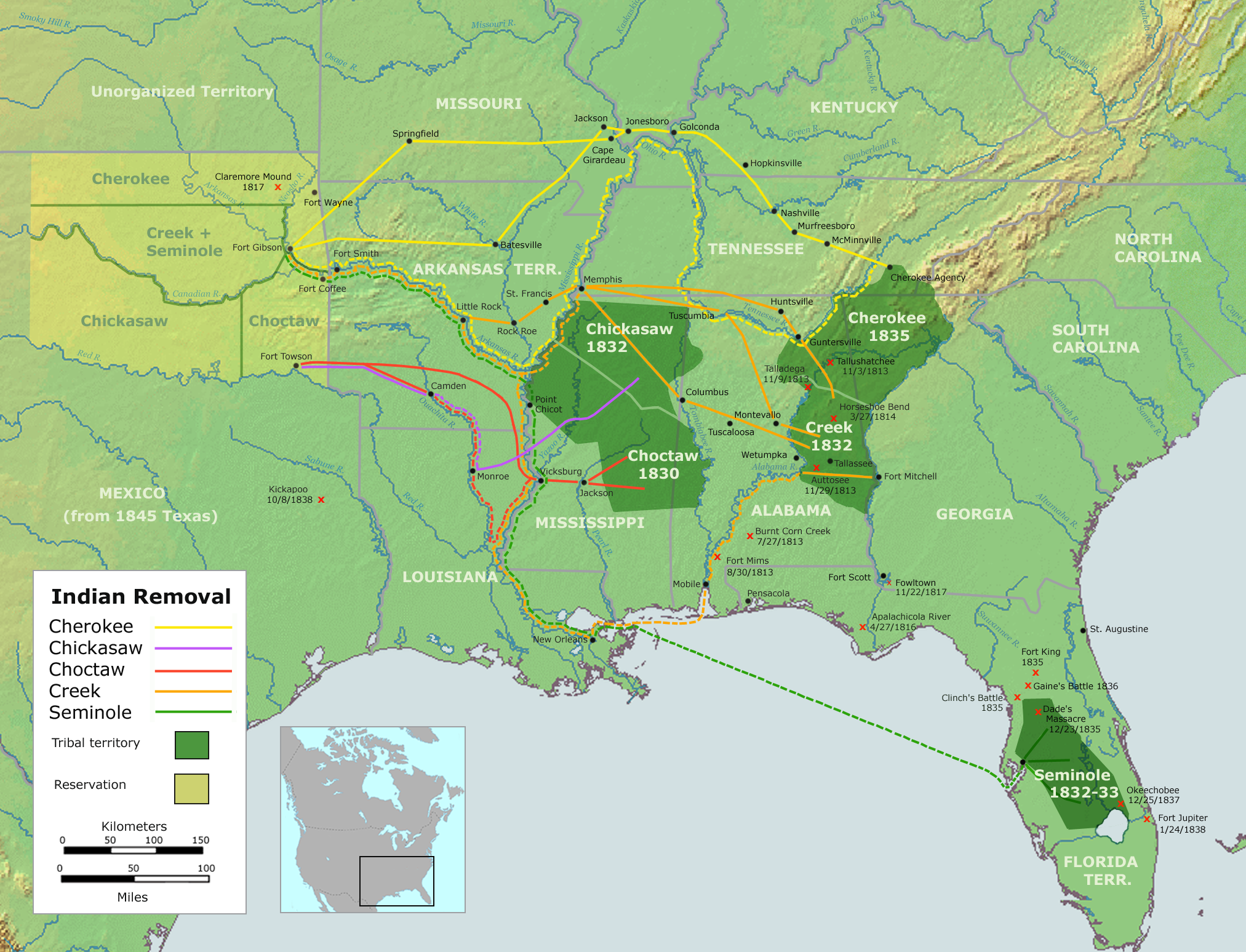
Map showing the displacement of Native Americans

Most of the Native American tribes of the south were forcefully relocated during the Indian Removal in the 1830s. These tribes were relocated to Indian Territory which was west of the Mississippi River. The Muscogee also known as the Creek were a Native American people located in the southeastern woodlands. This area consisted mostly of Oklahoma, Alabama, Georgia, and Florida. The Muscogee participated heavily in the deer skin trade. Their main hunting grounds were in Savannah and Florida. The Muscogee that were located more towards the south began to migrate into Florida and then later became known as the Seminoles. At the beginning of the 19th century conflicts between the Seminoles and white settlers became more frequent. By the end of the 19th century more than 3,000 Seminoles had been relocated and only an estimated 200 to 300 remained in Florida. Consequently, trade in the southern states came to a halt at the end of this era.

=== Trade with the West ===
In the early 1800s trade with Native Americans was already commonplace. Trade with the Native Americans in the mid-west states mostly consisted of beaver fur, and in return natives would receive horses, guns, and other commodities that they themselves could not produce. During the Indian Removal in this time, many tribes were pushed by the government into western states such as Kansas, Kentucky, and Missouri. The Shawnee was one such tribe that was pushed from Pennsylvania and into Ohio, Alabama, and Illinois. The Shawnee traded fur in exchange for rum or brandy. Alcohol abuse became a serious problem within the tribe.

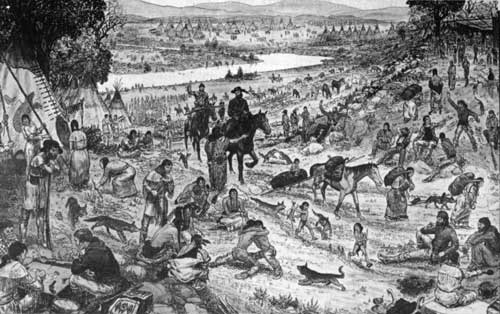
Annual rendezvous of Rocky Mountain trappers. Original sketch in Oregon Trail Museum.

Another tribe that heavily populated the southern plains region was the Comanche tribe. The Comanche were mostly farmers before the tribal conflicts over the fur trade that began due to the Europeans. After the fur wars, the Comanches were driven from eastern territories and into the bison hunting territory. By the nineteenth century, the Comanche tribe were mostly nomadic and relying heavily on the hunting of bison to sustain life. Bison fur was also traded with other tribes and with villagers located in the Missouri. Three other tribes that also participated in the bison trade with the Comanche were the Cheyenne, Kiowa and Arapahoes tribes. The four tribes constantly searched for prime buffalo grounds and horse herds that they could trade with the Missouri villagers and the horse reservoir that was located in the south.

One common source of trading that occurred in the west was through the Rocky Mountain Rendezvous. The Rendezvous was an annual gathering that took places over a variety of locations. Large fur companies such as the American Fur Company would put together mule trains that were loaded with commodities such as whiskey, ammunition, and other supplies that were necessary for life in the West. Native Americans were not the only ones to attend these rendezvouses, mountain men and trappers would also attend to trade their furs and hides. The Rendezvous was an opportunity for all traders to replenish supply. The rendezvous was an opportunity for trappers and traders to come together and share ideas and to socialize. Natives usually brought their entire families and were viewed as peculiar to the other attendees.

== Trade with the United States 1820-1870 ==
Conflict with the Native Americans steadily increased during this time period. The Manifest Destiny attitude of the United States government was reflected in their dealings with tribal nations. During this era, the Indian Removal Act of 1830 was passed, leading to the genocide of many eastern Indian tribes. The final treaty with Native Americans which was known as The End of Treating Making 1871 marked the end of government recognition of Indian tribes and introduced the creation of Indian reservations that continue to the modern day. This absolute disenfranchisement of Native Americans marked the end of any official trading with the United States.

=== Eastern United States ===
The 1830 Indian Removal Act, signed into law by President Andrew Jackson, authorized the president to grant unsettled lands west of the Mississippi River in exchange for Indian lands within existing state borders. Due to the Indian Removal Act of 1830, and the Second Seminole War, official trade of commercial goods on the East Coast concluded. By 1839 the Cherokee nation was forced to give up its land and migrate to present day Oklahoma. The Cherokee people called this the Trail of Tears due to its devastating affects which left 4,000 out of the 15,000 Cherokees dead.

=== Mid-West ===
In 1828 Fort Union, located in Upper Missouri was the chief establishment for most fur companies, lone traders like, Wyeth, Bonneville, Pilcher, Fontenelle made it competitive for established fur companies. In 1834 Fur trade was at its height, with half dozen organized companies in the United States competing with the American fur company which during this time had monopolize the fur trade industry in the United States by 1830. Fur companies competing with the American fur company were forced or found it useful to their advantage to utilize the wandering habits of the Indians, having only general rendezvous, most hunters were sent out in different directions. Not having storehouses, hunters would bury their furs until the annual caravan sent out to St. Louis.

=== Utah ===
The Ute nation and Paiutes experienced continuous conflict with the Mormon settlers whose lineage could be tracked to the English settlers. Although certain accommodations were arranged with the Mormon settlers, the occupation and abuse of resources and wildlife ultimately exhausted peaceful relationships between the Native Americans and Mormon settlers. The Mormons attempted to suppress the New Mexican trade; which resulted in the disruption of the Ute economy and society. On July 17, 1853, a catastrophic dispute between James Ivie and a couple of Ute members led to a disagreement, which eventually resulted in one of the Ute members being killed. This dispute and many more issues led to the Walker War.

=== California ===
The California gold rush was the start of genocide of Native Americans on the west coast. Miners, loggers and settlers formed vigilant groups to hunt Indians who were living outside the mission communities. In the year 1845, the population of Native Americans was estimated to be around 150,000 which decreased significantly to 30,000 by 1870. This massive decrease in the population was a result of life-threatening and contagious diseases, dwindling of wildlife and resources and constant persecution from the influx of new arrivals which included the English migrants and Europeans.

== United States legislation on commerce with Native Americans ==
=== Articles of Confederation ===
Under the Articles of Confederation, there was neither effectiveness nor efficiency when concerning the central government. Under the Articles, Congress didn't have political credibility to pass or enact legislation. For example, Congress didn't have the power to tax, only suggest or request money. This led to the consequence of insufficient funds to finance soldiers, bond holders, or regulate a currency. This affected Native Americans in the aspect that they had to go through various obstacles to trade or sell commodities. In addition, without a regulating currency, this could inflate prices on their goods and services. Also, different specie would make transactions more difficult. However, the Articles of Confederation granted regulated trade between the federal government and Native American tribes.

The Articles of Confederation lack of acknowledging interstate commerce resulted in unnecessary taxes and tariffs between states. This affected Native American commerce because they still had to pay taxes, but on a state-by-state basis, which potentially led to a discriminatory tax. Depending on the geographical region, some tribes had disputes and wars with colonists, which led to tense relations.

=== United States Constitution ===
Under the Articles of Confederation, there were no laws or regulations that gave Congress the power to regulate commerce. Thus, the states were in charge or monitoring their own commerce between other states. This proved to be difficult for Native American trading, for there was no unity between the states; each state was its own nation with their own set of rules and regulations, which added even more complications to how Indians were able to operate commerce transactions. However, the Confederation Congress spent a good deal of time and effort developing policies to keep peace between the white settlers and the Native Americans. To maintain peace between early colonies and Native Americans, the Confederation Congress were able to raise armies, as well as appoint liaisons to settle insurrections that would occur. Under the new Constitution, framers added the Commerce Clause:

(Article 1, Section 8, Clause 3): “To regulate Commerce with foreign Nations, and among the several States, and with the Indian Tribes;” The idea or intention of the framers were to regulate commerce between four forms of sovereignty: Native American tribes, foreign countries, states, and the federal government of the United States. The effects of Constitution ratifications gave more central authority to the federal government over Native Americans tribes through the Trade and Intercourse Acts, as well as Article II, Section 2, Clause 2 (Treaty Clause), and

Article IV, Section 3, Clause 2 (Property Clause):

The Congress shall have Power to dispose of and make all needful Rules and Regulations respecting the Territory or other Property belonging to the United States; and nothing in this Constitution shall be so construed as to Prejudice any Claims of the United States, or of any particular State.

Within the first decade of the ratification of the Constitution, Congress passed The Northwest Ordinance (1785) in the hope of raising federal revenue from the sale of Western land. Under this ordinance, there were demarcation lines of counties and townships up to the discretion of the governor:

Section 8. For the prevention of crimes and injuries, the laws to be adopted or made shall have force in all parts of the district, and for the execution of process, criminal and civil, the governor shall make proper divisions thereof; and he shall proceed from time to time as circumstances may require, to lay out the parts of the district in which the Indian titles shall have been extinguished, into counties and townships, subject, however, to such alterations as may thereafter be made by the legislature.

Section 14, Article III illustrates the ideal relationship between Native Americans and government:

Religion, morality, and knowledge, being necessary to good government and the happiness of mankind, schools and the means of education shall forever be encouraged. The utmost good faith shall always be observed towards the Indians; their lands and property shall never be taken from them without their consent; and, in their property, rights, and liberty, they shall never be invaded or disturbed, unless in just and lawful wars authorized by Congress; but laws founded in justice and humanity, shall from time to time be made for preventing wrongs being done to them, and for preserving peace and friendship with them.

=== Federal involvement ===
Johnson v. McIntosh proved that the new central government was in favor of sovereign property rights, by stating that private citizens could not purchase Native American land, and that the federal government has the sole right to negotiate with tribal nations.

Cherokee Nation v. Georgia was a case that stripped away of rights from Cherokee Nation due to the court arguing that the tribe had no original jurisdiction because they were a sovereign tribe. Supporters uphold this verdict under Article III of the Constitution.

Worcester v. Georgia argued the fundamentals of state government and established boundaries that ensured peace and privacy with the Cherokee Nation. In a 5-1 decision, the court argued in favor of Worcester that the state of Georgia does not have the authority to regulate the intercourse between citizens of its state and members of the Cherokee Nation.

In 1830, President Andrew Jackson enacted The Indian Removal Act, in which Native Americans east of the Mississippi were forced to move west of the Mississippi River. The logistics behind it were due to high demand of American settlers wanting to live there.
