= Palmyra, Edwards County, Illinois =

Coordinates: 38°28′09″N 87°45′38″W

Palmyra (1814–1821) was a town in the English Settlement, 2 miles (3.2 km) north of the town of Mount Carmel, Illinois, in what is today Wabash County. First settled in 1814, Palmyra was originally the site of a ferry across the Wabash River. Soon after the town was founded, a road was built between the settlement and the county line of Gallatin County, Illinois. It was named the first county seat of Edwards County, and meetings were held at the home of a resident. The peak population of the settlement was claimed to be between 500 and 600, though it is likely that these numbers are exaggerated. Epidemics of malaria and yellow fever killed a large portion of the settlement. By 1821, it was clear that the county seat had to be moved to a more stable town. On April 10, the Illinois General Assembly named Albion, Illinois, the new seat.
