= Elias Pym Fordham =

Elias Pym Fordham (1788-1850) was the original surveyor of Indianapolis. He was an English immigrant to the United States and author of an American travel memoir.

Elias Pym Fordham was born in Royston, Hertfordshire, one of two sons and seven children to Elias Fordham (1762-1838) and his first wife Ann Clapton. The family background was of liberal nonconformism in Hertfordshire, exemplified by his uncle Edward King Fordham. He studied civil engineering under George Stephenson (a developer of the steam locomotive).

Fordham immigrated to the US in 1817 with his sister Maria and travelled to Illinois where he purchased a tract of land in what was known as "the English Prairie", settled also by his first cousin George Flower (1788-1862), a founder of Albion, Illinois. In April 1821 he along with Alexander Ralston received joint appointments as surveyors of Indianapolis.

Little else is known of Fordham. He was well educated and articulate as evidenced by his Personal narrative of travels in Virginia, Maryland, Pennsylvania, Ohio, Indiana, Kentucky : and of a residence in the Illinois Territory: 1817-1818 which was not published until 1906 (now out of print). He eventually returned to England and continued working on projects with George Stephenson. On 16 Jul 1832 he obtained a licence to marry a widow, Priscilla Ebenezer Morris at Dover.

His death was listed in the Dover Telegraph as having occurred at age 62 on 19 October 1850 in Capel-le-Ferne. His will was proved on 14 December 1850, his wife surviving him.
