= Edward King Fordham =

English banker and political reformer (1750–1847)

Edward King Fordham (1750–1847) was an English banker and political reformer.

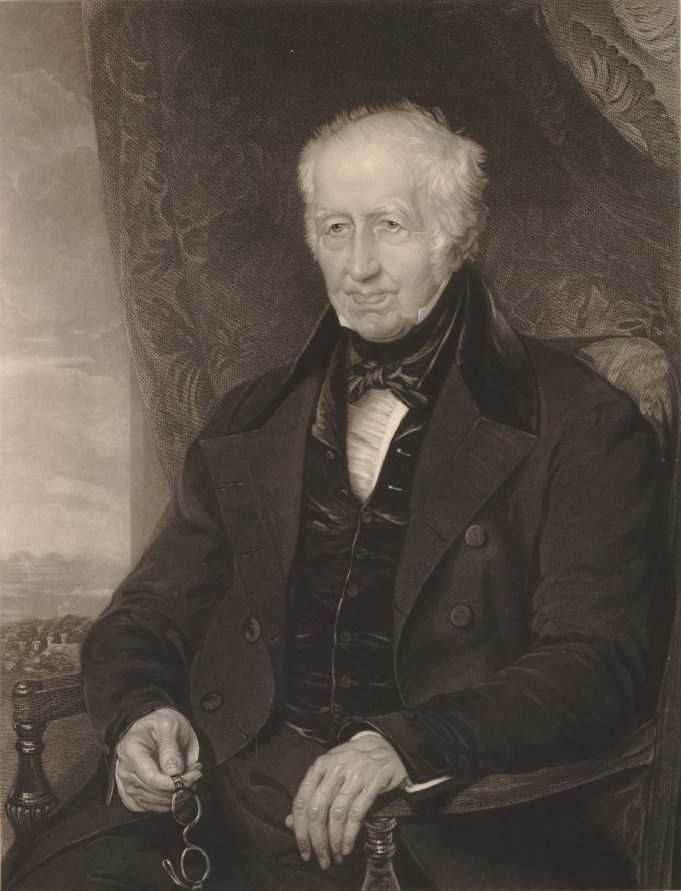
Edward King Fordham

== Career and the Royston Bank ==
The second son of Edward Fordham (1721–1778) of Therfield in Hertfordshire and his wife Mary Carter (1722–1798) he moved to Royston, the nearby town, while still a young man. In early life he worked as a woolcomber and stapler. He became prominent in business there, and a founder of the Royston Bank.

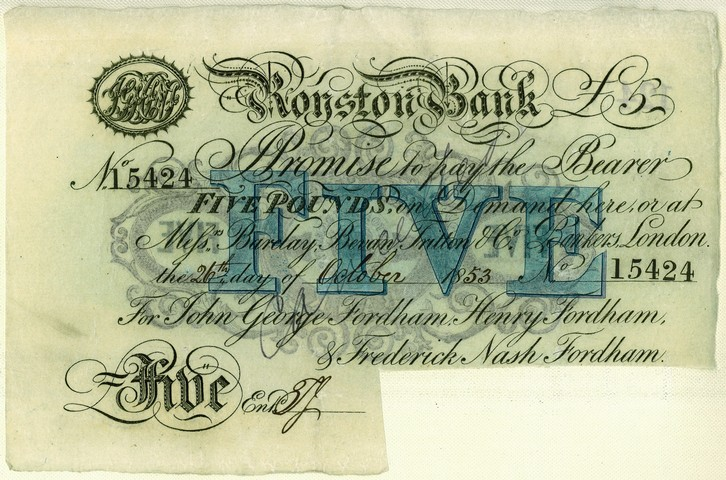
Cancelled banknote from the Royston Bank, 1853

The Royston Bank was set up in 1808, and traded under the name of Fordham, Flower & Co. In 1825 control passed within the Fordham family to John Edward Fordham (1799–1881), a nephew of Edward King Fordham, with John George Fordham (1780–1877), another nephew; John Edward ran the bank, then known as John Fordham & Co. The Royston Bank, then Fordham & Co., lost its independence in 1896 with the merger of a dozen banks to form Barclay & Co.

== The Fordhams as brewers ==
The family concern was brewing. Peter Mathias considers the practical operation of duties on maltsters and brewers made a step into finance, from retaining duty on malt, a natural one; though the Fordham family was one of only a handful who made it. Fordham's father Edward was in that business at Ashwell. It was however another Edward King Fordham (1810–1889) who in 1839 constructed a larger brewery at Ashwell. He was in partnership with his brother Oswald. He then built it up, attaching many pubs as tied houses, and it became the largest brewery in the area. It was sold to the Luton brewer J.W Green in 1953.

== The Fordhams and Hertfordshire politics ==
The younger George Fordham, a nephew of Edward King Fordham, was a follower of William Cobbett. In early 1822 a meeting was held to consider rural distress, and participants included Thomas Brand, 20th Baron Dacre, a Hertfordshire Whig MP to 1819, and William Lamb, then sitting as MP. In bitter exchanges, George Fordham required Lamb to strengthen a reform petition proposed by Dacre, by an amendment; Lamb declined to be instructed; and George's brother Edward made an ad hominem attack on Lamb. Sir John Sebright, the other sitting MP, also refused to be treated as a delegate. Edward King Fordham intervened, explaining that he concurred with the amendment, but also with Dacre's view that it should be withdrawn. He took the same line that his nephews as extreme reformers were being divisive at a meeting in 1823.

== Associations ==
From 1833 to shortly after Fordham's death, the minister at Royston's Unitarian chapel was Archibald Forbes Macdonald (1808–1886). Ruston believes that, almost certainly, Fordham was his major source of income. He was later known as an "advanced Radical".

== Family ==
Fordham was married in 1785, to Sarah Chantry (1756-1823), but died without surviving issue. A marble tablet to them was placed in Kelshall church.

With his brother George (1752-1840), Fordham bought the Odsey estate from William Cavendish, 5th Duke of Devonshire, in 1793. There were two other brothers, Elias (1762-1838) who became a Unitarian minister, and John (1747-1830); Elias Pym Fordham was the son of Elias Fordham and his wife Ann Clapton. Fordham also bought property at Sandon, Hertfordshire, some acquired via Elias.

Fordham's sister Elizabeth (1765-1846) married Richard Flower the brewer, brother of Benjamin Flower. Edward Fordham Flower was therefore Edward King Fordham's nephew. The younger Edward King Fordham of the later 19th century was a great-nephew.
