= Harold Huntley Bassett =

United States Air Force general

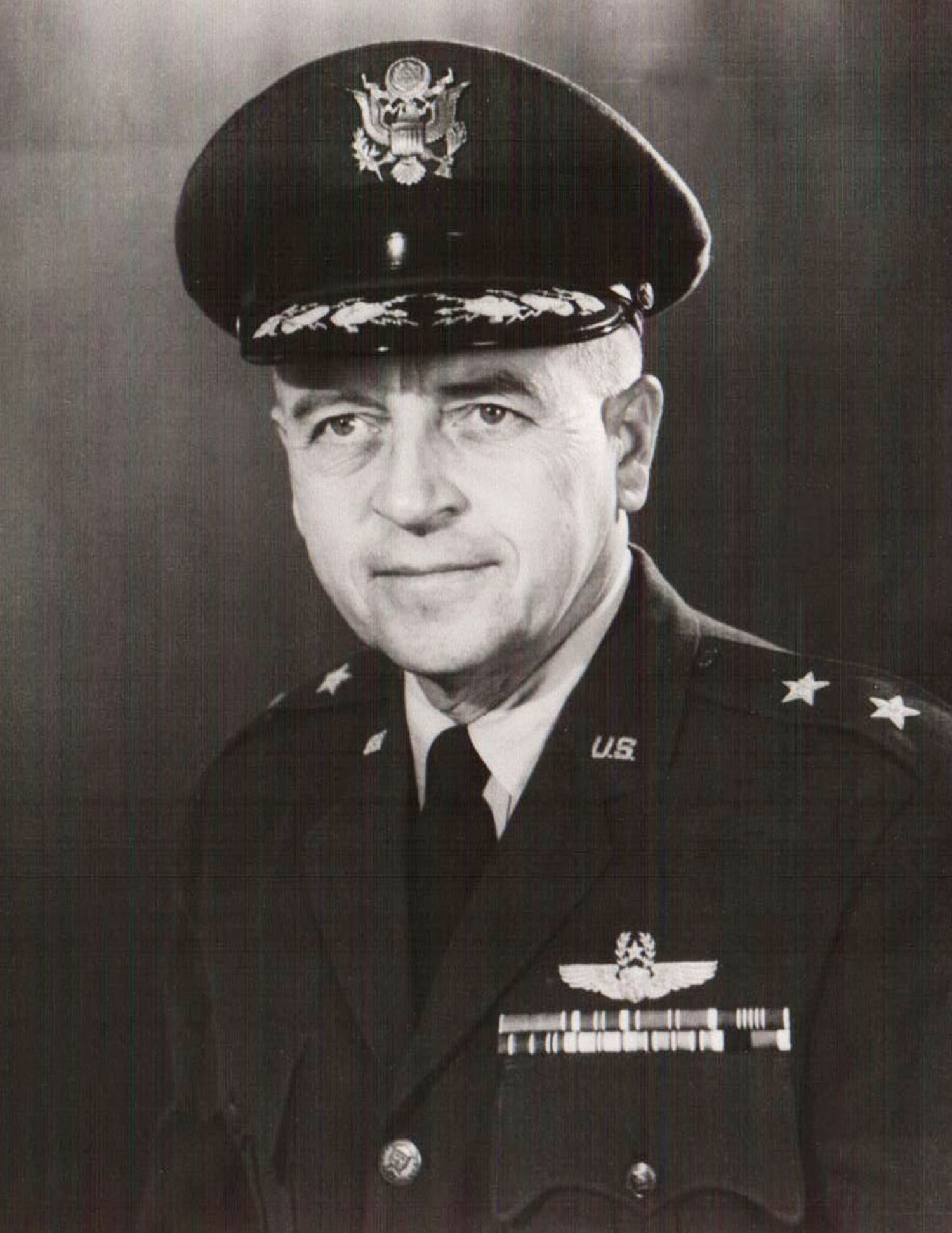
- Born: April 1, 1907; Albion, Illinois, U.S.
- Died: October 4, 2007 (aged 100)
- Military career
- Allegiance: United States of America
- Branch: United States Air Force
- Rank: Major general

Harold Huntley Bassett (April 1, 1907 – October 4, 2007) was a major general in the United States Air Force.

== Early life ==
Harold Huntley Bassett was born in April 1907 in Albion, Illinois. He would attend St. John's Military Academy in Delafield, Wisconsin, and the California Institute of Technology.

== Career ==
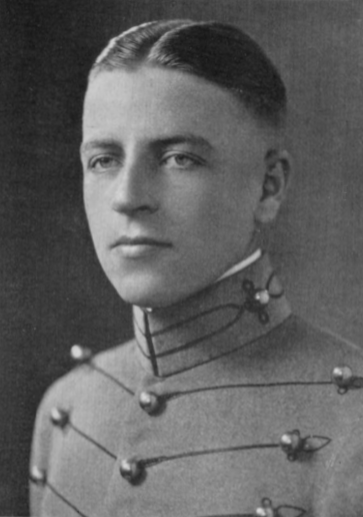
As a West Point cadet

Bassett graduated from the United States Military Academy in 1929. First he was assigned to the Corps of Engineers before transferring to the Air Corps. During World War II he served in the Air Weather Service. Later he was given command of the U.S. Air Force Security Service and the United States Taiwan Defense Command. In 1958 he was given command of the Air Weather Service. His retirement was effective as of October 1, 1959.

Awards he received include the Legion of Merit with oak leaf cluster, the Distinguished Flying Cross, and the Bronze Star Medal.

== Death ==
Bassett died on October 4, 2007.
