= Archibald Dennis Flower =

Sir Archibald Flower
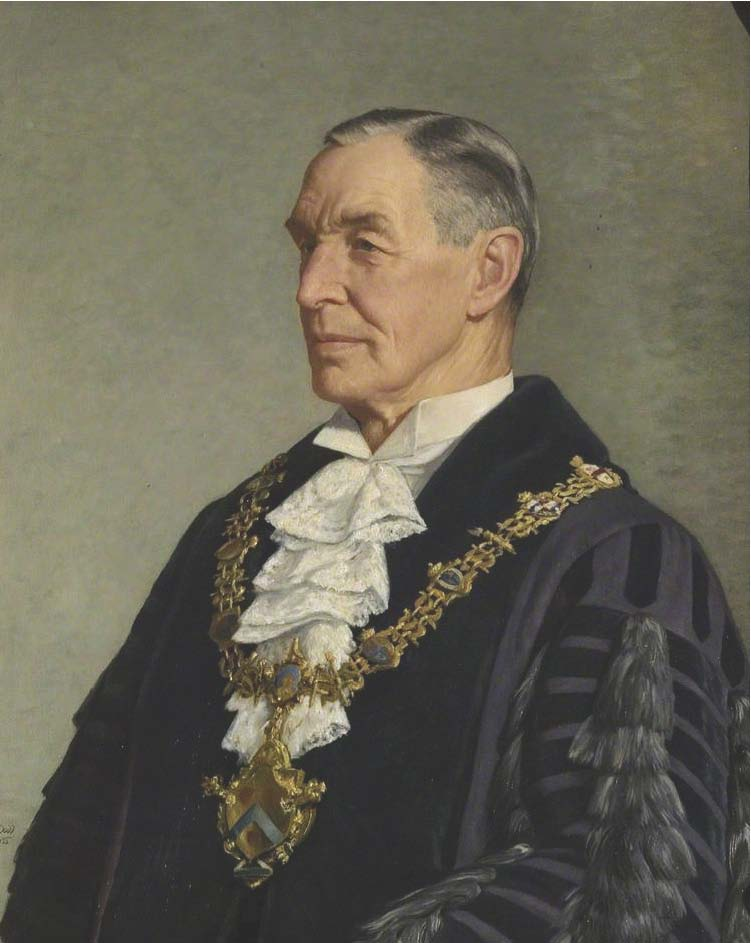
- Sir Archibald Flower in 1935
- Born: Archibald Dennis Flower; 31 October 1865; Stratford-upon-Avon, Warwickshire, England
- Died: 22 November 1950 (aged 85); Stratford-upon-Avon, Warwickshire
- Known for: Chairman of the Trustees and Guardians of Shakespeare's birthplace and of the Council of the Shakespeare Memorial Theatre

Sir Archibald Dennis Flower (31 October 1865 – 23 November 1950) was an English public servant who was Chairman of the Trustees and Guardians of Shakespeare's birthplace and of the Council of the Shakespeare Memorial Theatre.

== Early life ==
Flower was born in 1865, the son of Edgar Flower and his wife, Isabella Sophia. He was the grandson of Edward Fordham Flower. He was educated at Bedford Modern School and Clare College, Cambridge where he took part in the 1886 Boat Race.

== Career ==
Flower was elected to Warwickshire County Council in 1892. In 1900 he became Chairman of the Trustees and Guardians of Shakespeare's birthplace and of the Council of the Shakespeare Memorial Theatre. He was Mayor of Stratford-upon-Avon in 1900–02, 1915–18 and 1931. He was made a Knight Bachelor in 1930.

== Family life ==
Flower married Florence, daughter of Sir Richard Keane, 4th Baronet. They had two sons and one daughter. Lady Flower predeceased her husband in 1947. He died three years later at his home in Stratford.
