= Peter Finch Martineau =

English businessman (1755–1847)

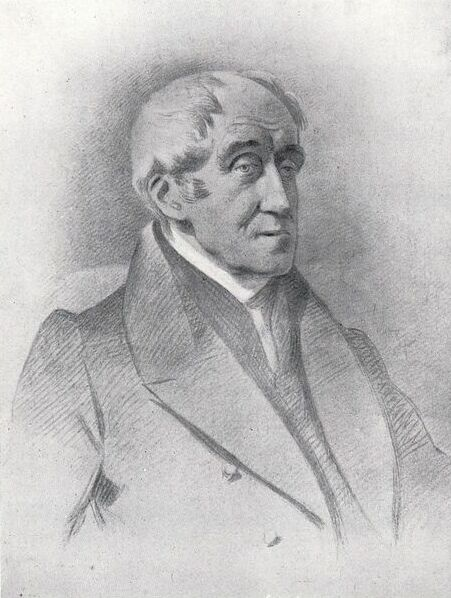
- Spouse(s): Catherine Marsh, Susannah Scott
- Relatives: Thomas Martineau, John Martineau
- Family: Martineau family

Peter Finch Martineau (12 June 1755 – 2 December 1847) was an English businessman and a philanthropist, with particular interest in improving the lives of disadvantaged people through education.

== Life and family ==
A Unitarian, he was born into the renowned Martineau family of Norwich and is listed in the 1939 edition of Burke's Landed Gentry as the third son of surgeon David and Sarah Martineau (née Meadows). He was christened in the Octagon Chapel. His eldest brother Philip Meadows Martineau became a distinguished surgeon and his youngest brother Thomas fathered sociologist Harriet Martineau and religious philosopher James Martineau. Engineer John Martineau was another of Peter's nephews.

His first wife Susannah Scott had one son and his second marriage to Catherine Marsh brought him five more children. He and Catherine were both buried at West Norwood Cemetery. Their first daughter, Catherine, married the solicitor Edward Foss. The eldest son Peter (1785–1869) married first Eliza Barnard and secondly Mary Anne (1794–1882), the sister of his schoolmate Sir Francis Ronalds. Their children included Sarah (1828–1908), whose husband was the brewer and benefactor Charles Edward Flower.

== Family business interests ==
Peter Finch Martineau was active in various distinct businesses through his life. He was first a textile dyer in Norwich with his older brother David. He, David and their younger brother John then established a brewery at the King's Arms Stairs (one of the watermen's stairs on the Thames), which merged with Whitbread in 1812. Next followed a sugar-refining partnership in Goulston Street, Whitechapel with his son Peter Jr, which continued until around the latter's death in 1869; Peter Jr patented an important new process for clarifying sugar in 1815 with his first cousin John Martineau. Peter Finch also opened a bank in St Albans after he moved there in 1818.

The family in addition invested in mining operations in Devon, Cornwall and overseas, managed by Peter Jr's second cousin John Taylor. These included the Wheal Friendship mine at Mary Tavy and United Mines near Redruth. They also held Directorships in various Assurance companies: Peter Finch in the Hand in Hand Fire Insurance Society, and Peter Jr in the Equitable Assurance Office – he also served as auditor of the Phoenix Fire Assurance Company.

== Education initiatives ==
The Martineaus supported a wide range of targeted education initiatives. Peter Finch was an early Governor of the African Institution, founded by abolitionists when they succeeded in making the British slave trade illegal. He helped establish the School for the Indigent Blind in 1800 and was still chairing its meetings nearly half a century later – the organisation continues today as SeeAbility. He was also a Governor of the London Asylum for the Support and Education of the Deaf and Dumb Children of the Poor; the House of Refuge for Orphan Girls; and the Refuge for the Destitute, which assisted people discharged from prison to enter the workforce. Finally, he served as vice-president of the Manchester Academy, the Nonconformist higher education institution in York - later Harris Manchester College, Oxford University - for nearly two decades. Peter's brother Thomas (1764–1826), a manufacturer of textiles, was a benefactor of the college.

== Political activities ==
Like others in his family, Martineau was Whig cum Radical in his politics. A friend of the political philosopher William Godwin, he joined the London Revolution Society and was an energetic supporter of Norwich MP William Smith. He later served as Deputy Lieutenant of Hertfordshire. Peter Jr played an active role in the Anti-Corn Law League from its beginnings in the late 1830s, where he chaired large meetings in the boroughs where he lived and worked to garner support for the removal of import duties.

Artist John Opie and his wife Amelia - a Whig - were friends with the Martineau family and in 1807 Peter was reportedly in the artist's London funeral procession alongside J.W.M. Turner, Sir Thomas Lawrence, Henry Bone and Sir William Beechey.
