= William Pickering (governor) =

5th Territorial Governor of Washington

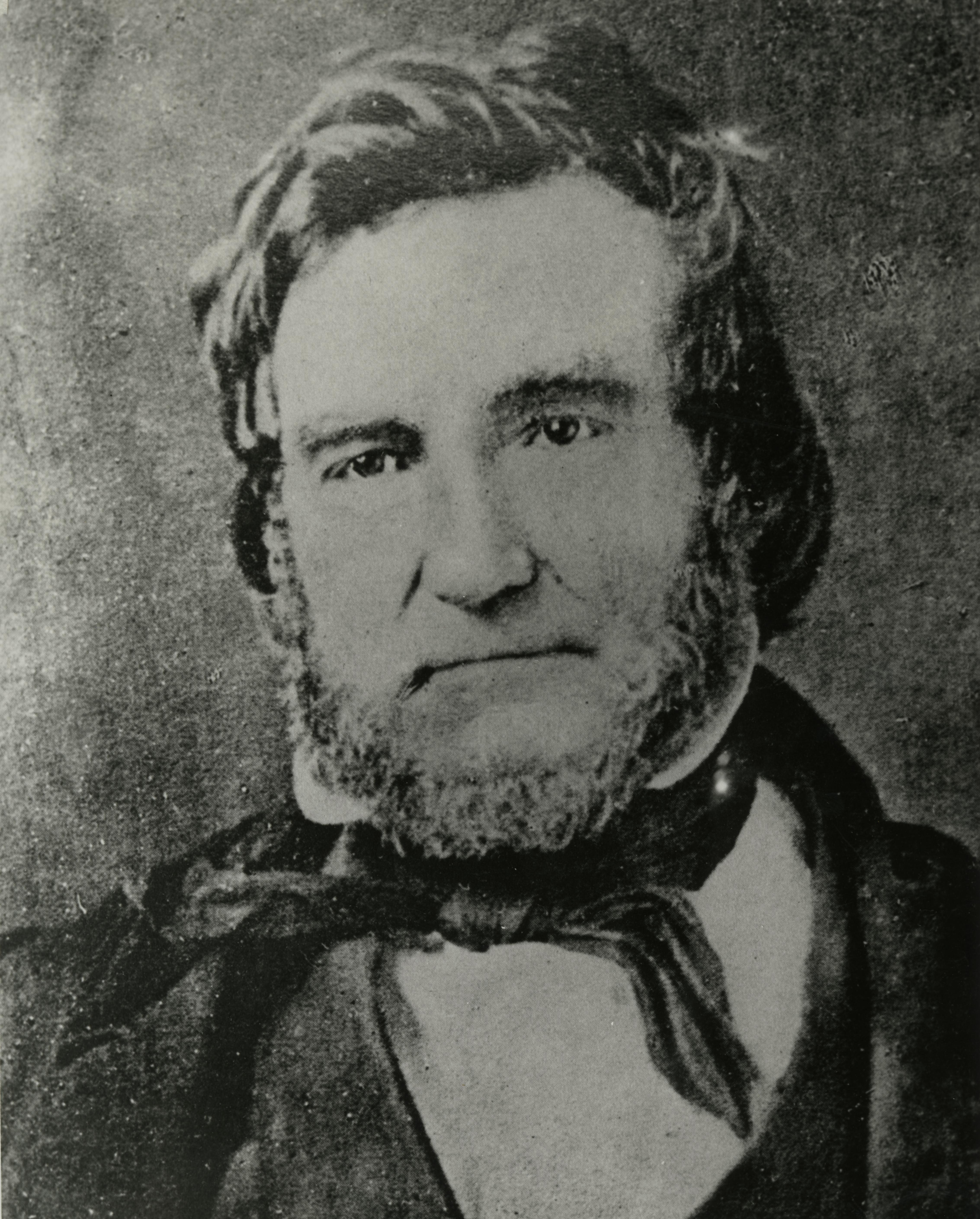

5th Territorial Governor of Washington
- In office June 1862 – January 8, 1867
- Preceded by: William H. Wallace
- Succeeded by: George E. Cole

Personal details
- Born: March 15, 1798 Yorkshire, England
- Died: April 22, 1873 (aged 75) Albion, Illinois
- Party: Republican
- Spouse: Martha Flower (m. 1824; died 1838)
- Children: 5

William Pickering (March 15, 1798 – April 22, 1873) was an English-born American politician who served as the fifth governor of Washington territory, from 1862 to 1866. He was a member of the Republican Party.

== Biography ==
Pickering was born in Yorkshire, England.

He graduated from Oxford University in 1820. The following year he moved to Edwards County, Illinois, acquiring property and involving himself in various businesses in the area of Albion, Illinois. On 9 March 1824 in Albion he married Martha Flower (1800–1838), daughter of Richard Flower and sister of Edward Fordham Flower. They had five children before she died on 28 December 1838. He never remarried.

He served in the Illinois House of Representatives from 1842 to 1852 and was a delegate to Republican National Convention from Illinois, 1860. In 1862 President Lincoln offered him the choice of being either part of the United States Ministry in England or Governor of the Washington territory, known at the time as the territory of Columbia. Pickering chose the governorship, and he moved to the territorial capital, Olympia, in June 1862, and served as governor until 1866.

On Sunday, September 4, 1864, he sent the first message over a transcontinental telegraph line. Under the leadership of Territorial Governor William Pickering, the government took responsibility for the care of the mentally ill. Lacking funds to build a hospital, the state contracted for the care of the mentally ill with the Sisters of Charity (now the Sisters of Providence), but, because of lack of funds, it was 19 months before the Sisters began to receive payment.

Pickering was an active member of St. John's Episcopal Church in Olympia, serving in a leadership role in its founding as a parish in 1866.

After his term, he moved back to Illinois, where he died in 1873.

Political offices
Preceded by William H. Wallace	Territorial Governor of Washington; 1862–1867	Succeeded by George Edward Cole
