= Richard Flower (settler) =

English banker, brewer and pioneer of Albion, Illinois

- Born: 1760; London, England
- Died: 2 September 1829 (aged 68–69); Albion, Illinois
- Occupations: Brewer, banker, farmer, writer
- Known for: Settlement of Edwards County, Illinois

Richard Flower (1760–1829) was an English banker and brewer who was one of the pioneers of Albion, Illinois and promoted English immigration to the USA after the War of 1812.

== Early life ==
Richard was the youngest son of George Flower (1715–1778), who had a stationery business in the City of London, and his wife Martha Fuller (1717-1805). She was the sister of two influential bankers: William Fuller, who became one of the richest men in England, and Richard Fuller, a long-serving Member of Parliament. His elder brother was Benjamin Flower.

== Career ==
Initially destined for an agricultural career, Richard instead went into business in Hertford, becoming a brewer and a banker. In 1803 he was able to sell up and retire to his country estate of Marden Hill, where he farmed and also pursued his political interests. These included financial support for his brother Benjamin's radical publications and his own campaigns against what he considered unjust taxation. In 1817 he sold up and took his whole family with all their possessions to join his son George in Illinois.

== Family ==
On 25 December 1786 at Hertford, Richard married Elizabeth Fordham (1765–1846), daughter of Edward Fordham (1721–1778) and sister of the brewer and banker Edward King Fordham. They had ten children, including George Flower (1788–1862) who with Morris Birkbeck was one of the founders of the English Settlement in Illinois, Martha Flower (1800–1838) who married William Pickering (governor), Mary Katherine Flower (1802–1852) who wed Sir Francis Ronalds' brother Hugh Ronalds, and the brewer Edward Fordham Flower.

== Publications ==
- Observations on Beer and Brewers, in which the inequality, injustice and impolicy of the malt and beer tax are demonstrated. Richard Flower. Cambridge, 1802
- Abolition of Tithe recommended, in an address to the agriculturalists of Great Britain ... with some observations on the present construction of the law of tithing, etc. Richard Flower. Harlow, 1809.
- Flower's Letters from Lexington (25 June 1819) and the Illinois (August 16, 1819). Reprint of the original edition. Richard Flower. London, 1819. 1819
- Letters from the Illinois, 1820, 1821. Containing an account of the English settlement at Albion and its vicinity, and a refutation of various misrepresentations, those more particularly of Mr. Cobbett; with a letter from M. Birkbeck; and a preface and notes by B. Flower. Richard Flower. London, 1822.
