= The Arena (magazine) =

American literary and political magazine

- "We do not take possession of our ideas, but are possessed by them; They master us and force us into the arena, where, like gladiators, we must fight for them" — Heine
- June, 1908 edition of The Arena
- Founder: B. O. Flower
- Publisher: Arena Publishing Co.
- Founded: 1890
- Ceased publication: 1909
- City: Boston
- Country: United States

The Arena was a liberal literary and political magazine published by Arena Publishing Co. in Boston, Massachusetts. It was founded by Benjamin Orange Flower in 1889 and existed for twenty years. Though it had a circulation of more than 30,000 at one point, it was rarely profitable. The final issue was published in August 1909.

== Publication history ==
The Arena was established by Benjamin Orange Flower in December 1889. The magazine was a monthly with volumes typically consisting of six issues.

The magazine advocated social reform, featuring articles about poverty, slums, sweatshops, child labor, and other social problems. It openly advocated birth control, free silver, agrarian reform, the single tax, and trust-busting. It was the only journal of national import to support William Jennings Bryan in 1896. Later, it advocated penal reform and opposed capital punishment.

Women wrote a quarter of the contents during its first twenty volumes. A section of Garland's Main-Travelled Roads first appeared in The Arena. The Arena later employed investigative journalists and became known as a muckraker. The magazine published articles on socialism and was supportive of efforts to organize workers into trade unions. It favored literature that supported the poor and powerless.

== Selected notable contributors ==
- Lyman Abbot
- Felix Adler
- Edward Bellamy
- Joseph Rodes Buchanan
- Helen Stuart Campbell
- Stephen Crane
- Hamlin Garland
- William Lloyd Garrison
- Henry George
- Laurence Gronlund
- James A. Herne
- Elbert Hubbard
- Robert G. Ingersoll
- Mary Livermore
- William D. McCrackan
- Frank Parsons
- William Ordway Partridge
- Minot Judson Savage
- Upton Sinclair
- Elizabeth Cady Stanton
- Leo Tolstoy
