= Charles Edward Flower =

British brewer (1830–1892)

- Born: 1830
- Died: 1892

Charles Edward Flower (1830–1892) was an English brewer.

He was the eldest son of Edward Fordham Flower and brother of William Henry Flower.

It was through his efforts that the Shakespeare Memorial Theatre was commissioned in 1874/5 (opened 1879). The theatre was very badly damaged by fire in 1926, 47 years after its opening.

In 1852, Flower married Sarah Martineau, granddaughter of Peter Finch Martineau and niece of Sir Francis Ronalds. The couple had no children.
