= Morris Birkbeck =

American politician (1764–1825)

Morris Birkbeck (January 23, 1764 – June 4, 1825) was an English agricultural innovator, author/publicist, anti-slavery campaigner and early 19th-century pioneer in southern Illinois, in the United States. With George Flower he founded the English Settlement and the town of Albion, Illinois, and served briefly as the secretary of state of Illinois.

== Early years ==
Birkbeck was born at Settle, West Riding of Yorkshire, England, the son of an influential Quaker also named Morris Birkbeck, and his wife Hannah Bradford. He is of the same Birkbeck family as George Birkbeck (1776-1841), doctor, educationalist, philanthropist, reformer, and founder of Birkbeck College, London, and the Mechanics' Institutes; and of John Birkbeck (1817-1890), a Yorkshire banker, alpinist, and pioneer potholer.

By 1794, as leaseholder, Birkbeck was farming an estate of 1,500 acres (6.1 km^{2}) at Wanborough, Surrey, where he joined others in England and France who were experimenting with crossbreeding Merino sheep. On April 24, 1794, Birkbeck married Prudence Bush, daughter of Richard and Prudence Bush of Wandsworth, Surrey. After ten years of marriage, on October 25, 1804, Prudence died from the complications of childbirth, leaving her husband with seven young children. Birkbeck remained a widower for the rest of his life.

In 1814, accompanied by his friend and fellow Merino sheep breeder George Flower (1788-1862), son of Richard Flower, Birkbeck traveled in recently defeated France. His Notes on a Journey through France (1814) revealed a good-tempered, fair-minded observer, well grounded in science and the humanities. A radical in both politics and religion, Birkbeck was increasingly annoyed at being taxed by a government that denied him a vote because of his Quaker faith, but that also required him to be tithed by a church he did not belong to, and in fact held in contempt.

In London, Birkbeck met US president James Madison's private secretary Edward Coles, who had been sent on a diplomatic mission to Europe. Coles had recently travelled into the newly formed Illinois Territory, and extolled its virtues to Birkbeck, as well as proclaimed his intent to move there. In early 1817, with a party consisting chiefly of his children and wards, Birkbeck emigrated to the United States. George Flower had emigrated first, leaving his wife and two young sons in England in 1816, and had spent most of the previous winter with former President Thomas Jefferson at Monticello, as well as with Coles' family in Virginia. Birkbeck and his family rejoined Flower and some fellow English idealists, and together they headed west in search of land on which to settle and try to establish a utopian community free of the repression and restraints of their homeland.

== Life in Illinois ==
During 1817–18 Birkbeck began preparing for their scheme by buying about 26,400 acres (107 km^{2}) of public land in the far south of Edwards County, in the Illinois Territory. Flower returned to England to organize emigrants, raise money for the venture, and arrange for his father's family to emigrate. Birkbeck and Flower hoped to establish a new community in the sparsely-settled Wabash River Valley where English men and women would be able to escape the economic and political tyranny they believed England had become. Both men had close family ties to Britain's radical political and religious establishment.

Birkbeck published Notes on a Journey in America from the Coast of Virginia to the Territory of Illinois (1817), first in Philadelphia, then in London, Dublin, and Cork. An account of the party's emigration travel experiences, with vague references to their plans for establishing a wilderness sanctuary, it became immensely popular, with its promise of improving the lives of downtrodden working and middle-class Europeans. It ran through eleven editions in English in two years, and was published in German at Jena (1818), and translated into Swedish by Georg Scheutz (1818). Birkbeck's follow-up, Letters from Illinois (1818), published in Boston, Philadelphia, and London, went through seven editions in English, besides being translated in 1819 into French and German.

The radical nature of the anti-clerical and anti-aristocratic vision presented in Birkbeck's writings frightened Britain's conservative establishment, even as it excited thousands to dream of following him to the Illinois prairies. A pamphlet war ensued, where pundits, editors and ordinary folk debated the merits of Birkbeck and Flower's radical political statement and reform efforts, thrusting the two men before the Anglo-American reading public, while English emigrants and their investigating agents headed for "The English Prairie" to ascertain the truth of the settlement's prospects.

But soon Birkbeck and Flower became estranged, ostensibly over George Flower's bigamous marriage to Eliza Julia Andrews. She was the orphaned niece of John Towill Rutt (an English political activist, social reformer, nonconformist man of letters, and Joseph Priestley's biographer). Eliza had accompanied the Birkbeck family from England to Illinois, possibly because Flowers' father, who emigrated with him and two brothers and two sisters, knew that their romance had broken up Flower's adolescent marriage to his first cousin Jane Dawson. Divorce was also difficult to obtain in England, and while an Indiana Justice of the Peace married Eliza and George in 1817, George didn't receive an Illinois marriage license for his union with Eliza until after receiving a special Illinois legislative divorce from Jane in 1836, long after their first child (a daughter) was born in Chambersburg, Pennsylvania, but before their son became a minister. Birkbeck never approved of George and Eliza's romance, whether on moral grounds, or because he had hoped to marry his ward himself. Soon, the disaffection between the male leaders affected the English Settlement as a whole.

In 1818 Birkbeck laid out the town of Wanborough, and Flower, whose 1500 acres adjoined Birkbeck's, laid out the town of Albion nearby. The men never reconciled, nor ever again directly spoke to one another. Initial hopes both had for the venture were extinguished as factions formed and conflict abounded. Nevertheless, the English Prairie Settlement was soon overwhelmed by immigrants answering Birkbeck's clarion call. The settlement reported 400 English and 700 American residents by 1819, but only 800 were indicated in an informal survey in 1822.

Birkbeck became president of Illinois' first agricultural society. He promoted scientific farming techniques, especially concerning livestock, although his Illinois neighbors initially ridiculed him for sowing only a half acre of potatoes and breaking his plow the first year, particularly since Birkbeck had predicted that he could cultivate 100 acres of maize from the hard-packed prairie.

Long involved in abolitionism in England, Birkbeck assisted his London acquaintance Edward Coles - who had become the second governor of Illinois - in working against slavery in Illinois, particularly during an attempt to legalize the 'peculiar institution' in the new state. In 1823, Birkbeck, through newspaper articles under the pen name "Jonathan Freeman," helped to consolidate the antislavery forces in Illinois and ensure that it remained a free state. In 1824, Coles appointed Birkbeck as Secretary of State of Illinois. Birkbeck served for three months, but was turned out when the proslavery majority in the state Senate refused to confirm his appointment. Albion also became the Edwards county seat, although residents of Mount Carmel across the river attempted to retrieve some court records by force, and ultimately succeeded in splitting off their area as Wabash County, Illinois. The outcome made Edwards County the fourth smallest county in Illinois.

== Death and legacy ==
On June 4, 1825, while returning on horseback from a visit to Welsh industrialist and social reformer Robert Owen at New Harmony, Indiana, Birkbeck drowned trying to cross the rain-swollen Fox River, a tributary of the Wabash River. He was sixty one years old. He had been travelling with his twenty-three-year-old son Bradford Birkbeck, as well as Judge James O. Wattles and other 'English Prairie' residents, who were interested in Owen's newly proposed utopian community at New Harmony.

Morris Birkbeck's death devastated the settlement, and his sons and daughters were left at loose ends. They soon formed an Owenite society at Wanborough, but it was short-lived because they could not maintain its economic viability. All that remains of Morris Birkbeck's settlement at Wanborough, Illinois is the cemetery, with an Illinois historical marker. But Albion prospered through the years, and remains the county seat of one of the smallest counties in the state of Illinois. Also, an unincorporated community in central Illinois takes the name of the pioneer reformer: Birkbeck, Illinois.

Pioneering American journalist and early women's rights advocate Margaret Fuller lauded Birkbeck in her book Summer on the Lakes (1844), praising him for his generous communal vision, and recounting the sad circumstances of his death. Ironically, she herself also drowned tragically, in a shipwreck off Fire Island, New York, in 1850.

Birkbeck's eldest son Richard eventually moved to New Harmony, where he died a broken man in 1839. Sons Bradford and Charles, and the families of daughters Eliza and Prudence, emigrated to Zacatecas, Mexico, where Bradford and Charles managed English silver mines. Prudence, who left her husband Frances Hanks at the Prairie settlement, died of cholera in 1833, and Bradford took in her three orphaned daughters Clara, Lucy, and Caroline.

Birkbeck's daughter Eliza (1797-1880) married Gilbert Titus Pell (1796-1860), who came from a prominent family of New York politicians and business people. Gilbert Pell served as a member of the Illinois House of Representatives, and was appointed United States envoy to Mexico in the 1850s. He was the son of shipping merchant Benjamin Pell (c. 1750–1828), and a brother of William Ferris Pell. He was descended from Sir John Pell (1643-1702), Lord of Pelham Manor, New York, who was the son of English mathematician Dr. John Pell, and nephew and heir of early American settler and pioneer Thomas Pell. Eliza became estranged from her husband, and returned to England with their son Morris Birkbeck Pell. Morris Pell studied mathematics at Cambridge University, where he graduated as Senior Wrangler (top mathematics undergraduate), in 1849. In 1852 he emigrated with his family to the British colony of New South Wales (Australia), to become the inaugural Professor of Mathematics and Natural Philosophy at the newly opened Sydney University.

After several years of mining management in Mexico, Bradford and Charles Birkbeck also emigrated to Australia, to raise sheep at their pioneer settlement at Rockhampton, in Queensland. Glenmore Homestead (originally about one hundred and twenty five square miles), is today still worked by the descendants of Samuel Bradford ("SB") Birkbeck.

Political offices
Preceded by David Blackwell	Illinois Secretary of State; 1824	Succeeded by George Forquer
