= Wanborough, Illinois =

- Former settlement
- Location within Illinois
- Coordinates: 38°22′43″N 88°05′30″W
- Country: United States
- State: Illinois
- County: Edwards
- Elevation: 492 ft (150 m)
- GNIS feature ID: 1808177

Wanborough is a former settlement in Edwards County, Illinois, United States. Wanborough was 2 miles (3.2 km) west of Albion.

== History ==
The community was named after a Wanborough in England. In the spring of 1826 Wanborough was the location of a short-lived socialist colony established upon the model of Robert Owen.

== See also ==
- List of Owenite communities in the United States
