= Edward Fordham Flower =

English brewer (1805–1883)

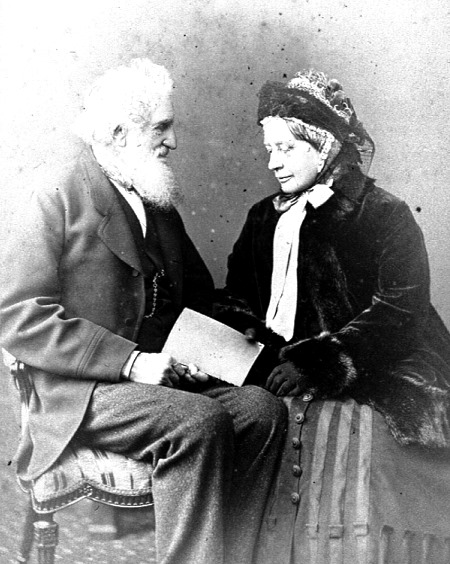
Flower in old age with his wife Celina

Edward Fordham Flower (31 January 1805 – 26 March 1883) was an English brewer and author who campaigned for a Shakespeare memorial theatre and against cruelty to animals.

== Origins ==
Born at Marden Hill in Hertfordshire on 31 January 1805, Flower was the younger surviving son of settler Richard Flower and nephew of both writer Benjamin Flower and minister John Clayton. His mother was Elizabeth Fordham, daughter of Edward Fordham and sister of banker Edward King Fordham.

== Life ==
At age 12, Flower's father took his family to live in the newly created community of Albion in Illinois. The settlement included free Negroes, who were abducted by a gang of kidnappers to sell into slavery. Edward led a party that captured the gang at rifle point, freed their captives and saw the leaders tried and punished. Threatened with death by their supporters, Edward was sitting at home when a bullet shattered the mirror above his head.

His father sent him back to England and in 1824 he settled at Stratford-upon-Avon, where he joined a business. and in 1827 married the owner's daughter. In 1831 he built his own brewery in Stratford, with a canal frontage for delivery and distribution. The enterprise flourished, becoming Flower and Sons Ltd, and when larger premises using latest technology were opened in 1870, the original brewery was used for offices with reduced production. By 1836, the first tied public house had been linked to the firm and their inn holdings increased gradually. Export trade, particularly of India pale ale, was always a large sector of the business.

As a major employer in the area, he was influential in local affairs, serving four times as mayor of Stratford and sitting as a justice of the peace for Warwickshire. He attempted to enter national politics, standing as Liberal candidate for Coventry in 1865 and for North Warwickshire in 1868, but was not successful.

Perhaps his greatest legacy is his involvement in the celebrations, to which he was a major financial contributor, marking the tercentenary of Shakespeare's birth in 1864, and the impetus they gave to create a permanent memorial in the town. Fund raising began to erect a theatre, which opened in 1879 as the Shakespeare Memorial Theatre.

In 1873, he retired and moved to London where, being a great lover of horses, he spent the rest of his life campaigning to reduce the suffering caused by inappropriate harness, in particular tight bearing reins (also criticised in the 1877 novel Black Beauty) and gag bits.

He died in London on 26 March 1883, followed by his widow on 2 March 1884.

== Family ==
In 1827, Flower married Celina Greaves, eldest daughter of John Greaves (1774-1849), later a banker living at Radford Semele, and his wife Mary Whitehead (1779-1864). She was the sister of the slate entrepreneur John Whitehead Greaves. They were survived by three sons:

- Charles Edward Flower (1830-1892), who ran the brewery with the youngest brother Edgar but had no children.
- Sir William Henry Flower (1831-1899), who pursued a scientific career, becoming Director of the Natural History Museum.
- Edgar Flower (1833-1903), who ran the brewery with Charles and passed it to his son Sir Archibald Dennis Flower.

== Writings ==
Works he authored were:

- A Few Words about Bearing Reins, 1875.
- Bits and Bearing Reins, 1875, illustrated by John Paget.
- Horses and Harness, 1876.
- The Stones of London, or Macadam v. Vestries, 1880.
