= English Settlement (Illinois) =

Former planned settlement in Illinois

Coordinates: 38°22′38″N 88°3′40″W

The location of the English Settlement in present-day Illinois.

The English Settlement is the name given to a planned settlement of some 26,000 acres (110 km^{2}) in the Illinois Territory. It was founded by Morris Birkbeck and George Flower in the early nineteenth century. In 1816 the two men chose the location, bought the land, and eventually brought over about 200 settlers from England. The chief surviving town is Albion, Illinois, although some of Birkbeck's followers joined the Owenite utopian community at New Harmony, Indiana after his death. The well funded and organized English settlement was important both for its influence on pioneer agriculture and the influence of its leaders on rejecting slavery in Illinois.
