= Albion, Illinois =

- City
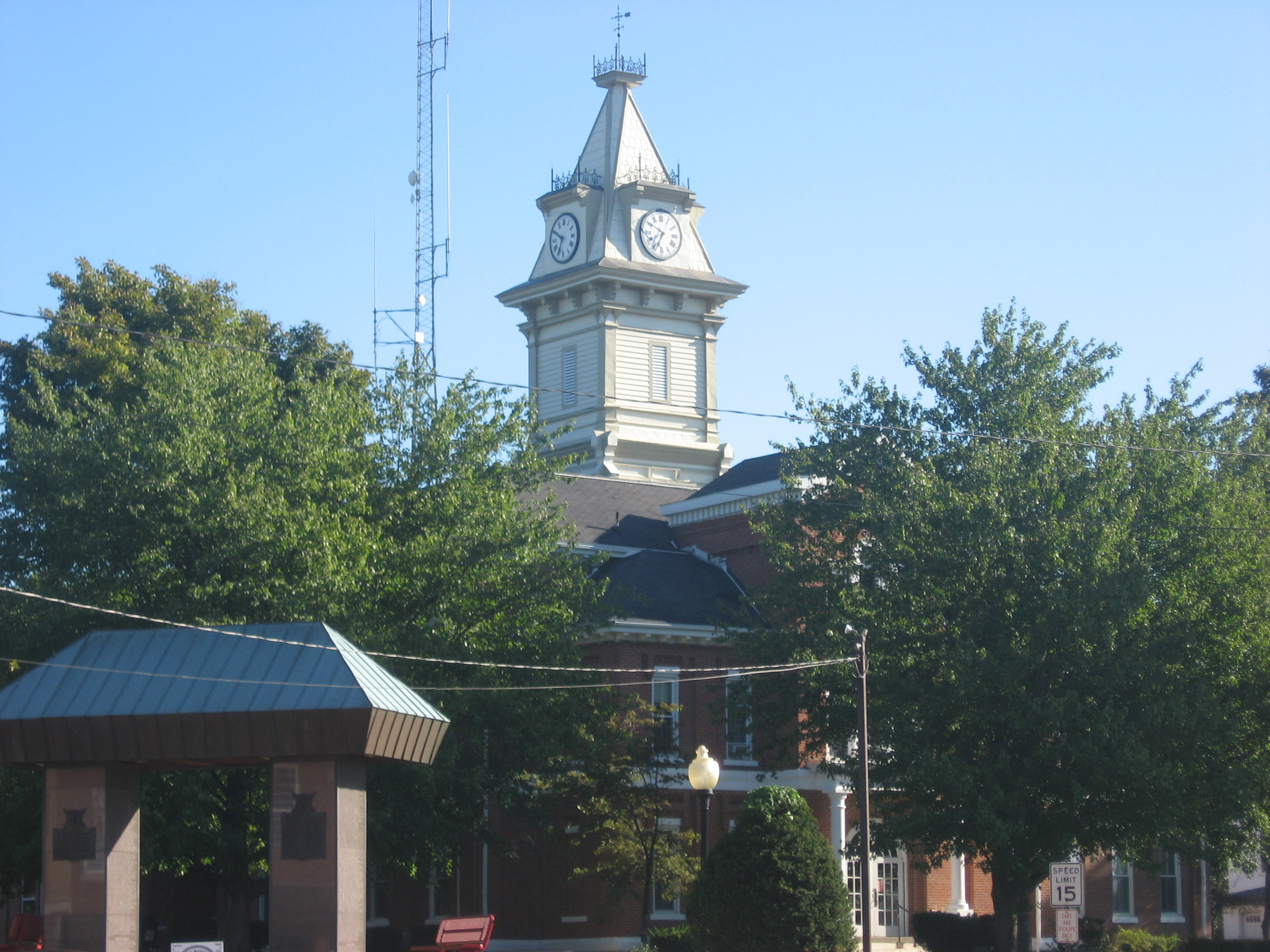
- Edwards County Courthouse, a local landmark
- Interactive map of Albion, Illinois
- Location within Illinois Location within the United States
- Coordinates: 38°22′36″N 88°03′29″W
- Country: United States
- State: Illinois
- County: Edwards

Area
  - Total: 2.18 sq mi (5.65 km^{2})
  - Land: 2.14 sq mi (5.53 km^{2})
  - Water: 0.046 sq mi (0.12 km^{2})
- Elevation: 525 ft (160 m)

Population (2020)
  - Total: 1,971
  - Density: 922.9/sq mi (356.32/km^{2})
- Time zone: UTC-6 (CST)
  - Summer (DST): UTC-5 (CDT)
- ZIP Code(s): 62806
- Area code: 618
- FIPS code: 17-00568
- GNIS ID: 2393906

Albion is a city in and the county seat of Edwards County, Illinois, United States. The population was 1,971 at the 2020 census. The city was named "Albion" after an ancient and poetic reference to the island of Great Britain.

== History ==
The settlement now known as Albion was originally known to the world as "Mr. Morris Birkbeck's English Prairie", when Morris Birkbeck, an English Quaker, with co-founder George Flower (1788–1862) established the town as a utopian community in 1817. In 1818, following an irreconcilable fall-out between Birkbeck and Flower, the portion of English Prairie then settled on by Flower was given the name Albion.

In 1821, the county seat of Edwards County was moved from Palmyra to Albion, eighteen miles to the west. However, residents of the larger Mount Carmel felt their town should be the county seat. Four companies of militia marched from Mount Carmel towards Albion to seize the county documents stored in the courthouse. The situation was eventually resolved in 1824 by separating Wabash County from Edwards County at Bonpas Creek and making Mount Carmel the seat of Wabash County. The two counties are among the smallest in Illinois.

The township of Albion has a curious link with England and brewing. George Flower and Morris Birkbeck, a Quaker agriculturalist and radical, organised the purchase of 26,400 acres of land in the southern "Illinois Territory," and encouraged settlers from England to come and join them. Among them was George's father Richard Flower, an experienced brewer (who at some point taught his son about making popular beer styles of the period, including London Porter). Flower came across the Atlantic with all his remaining children.

The settlement espoused a firm abolitionist ethos, and escaped slaves from Kentucky settled in Albion, encouraged by the Flowers and other community leaders. However, these formerly enslaved people were always in danger of being kidnapped by bounty hunters aiming to return them to slavery. Around 1823-24 one such gang of eight to ten kidnapped a group of free African-American residents of Albion and headed south. They were pursued by an outraged armed party led by Richard's youngest son, Edward. He was only eighteen years old, but his posse successfully captured the gang "at the rifle's mouth," freed the captives, and took the kidnappers to face judgment under the law.

Friends or ‘business associates’ of the original kidnappers' allies plotted to kill the young Flower or his father in revenge. According to some newspaper reports, a cousin also named Richard was tragically mistaken for Edward's father and killed in a pre-planned argument and fight. On another occasion, a bullet was fired through a window of Richard's house and smashed a mirror above his head. The family decided that the only safe plan was for Edward Flower to leave the country. Back in England after 1825, he decided to take up the family trade and, after a struggling start, Flower's Brewery in Stratford-upon-Avon became one of the most famous in England, surviving as a separate company to the 1950s and as a brand to this day. Edward loved Illinois and missed his former life in America with his family. He regretted his forced departure and frequently mused about returning. During the Civil War, Flower spoke at meetings around Britain and Ireland in support of the Union, and against slavery. As a retiree, he made a six-month visit to the US with his wife Celina in 1866, after the war was over.

On June 2, 1990, as part of the larger June 1990 Lower Ohio Valley tornado outbreak, An F4 passed through the town. As it moved through, famous footage was taken of the Tornado showing it growing several vortacies that extended out like arms.

== Geography ==
Albion is located south of the center of Edwards County. In it, Illinois Route 130 and Illinois Route 15 meet. Route 130 leads north 25 miles (40 km) to Olney and south 10 miles (16 km) to Grayville, while Route 15 leads east 16 miles (26 km) to Mount Carmel and west 16 miles (26 km) to Fairfield.

According to the 2021 census gazetteer files, Albion has a total area of 2.18 square miles (5.65 km^{2}), of which 2.14 square miles (5.54 km^{2}) (or 97.89%) is land and 0.05 square miles (0.13 km^{2}) (or 2.11%) is water.

A 3.8-magnitude earthquake occurred seven and a half miles outside of the city on September 19, 2017.

=== Climate ===
Climate data for Albion
Month	Jan	Feb	Mar	Apr	May	Jun	Jul	Aug	Sep	Oct	Nov	Dec	Year
Mean daily maximum °F (°C)	39.9 (4.4)	43.7 (6.5)	55.2 (12.9)	67.7 (19.8)	77.6 (25.3)	86.3 (30.2)	90.0 (32.2)	88.6 (31.4)	82.2 (27.9)	70.3 (21.3)	55.7 (13.2)	43.2 (6.2)	66.7 (19.3)
Mean daily minimum °F (°C)	23.2 (−4.9)	25.2 (−3.8)	35.0 (1.7)	45.3 (7.4)	55.0 (12.8)	63.6 (17.6)	67.2 (19.6)	65.5 (18.6)	58.6 (14.8)	46.7 (8.2)	36.4 (2.4)	26.7 (−2.9)	45.7 (7.6)
Average precipitation inches (mm)	3.2 (81)	2.7 (69)	4.4 (110)	4.4 (110)	4.8 (120)	4.1 (100)	3.6 (91)	3.4 (86)	3.0 (76)	2.9 (74)	3.7 (94)	3.3 (84)	43.4 (1,100)
Source: Weatherbase

== Demographics ==
Historical population
Census	Pop.	Note	%±
1850	365		—
1860	448		22.7%
1870	613		36.8%
1880	875		42.7%
1890	937		7.1%
1900	1,162		24.0%
1910	1,281		10.2%
1920	1,584		23.7%
1930	1,666		5.2%
1940	1,855		11.3%
1950	2,287		23.3%
1960	2,025		−11.5%
1970	1,791		−11.6%
1980	2,285		27.6%
1990	2,116		−7.4%
2000	1,933		−8.6%
2010	1,988		2.8%
2020	1,971		−0.9%
U.S. Decennial Census

=== 2020 census ===
As of the 2020 census, Albion had a population of 1,971. The median age was 40.2 years. 25.3% of residents were under the age of 18 and 19.8% of residents were 65 years of age or older. For every 100 females there were 88.1 males, and for every 100 females age 18 and over there were 86.6 males age 18 and over.

0.0% of residents lived in urban areas, while 100.0% lived in rural areas.

There were 861 households in Albion, of which 28.6% had children under the age of 18 living in them. Of all households, 40.8% were married-couple households, 20.0% were households with a male householder and no spouse or partner present, and 31.7% were households with a female householder and no spouse or partner present. About 36.0% of all households were made up of individuals and 18.7% had someone living alone who was 65 years of age or older.

There were 953 housing units, of which 9.7% were vacant. The homeowner vacancy rate was 1.8% and the rental vacancy rate was 7.5%.

Racial composition as of the 2020 census
Race	Number	Percent
White	1,855	94.1%
Black or African American	12	0.6%
American Indian and Alaska Native	0	0.0%
Asian	20	1.0%
Native Hawaiian and Other Pacific Islander	7	0.4%
Some other race	10	0.5%
Two or more races	67	3.4%
Hispanic or Latino (of any race)	30	1.5%

=== Income and poverty ===
The median income for a household in the city was $43,971, and the median income for a family was $64,375. Males had a median income of $37,422 versus $30,370 for females. The per capita income for the city was $24,818. About 16.5% of families and 18.1% of the population were below the poverty line, including 23.4% of those under age 18 and 6.6% of those age 65 or over.

== Notable people ==
- Harold Huntley Bassett, U.S. Air Force major general
- Morris Birkbeck, first Illinois Secretary of State, one of Albion's founders
- Louis Lincoln Emmerson, served as Secretary of State of Illinois and Governor of Illinois
- Benjamin Orange Flower, Journalist
- Edward Fordham Flower, English brewer
- Harold A. Garman, U.S. Army medic and Medal of Honor recipient in World War II
- Guy U. Hardy, former congressman from Colorado
- Jeff Keener, former pitcher for the St. Louis Cardinals
- H. H. Kohlsaat, publisher and confidante of five U.S. presidents
- Bruce Mendenhall, convicted murderer and alleged serial killer
- George Frederick Pentecost, clergyman, evangelist and co-worker with revivalist D.L. Moody
- William Pickering, fifth governor of Washington Territory

== See also ==
- Edwards County Community Unit School District 1
