= Burden (surname) =

Burden is a surname. Notable people with the surname include:

- Alfie Burden, English professional snooker player
- Amanda Burden (née Mortimer; born 1944), American urban planner
- Arthur Scott Burden (1879–1921), American equestrian
- Barry Burden (born 1971), American political scientist
- Bob Burden, American cartoon artist
- Bob Burden (academic), English educational researcher and theorist
- Carter Burden (1941–1996), American politician
- Chris Burden, American avant-garde artist
- Doug Burden (born 1965), American rower
- Francis Burden (1829/30–1882), British chess player
- Fred Burden (1852–1897), editor, Adelaide Advertiser
- Harold Nelson Burden (1860–1930), English clergyman and health administrator
- Henry Burden, 19th century industrialist
- Henry John Burden (1894–1960), Canadian flying ace
- Jane Morris née Jane Burden (1839–1914), English artists' model
- John Burden (1862–1942), American SDA minister
- John Burden (footballer), English footballer
- John Britten Burden (1855–1922), pharmacist in Adelaide
- Luther Burden (1953–2015), American basketball player
- Luther Burden III (born 2003), American football player
- Michael Burden, Dean of New College, Oxford
- Nora Burden (1908–1992), Australian stained glass artist
- Richard Burden (born 1954), Member of UK parliament
- Suzanne Burden, British actor
- Thomas William Burden (1885–1970), British Labour politician
- William Burden (disambiguation), several people

- William A. M. Burden (1906–1984), American Ambassador to Belgium
- William A. M. Burden Sr. (1877–1909), American football player and stock broker
- William Douglas Burden (1898–1978), American naturalist and author
- William Fletcher Burden (1830–1867), American industrialist
- William Burden (tenor), American singer

== See also ==
- Burdon (surname)
