= Cambridge Intelligencer =

- Type: Weekly newspaper
- Editor: Benjamin Flower
- Founded: 1793
- Ceased publication: 1803

The Cambridge Intelligencer was an English weekly newspaper, appearing from 1793 to 1803, and edited by Benjamin Flower. The historian J. E. Cookson called it "the most vigorous and outspoken liberal periodical of its day".

Flower suffered imprisonment for contempt of the House of Lords, for remarks made in the Intelligencer against Richard Watson, bishop of Llandaff. His case followed that of Gilbert Wakefield, followed a different procedure, and had a temporary chilling effect on radical publishing at the end of the 18th century.

== Editorial policy ==
The Intelligencer first appeared on 20 July 1793, and from the start opposed the French Revolutionary Wars. It was one of a number of provincial journals opposed to the administration of William Pitt the Younger; and managed to sustain its editorial independence. It opposed the Anglo-Irish Union.

The Intelligencer was considered to represent the standpoint of rational dissent, and was called "the most infamous paper that ever disgraced the press", by the Anti-Jacobin. By 1796 James Montgomery was asking the editor acting for him not to reprint material from the Intelligencer. Flower was able to continue editorial work while confined to Newgate Prison in 1799, lodging with the jail keeper John Kirby.

The paper ran editorials, an innovation associated with the radical press of this period. Flower was anticipated in this development, which had been in use for a few years in the Sheffield Register of Joseph Gales, the Derby Mercury of William Ward, and Montgomery's Sheffield Iris.

== Advertisements ==
The advertising content of the Intelligencer was light, but included promotions related to Stourbridge Fair. The publisher Martha Gurney advertised the trial transcripts of her brother Joseph. A work of Thomas Oldfield on electoral boroughs was given space by Flower. James Lackington advertised his second-hand book emporium.

== Circulation ==
The Intelligencer functioned for a time more like a national newspaper, with circulation handled by representatives in Carmarthen, Dartmouth, Glasgow and York. The copies sold rose at times to more than 2000, when a typical provincial newspaper would expect several hundreds. There was distribution during 1795–7 in Leeds, for example, by Thomas Langdon.

Initially the paper cost 3 1/2d, but a change in the newspaper tax in 1797 brought the price up to 6d.; and the circulation dropped, on the paper's own figures, from about 2,700 to the region of 1,800. In 1798 the paper still claimed it could be bought in 45 market towns. There was a significant market in Scotland.

== Contributors ==
- Anna Letitia Barbauld: The first issue started publishing her Sins of Government.
- William Burdon, pro-Napoleon letters, leading to Various Thoughts on Politics, Morality and Literature (1800)
- Samuel Taylor Coleridge, who wrote his 1796 political poem Ode on the Departing Year for the Intelligencer; also Parliamentary Oscillators of 1798, as "Laberius"
- Ebenezer Elliott, The Vernal Walk (1798)
- Eliza Gould, letters in 1795; she suffered for her distribution of the Intelligencer in Devon
- Jeremiah Joyce, Account, in 1795
- Henry Crabb Robinson, in 1795, defending William Godwin's Political Justice as "Philo Godwin"
- John Towill Rutt, who contributed for example a poem against the press gang, and referencing the radical Thomas Cooper
- William Taylor

Others who contributed or who were quoted in the Intelligencer included: George Dyer, Mary Wollstonecraft, and Christopher Wyvill. Parliamentary reports were typically based on the Morning Herald. There was much verse, and the publication has been seen as a place where "few poets can refuse themselves the luxury of extended moral comment or political instruction".

== Influence ==
The Leeds Mercury of Edward Baines, and then the Manchester Guardian founded by John Edward Taylor, carried on the reformist line of the Intelligencer. Flower's model for a radical paper was tried again in Cambridge for a few years around 1820, by Weston Hatfield in his Cambridge and Hertford Independent Press. He had support from, among others, George Pryme.
