= Sarah Fuller Flower Adams =

English poet and hymnwriter (1805–1848)

Sarah Fuller Adams
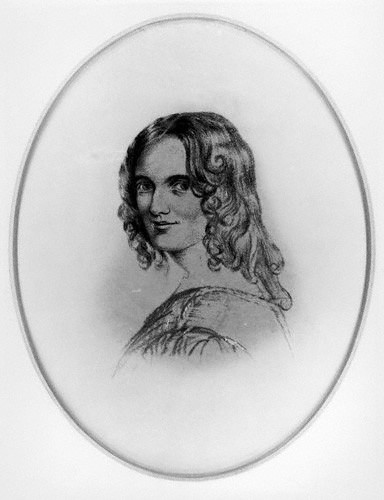
- Sketch of Sarah, a copy of a now lost 1834 sketch by Margaret Gillies
- Born: Sarah Fuller Flower; 22 February 1805; Old Harlow, Essex, England
- Died: 14 August 1848 (aged 43); London, England
- Resting place: Foster Street, Essex, England
- Occupations: Poet, hymnwriter
- Spouse: William Bridges Adams (m. 1834)
- Parent: Benjamin Flower (father)
- Relatives: William Fuller, Richard Fuller, Eliza Flower, Richard Flower, John Clayton
- Writing career
- Pen name: S.Y.
- Notable work: "Nearer, My God, to Thee"

Sarah Fuller Flower Adams (or Sally Adams) (22 February 1805 – 14 August 1848) was an English poet and hymnwriter. A selection of hymns she wrote, published by William Johnson Fox, included her best-known one, "Nearer, My God, to Thee", reportedly played by the band as the RMS Titanic sank in 1912.

== Early life and education ==
Sarah Fuller Flower was born 22 February 1805, at Old Harlow, Essex, and baptised in September 1806 at the Water Lane Independent Chapel in Bishops Stortford. She was the younger daughter of the radical editor Benjamin Flower, and his wife Eliza Gould.

Her father's mother Martha, sister of the wealthy bankers William Fuller and Richard Fuller, had died the month before Adams' birth. Her elder sister was the composer Eliza Flower. Her uncles included Richard Flower, who emigrated to the United States in 1822 and was a founder of the town of Albion, Illinois; and the nonconformist minister John Clayton.

Her mother died when she was only five years old and initially her father, a liberal in politics and religion, brought the daughters up, taking a hand in their education. The family moved to Dalston in Middlesex, where they met the writer Harriet Martineau, who was struck by the two sisters and used them for her novel "Deerbrook". In 1823, on a holiday in Scotland with friends of the radical preacher William Johnson Fox, the minister of South Place Unitarian Chapel, London, who was a frequent visitor to their home, Adams broke the female record for climbing up Ben Lomond. Back home, the girls became friends with the young poet Robert Browning, who discussed his religious doubts with Adams.

== Career ==
After the father's death, about 1825, the sisters became members of the Fox household. Both sisters began literary pursuits, and Adams first fell ill with what became tuberculosis. Soon afterwards, the sisters moved to Upper Clapton, a suburb of London. They attached themselves to the religious society worshipping in South Place, Finsbury, under the pastoral care of Fox. He encouraged and sympathized with the sisters, and they in turn helped him in his work. Eliza, the elder, devoted herself to enriching the musical part of the Chapel service, while Adams contributed hymns. Fox was one of the founders of the Westminster Review. and his Unitarian magazine, the Monthly Repository, printed essays, poems and stories by William Bridges Adams, polemicist and railway engineer, whom Adams met at the house of her friend, the feminist philosopher Harriet Taylor Mill. The two married in 1834, setting up house at Loughton in Essex. In 1837, he distinguished himself as the author of an elaborate volume on English Pleasure Carriages, and another on The Construction of Common Roads and Railroads. He was also a contributor to some of the principal reviews and newspapers.

Encouraged by her husband, Adams turned to acting and in the 1837 season at Richmond played Lady Macbeth, followed by Portia and Lady Teazle, all successes. Though offered a role at Bath, then a springboard for the West End, her health broke down and she returned to literature.

In 1841, she published her longest work, Vivia Perpetua, A Dramatic Poem. In it, a young wife who refuses to submit to male control and renounce her Christian beliefs is put to death. She contributed to the Westminster Review, including a critique of Elizabeth Barrett Browning's poetry, and wrote political verses, some for the Anti-Corn Law League. Her work often advocated equal treatment for women and for the working class. At the solicitation of her pastor, she also contributed 13 hymns to the compilation prepared by him for the use of his chapel, published 1840–41, in two parts, six in the first and seven in the second part. Of these, the two best known —" Nearer, my God! to Thee" and "He sendeth sun, he sendeth shower"— are in the second part. For this work, her sister, Eliza, wrote 62 tunes. Her only other publication, a catechism for children, entitled The Flock at the Fountain, appeared in 1845. Her hymn "Nearer, my God! to Thee" was introduced to American Christians in the Service Book, published (1844) by Rev. James Freeman Clarke, D.D., of Boston, Massachusetts, from where it was soon transferred to other collections. A selection of hymns she wrote, published by Fox, included her best-known piece, "Nearer, My God, to Thee", reportedly played by the band as the RMS Titanic sank in 1912.

== Personal life ==
A Unitarian in belief, she was hampered in her career by deafness that she had inherited from her father and, inheriting their mother's feebleness, both sisters yielded to disease in middle age. Eliza, after a lingering illness, died in December 1846 and, worn down by caring for her invalid sister, Adams' health gradually declined. She died on 14 August 1848 at the age of 43 and was buried beside her sister and parents in the Foster Street cemetery near Harlow. At her grave was sung the only other hymn of hers that was widely known, "He sendeth sun, he sendeth shower".

A blue plaque honouring the husband and wife was placed at their Loughton home: they had no children. Richard Garnett wrote of her: "All who knew Mrs. Adams personally speak of her with enthusiasm; she is described as a woman of singular beauty and attractiveness, delicate and truly feminine, high-minded, and in her days of health playful and high-spirited."

== Selected works ==
- Vivia Perpetua: a dramatic poem. In five acts, 1841
- Nearer, my God, to Thee
- "He sendeth sun, he sendeth shower"
- "Creator Spirit! Thou the first."
- "Darkness shrouded Calvary."
- "Gently fall the dews of eve."
- "Go, and watch the Autumn leaves."
- "O hallowed memories of the past."
- "O human heart! thou hast a song."
- "O I would sing a song of praise."
- "O Love! thou makest all things even."
- "Part in Peace! is day before us?"
- "Sing to the Lord! for His mercies are sure."
- "The mourners came at break of day."
