= Burdon (surname) =

Burdon is a surname. Notable people with the surname include:

== Surname ==
- Albert Burdon (1900–1981), British film actor
- Alex Burdon (1879–1943), Australian rugby league and rugby union footballer
- Allan Burdon (1914–2001), Australian politician
- Chris Burdon, sound engineer
- Eric Burdon (born 1941), English singer
- Glen Burdon (born 1954), Canadian ice-hockey player
- Hannah Burdon (1800–1877) English writer of novels
- John Burdon (1866–1933), Governor-General of British Honduras
- John Burdon-Sanderson (1828–1905), English physiologist
- John Shaw Burdon (1826–1907), English missionary to China
- Josh Burdon (born 1992), Australian racing driver
- Philip Burdon (born 1939), New Zealand politician and lawyer
- Randal Mathews Burdon (1896–1965), New Zealand soldier, sheepfarmer and historian
- Rowland Burdon (died 1838) (1757–1838), English landowner and politician
- Rowland Burdon (Sedgefield MP) (1857–1944), English landowner and politician
- William Burdon (1764–1818) an English academic, mineowner and writer
- William Burdon (MP) an English politician

== Middle name ==
- George Burdon McKean (1888–1926), English-Canadian soldier and recipient of the Victoria Cross
- Robert Burdon Stoker (1859–1919), British shipping magnate and politician
- Samuel Burdon Ellis (1787–1865), British officer in the Royal Marines

== See also ==
- Burden (surname)
- Burton (disambiguation)
