= Monthly Repository =

British Unitarian periodical (1806–1838)

The Monthly Repository was a British monthly Unitarian periodical which ran between 1806 and 1838. In terms of editorial policy on theology, the Repository was largely concerned with rational dissent. Considered as a political journal, it was radical, supporting a platform of: abolition of monopolies (including the Corn Laws); abolition of slavery; repeal of "taxes on knowledge"; extension of suffrage; national education; reform of the Church of England; and changes to the Poor Laws.

== History ==
The Monthly Repository was established when Robert Aspland bought William Vidler's Universal Theological Magazine and changed the name to the Monthly Repository of Theology and General Literature. Aspland edited the magazine until the end of 1826, when the paper was bought by the recently formed British and Foreign Unitarian Association. The "Cookites", the Methodist Unitarian movement founded by Joseph Cooke, was launched by an article in the Monthly Repository for May 1815.

A second series of the magazine, now the Monthly Repository and Review of General Literature, was begun in January 1827: the Unitarian Association's Book Department, under Thomas Rees, took direct editorial control until William Johnson Fox was appointed editor in 1828.

In 1831 Fox cut the magazine's explicit ties with Unitarianism by buying the paper, which had been making a loss, from the Association. He continued as editor-proprietor until 1836, when the magazine was briefly owned and edited by first Richard Henry Horne (1836–37) and then Leigh Hunt (1837–38).

Its price seems to have varied between 1s and 1s 6d.

== Contributors ==
Contributors included John Bowring, Lant Carpenter, George Dyer, Benjamin Flower, William Frend, Jeremiah Joyce, John Kentish, Harriet Martineau, J.S. Mill, Joseph Nightingale, John Towill Rutt, Emily Taylor, Eliza Flower and Sarah Fuller Flower Adams.
