= Hartford Hall, Northumberland =

Coordinates: 55°06′54″N 1°37′04″W

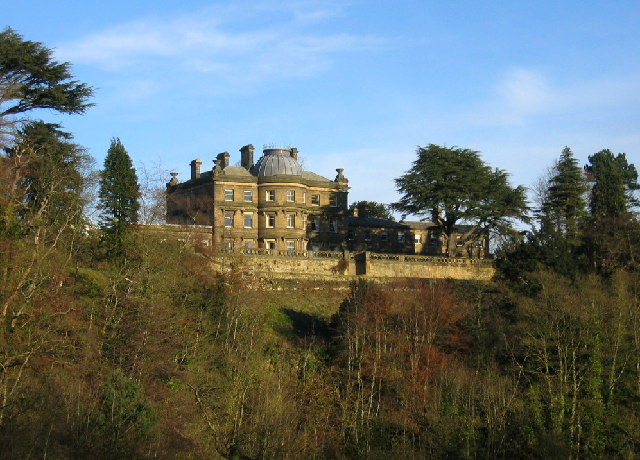
Hartford Hall

Hartford Hall, near Bedlington in Northumberland, is a building of historical significance that is Grade II* listed on the English Heritage Register. It was built in 1807 by William Burdon, a philosopher and wealthy landowner and remained in the Burdon family for the next 130 years. It then became a rehabilitation hospital. Today it is a building divided into luxury apartments.

== Owners and residents ==
William Burdon (1764–1818) who built Hartford Hall in 1807 was a wealthy landowner, author and philosopher. His father was George Burdon and his mother Hannah Wharton. He was educated at the University of Cambridge with the intention of becoming a clergyman. However in 1776 he declined to take holy orders and he moved to London. He inherited numerous estates from his uncle Richard Wharton in 1795 including the land in Bedlington.

In 1798 he married Elizabeth Dickson (1774–1806) daughter of Lieutenant General John Dickson, and the couple had five children. He spent most of his life writing scholarly books and was referred to as the philosopher of Hartford House. When he died in 1818 his eldest son William Wharton Burton inherited his estate.

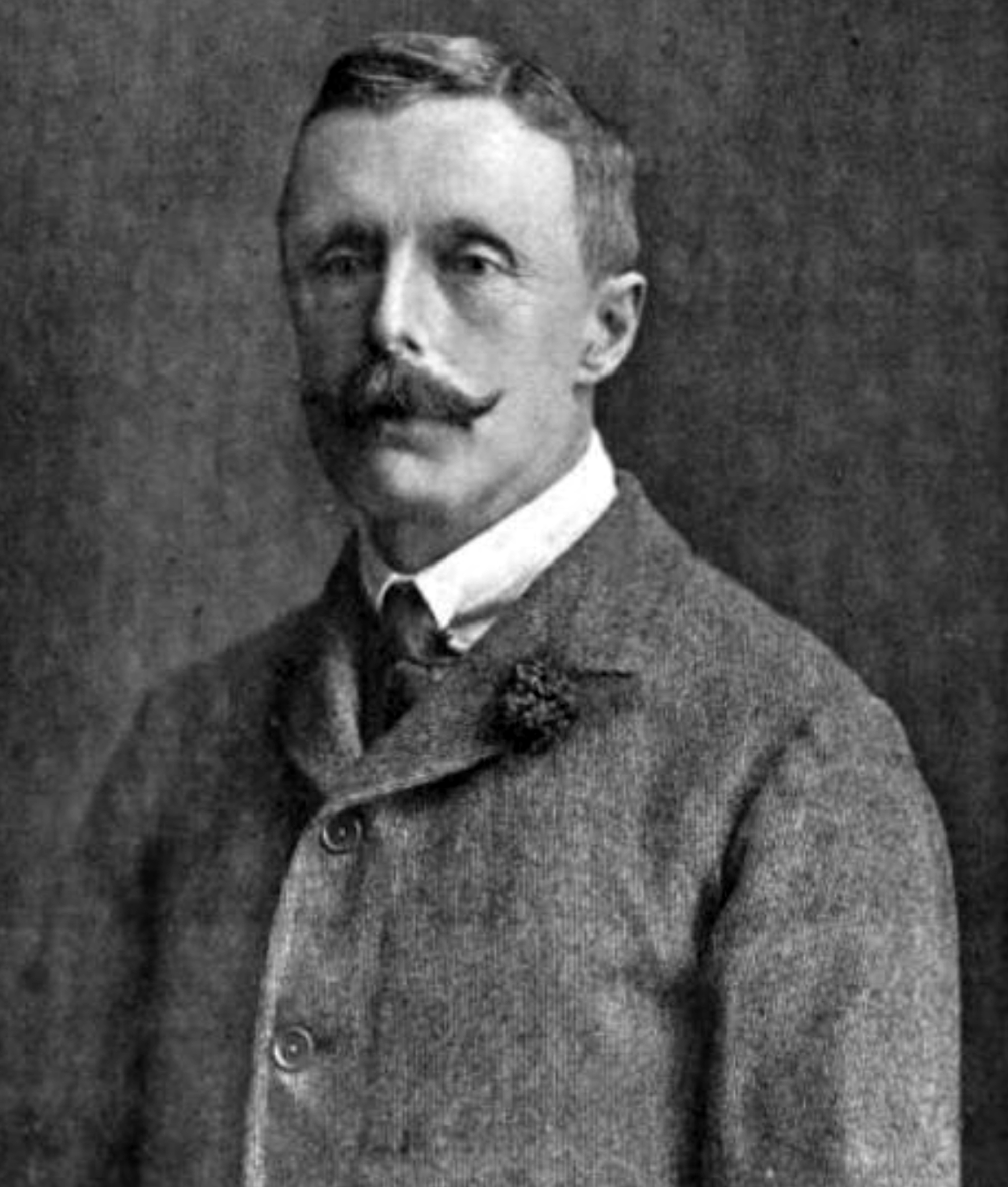
Augustus Edward Burdon

William Wharton Burton (1801–1870) was a member of Parliament and later developed the coalmines that he inherited. He did not marry, so when he died his estate was inherited by his second cousin Augustus Edward de Butts, who changed his name to Burdon.

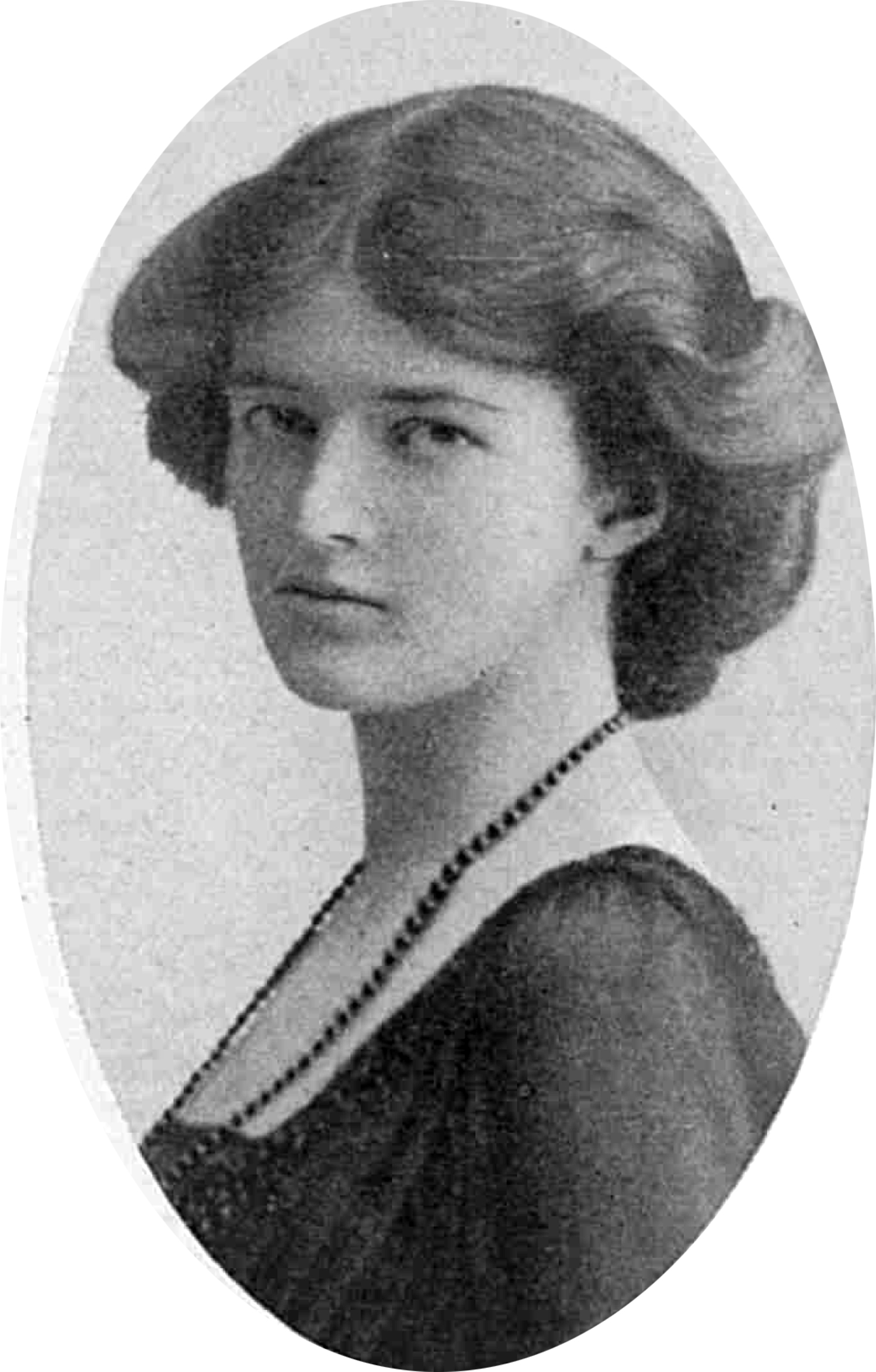
Vida Burdon, wife of Major William Wharton Burdon

Augustus Edward Burdon (1851–1908) made extensive additions to the house. He was the son of Colonel Augustus de Butts, and his mother was Hannah Inglefield, daughter of Rear Admiral Samuel Hood Inglefield. He was destined for a career in the military and was educated at the Royal Military Academy Sandhurst He did serve for a short time but left after he obtained his inheritance. He later joined the Northumberland Yeomanry Hussars and became a major. In 1875 he married Alice Gertrude Vandeleur who was the daughter of Major Thomas Vandeleur of Limerick. The couple had a son and a daughter. When Augustus died in 1908 his son Major William Wharton Burdon inherited the Hall.

Major William Wharton Burdon (1889–1964) was the last member of the Burdon family to own Hartford Hall. He took over the running of the Burdon estate when he came of age in 1910. He was educated at Eton College and the University of Cambridge and later became a Captain in the Northumberland Hussars. In 1912 he married Vida Williamson Straker who was the daughter of John Coppin Straker of Stagshaw House. The couple had one son. In 1924 the family moved out of the house and it was rented to wealthy tenants for some years. It was sold during the 1930s, and in 1944 it was opened as a rehabilitation hospital. Today it is a building divided into luxury apartments.
