= 86th Regiment of Foot (disambiguation) =

The 86th Regiment of Foot was a regiment of the British Army, raised in 1793 and amalgamated into the Royal Irish Rifles in 1881.

86th Regiment of Foot may also refer to:

- 86th Regiment of Foot (1758), formerly the 2nd battalion 76th Regiment of Foot of the British Army, raised in October 1758 for service in Africa, renumbered as the 86th Regiment in 1763 and disbanded in the same year
- 86th Regiment of Foot (Rutland Regiment), a British Army regiment raised in 1779 for service in the American Revolutionary War
