= Richard Fuller (politician, died 1782) =

British banker and politician

Richard Fuller (c. 1713 – 2 January 1782) was an English banker and politician.

== Early life ==
Some sources say he was the third son of the Reverend Joseph Fuller, a Baptist minister of Harwell in Berkshire and his wife Martha Hanson.

More likely he was the third surviving son of Thomas Fuller, a landowner at FitzHarris outside Abingdon, then in Berkshire, and his wife Hester Alder. This makes him the brother of the banker William Fuller and of Martha Fuller (1717–1805) who married the stationer George Flower (1715–1778), becoming the mother of Benjamin Flower and Richard Flower as well as mother-in-law of the Reverend John Clayton.

== Career ==
With Frazer Honywood in 1737 he became founding partner of a private bank in Lombard Street, City of London, known initially as Atkins, Honeywood & Fuller. The firm moved to Birchin Lane about 1754 and to Cornhill about 1774. In 1746 it became Honeywood & Fuller and went through several name changes until at his death it was Richard Fuller, Sons & Vaughan. By 1891, when it was taken over, it was Fuller, Banbury, Nix & Co and has since become part of the Royal Bank of Scotland.

He inherited FitzHarris from his father and, as a Berkshire landowner, was chosen High Sheriff of Berkshire in 1754.

Entering politics, at a by-election in 1764 he was elected unopposed as a Member of Parliament for Steyning in Sussex, filling the vacancy caused by Honywood's death. Changing seats, at the 1768 general election he was returned unopposed for Stockbridge in Hampshire and held that seat until the 1774 general election.

== Family ==
About 1755 he married Susanna Barnard (1735–1789) and together they had nine children. In 1768 he bought the estate called The Rookery at Westcott in Surrey, previously the home of the economist Thomas Robert Malthus, and he and his wife lived there for the rest of their lives.

In 1778, jointly with his brother William, he was executor of the will of his brother-in-law George Flower. He died on 2 January 1782 and his will of 11 October 1781 was proved on 29 January 1782. His memorial in the Independent Chapel at Dorking reads :

« To the Memory of Richard Fuller Esq of the Rookery in this County who departed this life 2 January 1782 aged sixty nine years »

Susanna survived him, dying on 11 April 1789. Of their children :

Richard Fuller entered the bank, married Frances Boulton and had five children.

Thomas Fuller was also made a partner in his father's bank, married Susannah Cromwell and in 1794 lived in Cornhill.

Lieutenant-General Sir Joseph Fuller, Knight Grand Cross of Hanover, (1771–1841) married Miranda Floyd and bought Highgate House at Eastcote, which passed to his only child Juliana Rebecca (1816–1886), wife of Sir Hugh Purves-Hume-Campbell of Marchmont, 7th Baronet (1812–1894), MP for Berwickshire.

Parliament of Great Britain
Preceded by John Thomlinson; Frazer Honywood	Member of Parliament for Steyning; 1764 – 1768; With: John Thomlinson; Sir John Filmer, Bt	Succeeded by Sir John Filmer, Bt; Thomas Edwards-Freeman
Preceded by George Prescott; Nicholas Linwood	Member of Parliament for Stockbridge; 1768 – 1774; With: Richard Worge to 1772; James Hare 1772–74	Succeeded by Hon. John Luttrell; The Lord Irnham
