= Erika Franklin Fowler =

American political scientist

Academic background
- Education: B.A., mathematics and political science, 2000, St. Olaf College; M.A., political science, 2002, PhD., political science, 2007, University of Wisconsin–Madison
- Thesis: Missing messages? elections on local television news (2007)
- Doctoral advisor: Barry Burden

Erika Franklin Fowler is an American political scientist. She is a Professor of Government at Wesleyan University, having previously served as a Robert Wood Johnson Scholar in Health Policy Research at the University of Michigan School of Public Health.

== Early life and education ==
Franklin Fowler was born to two public school teachers. She earned her Bachelor of Arts from St. Olaf College and her Master's degree and PhD in political science from the University of Wisconsin–Madison. Her thesis was titled Missing messages? elections on local television news and Barry Burden sat on her committee. While earning her PhD, one of Franklin Fowler's faculty advisors directed the Wisconsin Advertising Project and, upon his retirement, Franklin Fowler and others took over. She also co-authored a study titled Medical News for the Public to Use? What's on Local TV News which used a representative sample of the top 50 news markets to conclude that 76% of all stories involved a medical condition.

== Career ==
Upon earning her PhD, Franklin Fowler accepted a two year Robert Wood Johnson Scholarship in Health Policy Research at the University of Michigan School of Public Health. In 2010, she became an assistant professor of government at Wesleyan University and co-directed their newly launched Wesleyan Media Project (WMP). The aim of the project was to provide a non-partisan, neutral analysis of all political television advertising during the 2010 United States elections to the public. They quantified data collected during the election and concluded that the tone of advertisements during the campaign were equal to those in 2008. Following the same idea, in 2013 she co-published Negative, angry, and ubiquitous: Political advertising in 2012 with Travis N. Ridout. Together, they quantified the data of 3 million campaign ads during the 2012 United States elections and concluded that three-quarters of all ads in the presidential race were negative in tone.

During the 2015–16 academic year, Franklin Fowler co-authored a book with Michael M. Franz and Travis N. Ridout titled Political Advertising in the United States. The book was a survey of how political advertising influenced voters. She was subsequently granted tenure by the Wesleyan Board of Trustees.

Following the 2018–19 academic year, Franklin Fowler received Wesleyan's Binswanger Prizes for Excellence in Teaching. By the conclusion of the 2019–20 academic year, it was announced that she would be promoted to Full professor of government at Wesleyan on July 1, 2020.
