= Hardy progeny of the North =

The phrase "hard progeny of the North" is a misquotation from the autobiography (1792) of Gilbert Wakefield. He wrote that

"It is observed at Cambridge, and is generally true, that the hardy progeny of the North, from Cumberland, Westmoreland, and the remoter parts of Yorkshire, are usually the profoundest proficients in Mathematics and Philosophy."

An exhibition at Lancaster University in 1976 took it as title.

== Background ==
The "hard progeny" were educated in the region's grammar schools which were small and typically situated in rural market towns. In an era prior to the dominance of the great public schools, grammar schools were the most important source of entrants to Oxford and Cambridge universities, at least of entrants with serious academic aspirations, especially in north-west England.

Richard Watson was described as:

one of 'the hard progeny of the North' who were to enrich British science for a century and more.

— The 1702 Chair of Chemistry at Cambridge: Transformation and Change

Colin Russell refers to:

These men of science, as well as many others, have been called "the hard progeny of the North," and it seems that the inhospitable climate and the rough terrain must have been one factor in promoting a certain toughness of mind that is so necessary in the pursuit of science.

— Michael Faraday: Physics and Faith

== The principal individuals ==
- Richard Watson (1737-1816), mathematician; Cambridge professor of chemistry, then theology; Bishop of Llandaff.
- Thomas Garnett (1766-1802), physician; professor of natural philosophy at Glasgow, then at the Royal Institution.
- John Dawson (1734-1820), surgeon, mathematician and notable tutor of mathematics.
- Adam Sedgwick (1784-1873), a founder of modern geology; an opponent of evolution.
- William Whewell [1794-1866), natural and moral philosopher; philosopher and historian of science.
- Richard Owen (1804-1892), comparative anatomist, palaeontologist, invented the word "dinosaur".
- Edward Frankland (1825-1899), pioneering professor of chemistry.
- William Turner (1832-1916), professor of anatomy and first English Principal of Edinburgh University.
