= Thomas Burton (MP for Westmorland) =

English politician

Thomas Burton (died 1661), of Brampton Hall, Westmorland, was an English politician, the Member of Parliament for Westmorland from 1656 to 1659, now known as a parliamentary diarist.

== Life ==
He was a justice of the peace for Westmorland. He was returned to parliament as member for the county on 20 August 1656. On 16 October 1656 he was called upon by the parliament to answer a charge of disaffection towards the existing government, which he did to the satisfaction of the house. Burton was re-elected for Westmorland to Richard Cromwell's parliament, which met on 27 January 1659 and was dissolved on 22 April 1659. He did not sit in parliament after the Restoration of 1660. Although he spoke rarely, he is assumed to have been a regular attender in the House of Commons.

== Diary ==
Burton has been identified as the author of a diary of parliamentary proceedings from 1656 to 1659. The authorship was in dispute during the nineteenth century, as reported by Sidney Lee in the Dictionary of National Biography, Thomas Carlyle having suggested Nathaniel Bacon; later research has confirmed the author as Burton, according to Ivan Roots in the Oxford Dictionary of National Biography. It was edited and published in four volumes in 1828 by John Towill Rutt, a key record of proceedings in the Parliaments of 1656–1659.

In the record the speeches are given in direct speech. The Diary, in the form in which it is now known, opens abruptly on Wednesday, 3 December 1656. It continues uninterruptedly till 26 June 1657. A second section deals with the period between 20 January 1658 and 4 February 1658, and a third with that between 27 January 1659 and 22 April 1659.

The Diary was first printed in 1828, by Rutt, from the author's notebooks, which had come into the possession of William Upcott, librarian of the London Institution. The manuscripts, which form six oblong 12mo volumes, are now in the British Library (Add MSS 15859–15864), and bear no author's name. The editor prefixed extracts from the Journal of Guibon Goddard, M.P., dealing with the parliament of 1654.
