= Richard Worge =

MP and Governor of Senegal

Major-General Richard Worge

Member of the British House of Commons for Stockbridge
- In office 1768–1772
- Preceded by: George Prescott
- Succeeded by: James Hare

Personal details
- Born: 1707
- Died: 4 May 1774 (aged 66–67)
- Children: 1 daughter

Military service
- Allegiance: Great Britain
- Years of service: 1732–1770
- Battles/wars: War of the Austrian Succession; Battle of Fontenoy; Battle of Culloden

Major-General Richard Alchorne Worge (1707 – 4 May 1774) was an English General in the British Army, Governor of Senegal, and a Member of Parliament for Stockbridge.

He was born the second son of Thomas Worge of Eastbourne, Sussex, and joined the Army around 1724.

He was promoted to lieutenant in the 11th Foot in 1732, captain in the 25th Foot in 1738, major in 1745, and lieutenant-colonel of the 9th Foot in 1754. During that time, he was severely wounded at the Battle of Fontenoy, took part in the Battle of Culloden, and served in Flanders.

In 1759, during the Seven Years' War, he was made lieutenant-colonel commanding the newly formed 86th Foot and sailed with them to the newly captured Island of Gorée, off the coast of Senegal. From Gorée, he administered the former French territory of Senegal as Governor until his return to England after the Treaty of Paris in 1763. He was promoted to colonel of the army in 1762 and raised to major-general in 1770.

He was returned to Parliament in 1768 as a member for Stockbridge, sitting until taking the Chiltern Hundreds in 1772.

Worge died in 1774 and was buried at St Mary the Virgin Church, Old Town, Eastbourne, East Sussex.

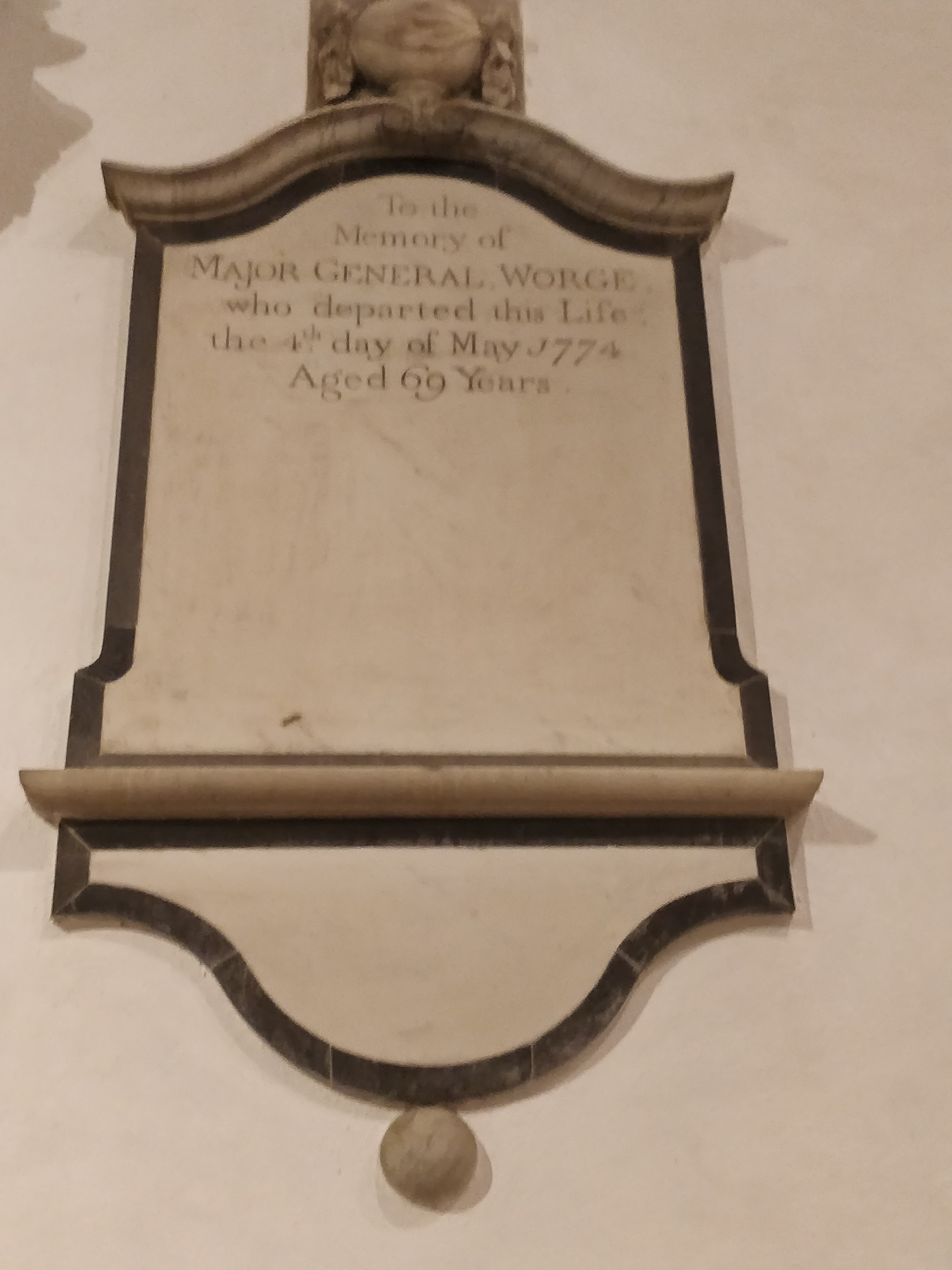
Memorial tablet of Richard Alchorne Worge in At Mary the Virgin Eastbourne

He had married Jane Bowman of Ormskirk, Lancashire and had one daughter.

Parliament of Great Britain
Preceded by George Prescott; Nicholas Linwood	Member of Parliament for Stockbridge; 1768 – 1772; With: Richard Fuller	Succeeded by James Hare; Richard Fuller
