= Eliza Flower =

British musician and composer (1803–1846)

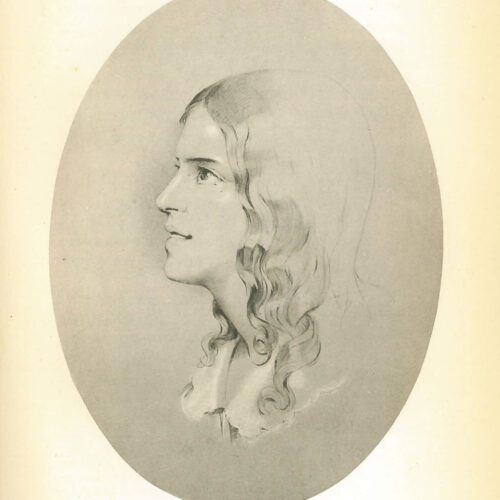
- Born: 1803; Harlow, Essex
- Died: 12 December 1846 (aged 42–43); Hurstpierpoint
- Era: Romantic
- Notable work: "Nearer, My God, to Thee"
- Parents: Benjamin Flower (father); Eliza Gould (mother)
- Relatives: Sarah Fuller Flower Adams (sister)

Eliza Flower (1803 – 12 December 1846) was a British musician and composer. In addition to her own work, Flower became known for her friendships including those with William Johnson Fox, Robert Browning, John Stuart Mill and Harriet Taylor.

== Biography ==
Flower was born at Harlow, Essex in 1803 to radical journalist Benjamin Flower and philanthropist Eliza Gould. Her younger sister was the poet Sarah Fuller Flower Adams. From the age of four, Eliza Flower showed a promising aptitude for music and composition. Flower, her father and her sister were all regular contributors to Unitarian minister William Johnson Fox's periodical the Monthly Repository. Following Benjamin Flower's death, Eliza and Sarah lived with Fox as his wards until Sarah's marriage in 1834 to William Bridges Adams, and Eliza's death in 1846. Fox was married (and separated) and his friendship with Eliza Flower, and their living arrangements, though platonic, brought rumour and social ostracism towards her. Flower and Fox were friends with unmarried couple, politician and philosopher John Stuart Mill and women's rights advocate Harriet Taylor.

Flower's first published musical work was Four Musical Illustrations of the Waverley Novels in 1831, setting to music several of Sir Walter Scott's romantic songs. She later wrote music for works by her sister, including her hymn "Nearer, My God, to Thee", which formed part of a collection by Fox called Hymns and Anthems. Her chorus Now pray we for our Country achieved some popularity. She wrote music sung at the funeral of Hindu reformist Ram Mohan Roy. During her lifetime, reviewers considered her the greatest female composer. The Musical Times of January 1846 says – "The selection of Sacred Music from the works of Miss Eliza Flower was repeated to a very full audience on the 10th at Crosby Hall, and highly delighted a very crowded audience".

Flower died on 12 December 1846 from consumption while at Hurstpierpoint, near Brighton.

== Friendship with Robert Browning ==
Flower and her sister Sarah became acquainted with the young poet Robert Browning. Flower was shown a manuscript of Browning's Incondita, a collection of poems written at the age of 12, by his mother. Impressed, Flower showed them to W. J. Fox. Fox also liked the poems but convinced Browning that they were not good enough for publication. The poems were eventually destroyed by Browning, with much of his other work, in 1884. Browning developed a boyish love for Flower, nine years his senior, and remained fond of her until her death. She was the inspiration for his poem "Pauline".

== Works ==
- 1831: Four Musical Illustrations of the Waverley Novels
- 1832: "The Gathering of the Unions"
- 1834: Songs of the Seasons
- 1841: Hymns and Anthems (including "Nearer, My God, to Thee")
