= Hewson Clarke =

English author

Hewson Clarke (bapt. 18 March 1787 – bur. 21 May 1817) was an English writer, known for historical works. In literary circles he became unpopular by satirising Lord Byron.

== Life ==
Clarke was born in Maryport, Cumberland, and went to work for a Mr. Huntley, a chemist and druggist, in Gateshead. His early journalism brought him support from William Burdon, and a sizarship at Emmanuel College, Cambridge. He left Cambridge without a degree, and went to London, where he edited The Scourge, a monthly publication, contributed to The Satirist, and engaged in jobbing literary work.

Clarke attacked characters so different as Joanna Southcott and Lord Byron. In The Satirist, Clarke libelled Byron, who in return wrote that he was "a living libel on mankind".

From April to August 1811, he was committed to a debtors' prison in London. He died six years later in London. He was buried at St Dunstan-in-the-West Church on Fleet Street.

There was doubt at the time as to the date of Clarke's death, with Eneas Mackenzie in 1827 asserting that he was already dead, "unnoticed and unlamented". Richard Welford in Men of Mark 'twixt Tyne and Tweed (1895) claimed he died in 1817, "seized with madness." Letters to Richard Alfred Davenport from Canada falsely claim he had emigrated, and was in Chambly, Quebec in 1845.

== Works ==
Clarke contributed to the Tyne Mercury a series of papers, later expanded and published in The Saunterer (Newcastle, 1805, 2nd ed. 1806). His major works were:

- An impartial History of the Naval, Military, and Political Events in Europe, from the commencement of the French Revolution to the entrance of the Allies into Paris, and the conclusion of a general peace (2 vols. Bungay, 1815; new edition, 3 vols. London, 1816);
- The Cabinet of Arts (with John Dougall, 1821);
- A Continuation of Hume's History of England (2 vols. 1832).
- The History of the War from the Commencement of the French Revolution, T. Kinnersley, 1816.

== Notes ==
Attribution

This article incorporates text from a publication now in the public domain: Stephen, Leslie, ed. (1887). "Clarke, Hewson". Dictionary of National Biography. Vol. 10. London: Smith, Elder & Co.
