= Turner Doomsday Video =

End of world broadcast for CNN

- A snapshot from the first few seconds of the Turner Doomsday Video. The Christian hymn "Nearer, My God, to Thee" is performed by multiple members of the U.S. Army, Navy, Air Force, and Marine bands.
- Country of origin: United States

Production
- Producer: Ted Turner
- Running time: 1 minute

The Turner Doomsday Video is the internal title of an apocalyptic video intended to be broadcast by CNN at the end of the world. The video, created at the direction of CNN founder Ted Turner before the network's 1980 launch, is a performance of the Christian hymn "Nearer, My God, To Thee" performed by multiple members of the U.S. Army, Navy, Air Force, and Marine bands in front of CNN's original headquarters at the Turner Broadcasting Techwood Campus in Midtown Atlanta, Georgia.

== History ==
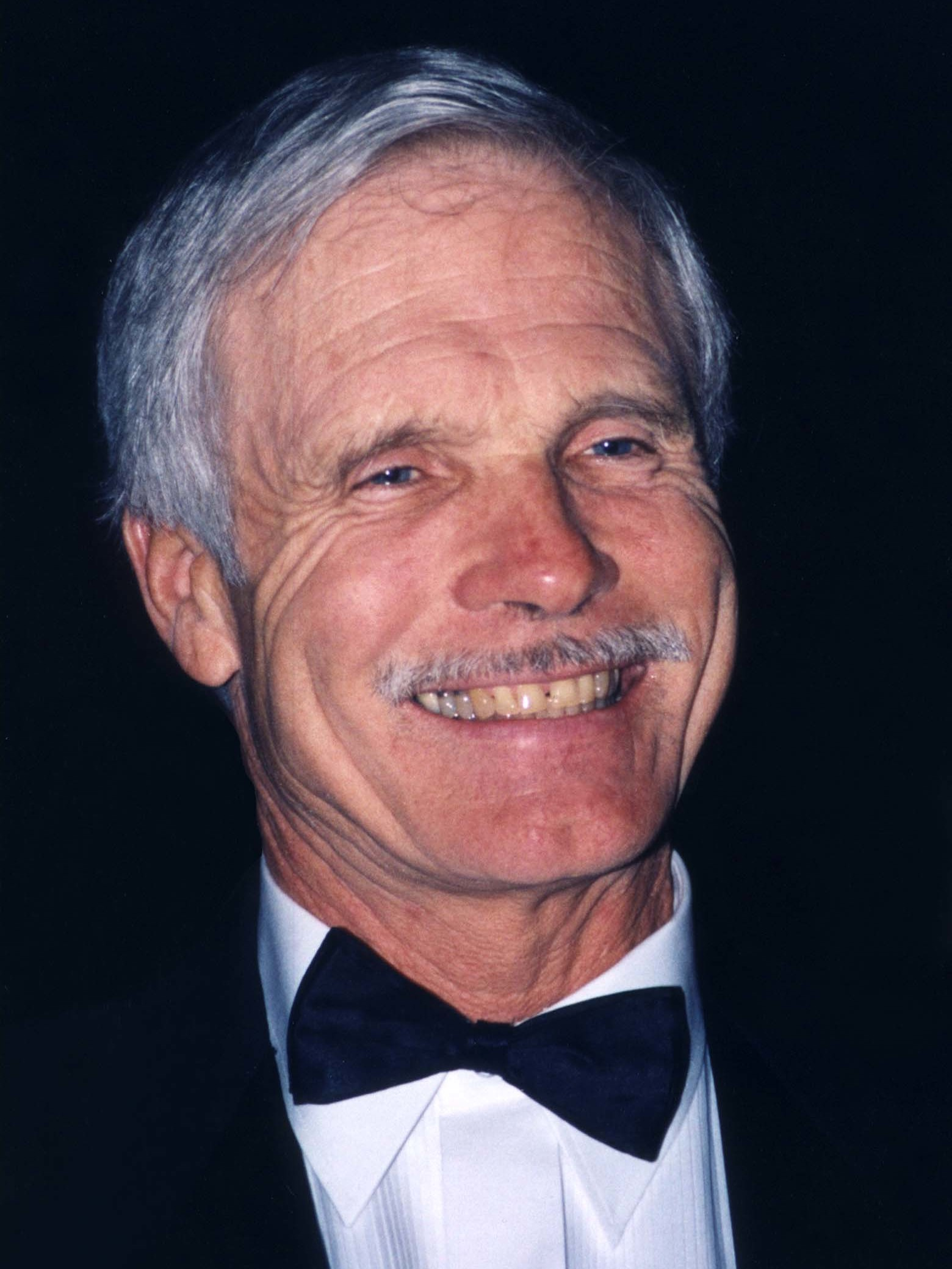
Ted Turner in 1999

The recording was made right after "The Star-Spangled Banner" was recorded for CNN's sign-on (which also appeared in TNT's sign-on from 1988). After they recorded it, Turner asked if they would record a song just in case the world came to an end. At CNN's launch, Ted Turner declared, "Barring satellite problems, we won't be signing off until the world ends":

We'll be on, and we will cover it [the end of the world] live, and that will be our last, last event. We'll play the National Anthem only one time, on the first of June [1980], and when the end of the world comes, we'll play "Nearer My God To Thee" before we sign off.

The video is in standard definition and the 4:3 aspect ratio in use during the time of its production.

=== Leakage ===
The footage of the Turner Doomsday Video was leaked by former CNN intern Michael Ballaban, who posted the footage on YouTube. He found out about the video while working at CNN as an intern, after hearing about it from a professor who had ties with CNN. The source who provided Ballaban the video had also taken screenshots of its home in CNN's Mira archive in where the file name was under the all-caps heading of “TURNER DOOMSDAY VIDEO" with a stated restriction of "HFR [hold for release] till end of the world confirmed -- contact[...]” It is unknown who the restriction states to contact regarding release.

== In popular culture ==
Rumors of the video have existed as early as 1988, when The New Yorker published an article describing it. However, the video did not become available to the public until 2015, when a writer for Jalopnik revealed a copy of the video that he had recorded during a 2009 internship.

In the 1990 comedy film Gremlins 2: The New Batch, the character Daniel Clamp has a similar "end of civilization" video ready to air on his news network. After the leak of the CNN video, director Joe Dante joked, "I think ours was better."

The 1994 British television satirical comedy series The Day Today features such a broadcast in Episode 3, after Queen Elizabeth II and then Prime Minister John Major had a fight. The film consists of a sequence of subtly humorous scenarios (stockbrokers spend "playtime" outside the London Stock Exchange jumping and skipping; a paramedic comforting an injured old woman gives her a brief kiss on the cheek; a man with a cigarette gets the offer of a light from a group of six-year-olds), all set against a backdrop of patriotic British music.

In response to the leak, National Public Radio undertook a search of their archives for similar recordings, and "found" one — or, rather, NPR produced a satirical send-up of such an "end of the world" recording that poked fun at the network's own reputation. An "excerpt" was broadcast on the January 10, 2015 edition of Weekend Edition. The recording is of Robert Siegel (as identified in the transcript, since the speaker in the recording quips, "I'm — well, who cares? I won't be for long.") announcing special coverage of the end of the world (specifically one from an imminent asteroid impact). In the recording, Siegel announces the approach of the asteroid, confidently remarks that NPR would have the best analysis of the impact the day after, and assures listeners that they can still become members of their local public radio station.

== See also ==
- Sign-on and sign-off
