= Benjamin Flower =

English journalist (1755–1829)

- Born: 1755; London, England
- Died: 1829 (aged 73–74)
- Occupation: Journalist

Benjamin Flower (1755 – 17 February 1829) was an English radical journalist and political writer, and a vocal opponent of his country's involvement in the early stages of the Napoleonic Wars.

== Early life ==
He was born in London, the son of a prosperous tradesman, George Flower, and Martha Fuller, sister of William Fuller. Richard Flower, who helped found Albion, Illinois and wrote on the English Settlement in the state, was his brother, and Richard's sons George Flower (cofounder of the Settlement) and Edward Fordham Flower therefore his nephews. His sister Mary married John Clayton.

Attending several schools, from 1766 Flower was at the dissenting academy of John Collett Ryland, an associate of his father, in Northampton.

Flower was given a legacy in 1778, when his father died, but lost the money in speculations. John Clayton took this badly, and blackened Flower's reputation, breaking also the family link. to a share in his father's business. Flower was in business in 1783 with William Creak, a London dealer in tea, but Clayton interfered, and Flower had to take a job as a clerk.

== Radical and publisher ==
From the early 1780s Flower belonged to the Society for Constitutional Information. In 1785 he accepted an engagement to travel in business on the Continent for half the year, spending the other half with the textile Smale & Dennys at Tiverton. He visited the Netherlands, Germany, and Switzerland, and spent six months in France in 1791.

In 1793 Flower printed William Frend's Peace and Union Recommended in its second edition, and in 1794 The Fall of Robespierre, by Samuel Taylor Coleridge and Robert Southey.

In 1793 Flower became editor of the Cambridge Intelligencer, and held the post to 1803. The historian J. E. Cookson called it "the most vigorous and outspoken liberal periodical of its day".

In 1799 Flower was summoned before the House of Lords, for remarks made in the Intelligencer against Richard Watson, bishop of Llandaff, whose political conduct he had censured. After a short hearing he was adjudged guilty of a breach of privilege, and sentenced to six months in Newgate Prison and a fine. Flower's attempts to obtain revision of the proceedings by application to the court of king's bench were unsuccessful.

== Later life ==
On his release, Flower gave up his newspaper, and established himself in business as a printer at Harlow in Essex. In 1808 he brought a legal action against his cousin John Clayton, junior, winning token damages. In his last years he retired to Dalston. There William Johnson Fox became a family friend, touring the Highlands with the Flowers, after they had been brought together by Southwood Smith.

Flower died at Dalston on 17 February 1829. He was buried in the non-conformist burying ground at Foster Street near Harlow. Fox became guardian to his daughters, eventually at the cost of his own marriage.

== Views ==
An advocate of the French republic, Flower was not a republican at home. His paper was identified by opponents as an organ for Rational Dissent. As a publisher he undertook joint ventures with Joseph Cottle, Joseph Johnson, and Henry Symonds who had published Rights of Man.

In religion Flower was a conservative Unitarian, according to the Dictionary of National Biography. On the other hand, E. P. Thompson identifies the Cambridge circle of Coleridge, Flower, and Frend, with George Dyer, John Prior Estlin and Gilbert Wakefield, as "radical Unitarians".

Flower testified to his own background, stating that his father was a deacon at White's Row Meeting-house in Spitalfields, an Independent congregation. St Andrew's Street Baptist Church, Cambridge, the 'Stone-Yard Chapel', was noted for the reformers in its congregation; Flower edited the works of Robert Robinson, the pastor there.

== Works ==
Flower wrote a work on the French constitution (1792), in fact a loose attack on the alleged defects of the British one.

Flower edited the Cambridge Intelligencer, from 1793 to 1803. His brother Richard, a farmer and staunch liberal, had a considerable share in establishing the publication. It was almost the only provincial newspaper in the country which denounced the war with France, and advocated the removal of the grievances of the English Dissenters on the broad grounds of religious liberty. The first issue started publishing the Sins of Government by Anna Letitia Barbauld. Flower's hostility to the war was again expressed in National Sins Considered (1796).

Flower carried on a monthly magazine, The Political Register, from 1807 to 1811. His other publications were the Life of Robinson accompanying the works, a preface to his brother Richard's Letters from Illinois, and some pamphlets on family affairs.

== Family ==
He was visited in prison by Eliza Gould, who had herself suffered for her liberal opinions. Shortly after his release he married her. She died in 1810, leaving him two daughters, the composer Eliza Flower and the poet Sarah Fuller Flower Adams.
