= John Towill Rutt =

English political activist, social reformer and nonconformist man of letters

John Towill Rutt (4 April 1760 – 3 March 1841) was an English political activist, social reformer and nonconformist man of letters.

== Life ==
Born in London on 4 April 1760, he was only son of George Rutt, at first a druggist in Friday Street, Cheapside, and afterwards a wholesale merchant in drugs in Upper Thames Street, who married Elizabeth Towill. In early boyhood he was placed for some time under the care of Joshua Toulmin at Taunton. On 1 July 1771 he was admitted at St. Paul's School, London, under Dr. Richard Roberts. The headmaster recommended his parents to send him to university, but they were strict nonconformists, and would not accept the advice. Rutt went into his father's business, and continued there for most of his life.

In 1780 Rutt joined the Society for Constitutional Information. At the time of the French Revolution he became an original and active member of the Society of the Friends of the People. Concern for the reformers Thomas Muir, Thomas Fyshe Palmer and William Skirving led him to visit them as convicts on board the hulks, when awaiting transportation, and he sent papers and pamphlets to them in New South Wales. He was a vigorous public speaker. His religious convictions gradually became Unitarian, and by 1796 he was a leading member of the Gravel Pit congregation at Hackney, of which Thomas Belsham was the pastor. He was on close terms of friendship with Joseph Priestley and Gilbert Wakefield. He supported Priestley after the riots in Birmingham, and he was one of Wakefield's bail, smoothing matters after his incarceration in Dorchester gaol. Another intimate friend was Henry Crabb Robinson.

On his partial withdrawal from business about 1800 Rutt lived for some years at Whitegate House, near Witham in Essex, and afterwards at Clapton and Bromley-by-Bow, before he finally settled at Bexley. As a member of the Clothworkers' Company he worked in the administration of the company's charities, and he laid the first stone of the Domestic Society's school and chapel in Spicer Street, Spitalfields.

He died at Bexley on 3 March 1841.

== Works ==
He aided in founding the Monthly Repository, was a regular contributor to its columns, and occasionally acted as its editor; he also wrote in the Christian Reformer. In 1802 he edited a Unitarian Collection of Prayers, Psalms, and Hymns.

Rutt was the author of a volume of poetry for Thomas Fyshe Palmer, entitled The Sympathy of Priests. Addressed to T. F. Palmer, at Port Jackson. With Odes, 1792. In conjunction with Arnold Wainewright, he published in 1804 an enlarged edition, brought down to the date of death, of the Memoirs of Gilbert Wakefield, originally published by Wakefield in 1792.

The years between 1817 and 1831 were chiefly spent in editing the ‘Theological and Miscellaneous Works of Dr. Priestley’ in twenty-five volumes, portions of which were subsequently issued separately. The first volume Rutt separately issued as Life and Correspondence of Joseph Priestley, 1831–2, 2 vols. Rutt also edited with notes, historical and biographical, the Diary of Thomas Burton, M.P., 1656 to 1659 (1828), Calamy's Historical Account of my own Life, 1671–1731 (1830), and The Life, Journals, and Correspondence of Samuel Pepys. With a Narrative of his Voyage to Tangier (1841). He contributed articles to the Encyclopædia Metropolitana.

== Family ==
He married, in June 1786, Rachel, second daughter of Joseph Pattisson of Maldon, Essex. They had thirteen children, seven of whom, with his widow, survived him. Rachel, the eldest daughter, married Thomas Noon Talfourd.
