= J. B. Burden =

Australian pharmacist (c1855–1922)

John Britten Burden (c. 1855 – 15 August 1922) was a pharmacist in Adelaide, South Australia.

== History ==
Burden was a son of pharmacist Thomas Burden (25 Aug 1817 – 28 Jul 1875) and Sarah Elizabeth Burden, née Good (2 Nov 1824 – 13 Jan 1878) of London, and educated at the City of London School, gaining qualifications as a pharmacist and membership of the Pharmaceutical Society of Great Britain. He worked at this profession at St Leonards in London, and in Italy, before leaving for the colony of South Australia around 1882 or early 1883, to manage the 153 Rundle Street pharmacy of W. H. Harrison, while he was in England gaining qualifications in dentistry. It may be no coincidence that Burden was a nephew of successful Adelaide businessmen C. H. Goode and Thomas Good, who each married a sister of the other.

Burden established his own pharmacy at 48 King William Street by 1886, and a second shop in Henley Beach around 1911.

In 1948 the business was sold to Douglas Finlayson, who already had pharmacies in Grote and Pulteney streets, but retained the old business name. and before 1952 joined by another at 73a Hindley Street. It was later a member of Federal Pharmaceutical Service Guild of Australia. A similarly branded shop was opened on Torrens Road, Kilkenny, opposite Arndale.

== Other interests ==
Burden was an active member of the Adelaide Chess Club, and a one-time club champion.

== Family ==
He married Martha Williams in 1891. They had two sons

- Clive Britten Burden (1892 – 10 May 1917) was educated at the public schools and Prince Alfred College, and was a medical student at the University of Adelaide University at the outbreak of the Great War. In August 1916, having qualified as a medical practitioner, he enlisted with the First AIF and was appointed to the A.A.M.C. with the rank of Captain. and stationed with Australian troops camped on Salisbury Plain, then transferred to the No. 2 Australian Base Hospital in France. He was later transferred, at his own request, to the 6th Divisional Field Ambulance of the A.I.F., commanded by Major Kenneth Fry, serving in the trenches for a month, when he contracted measles and was invalided to England. While convalescing, he was struck by a train at Victoria Station, London, and died from his injuries, remarking to a bystander the irony of his circumstances.
- (John) Harold Burden (1892 – 23 December 1919), married Dorothy and died at Berri, aged 27.

=== Siblings ===
Burden had three siblings in South Australia:

- Florence Annie Burden (c. 1867 – 13 June 1954) married Daniel John Smith on 2 April 1895.
- Dr Frank Burden (July 1868 – 1961?) arrived in Adelaide c. August 1899. He married Joanne Turner Webster; they were missionaries to China, 1890–1899 later lived at 391 The Esplanade, Henley Beach.

- Gordon William Burden (11 December 1899 – 1987) married Marjorie Rosevere Hicks (1899–1999) on 7 June 1924, later of Berri.

- Kate Burden ( – 23 January 1939)
