= Hannah Burdon =

English novelist

- Born: 1800; Morpeth, Northumberland
- Died: 1877 (aged 76–77); Rapperswil, Switzerland
- Writing career
- Language: English

Hannah Dorothy Burdon (1800–1877) was an English writer of novels. She initially wrote historical novels under the name "Miss Burdon" or, after her marriage in 1841, "Madame Wolfensberger". After the death of her husband in 1850, she turned to write social and political novels under the pseudonym "Lord B*******".

== Life ==
Hannah Burdon was born in 1800. She was the daughter of the mineowner and political writer William Burdon. In 1836 she published her first historical novel Seymour of Sudley; or, the last of the Franciscans. In 1841 she married the Swiss landscape painter Johann Jakob Wolfensberger. After his death in 1850 she began writing social-problem novels beginning with Masters and Workmen (1851). Her novels from this time onwards were written anonymously under the pseudonym "Lord B*******". Because of this pseudonym, her later works were erroneously attributed to Frederick Richard Chichester, the Earl of Belfast. Later in life she married Daniel Jerome Schobinger in Switzerland. She died in 1877 in Rapperswil, Switzerland.

== Works ==
- Published under the name "Miss Burdon" or as "Madame Wolfensberger":
  - Seymour of Sudley: or, The Last of the Franciscans, 1836, 3 vols.
  - The Lost Evidence, 1838, 3 vols.
  - The Friends of Fontainbleau, 1839, 3 vols.
  - The Thirst for Gold, 1841, 3 vols.
  - The Pope and the Actor: An Historical Novel, 1842, 3 vols.
  - The Forester's Daughter: A Tale of the Reformation, 1844, 3 vols.
  - The Ward of the Crown: A Historical Novel, 1845, 3 vols
  - All Classes: A Novel, 1847, 3 vols
- Published under the pseudonym "Lord B*******" or "Lord B******m":
  - Masters and Workmen, a Tale, 1851, 3 vols.
  - The Farce of Life, 1852, 3 vols.
  - Wealth and Labour, 1858, 3 vols.
  - The County Magistrate, 1858, 3 vols.
  - Naples, Political, Social, and Religious, 1856, 2 vols.; and
  - The Fate of Folly, 1859, 3 vols
  - Uncle Armstrong, a Narrative, 1866, 3 vols
