= William Burden =

William Burden may refer to:

- William Burden (tenor), American tenor
- William Fletcher Burden (1830–1867), American industrialist
- William A. M. Burden Sr. (1877–1909), American football player and stock broker
- William Douglas Burden (1898–1978), American naturalist and author
- William A. M. Burden (1906–1984), American Ambassador to Belgium
- Doug Burden (William Douglas Burden, born 1965), American rower
