= 86th Regiment of Foot (1758) =

- Active: 1758–1763
- Country: Kingdom of Great Britain (1707–1800)
- Branch: British Army
- Type: Infantry

Commanders
- Colonel of the Regiment: General Richard Alchorne Worge

The 86th Regiment of Foot was a short-lived infantry regiment in the British Army which was raised in 1758, during the Seven Years' War with France, by redesignation of the 2nd Battalion, 61st Regiment of Foot.

In 1758 the regiment embarked at Kinsale for Gorée, off the coast of Senegal, both of which had been recently captured from the French. There it served on garrison duty until it was disbanded in 1763 following the Treaty of Paris.

The Colonel-Commandant of the Regiment throughout its life was General Richard Alchorne Worge, who also acted as Governor of Senegal during their time at Gorée and who became a Member of Parliament on his return to England.
