= William Fuller (banker) =

English banker

William Fuller (1705–1800) was an English banker, at his death reputed to be one of the richest people in the country.

== Early life ==
Born in Abingdon-on-Thames in Berkshire (now Oxfordshire), Fuller went to London at age 14, as apprentice to a writing master. He went into business on his own, in that trade, in Fenchurch Street; and then set up a writing school in Lothbury. He had his son trained in accounts, and placed in a bank; he then joined his son in banking.

== Banker ==
The London bank William Fuller & Son was founded "at the sign of the Artichoke", later 24 Lombard Street, around 1769. At the end of the century the firm's style was Fuller & Chatteris. It eventually failed in 1841, when it was known as Whitmore, Wells and Whitmore.

== Religious views and charitable activities ==
Fuller was in the congregation of Samuel Pike, who became a Sandemanian. Fuller, however, opposed the influence of Robert Sandeman, and campaigned against it, in a 1759 pamphlet Reflections on an Epistolary Correspondence between S.P. and R.S.. Controversy ensued, but Pike was expelled by his congregation. By the end of his life, Fuller was considered a rigid Calvinist.

Fuller donated an estimated £60,000 to numerous causes, over the course of his life, in particular giving support to nonconformism. He was involved in the King's Head Society, and by eight annual major donations sustained the Congregational Fund Board. One beneficiary was a dissenting academy at Heckmondwike. Fuller founded six almshouses in Hoxton in 1794, and six more just before his death.

== Family and legacy ==
Fuller married Bethia Wellingham from St Paul's Walden in 1734, before his move to Lothbury. At his death in March 1800, he left £600,000. His son Thomas had died a bachelor in 1796 and his youngest daughter Esther, wife of Joshua Ellis, in January 1800. In 1803 his second daughter Mary died, followed by the eldest Sarah in 1810, neither having married. His whole fortune then passed to his only grandchild Bethia Ellis (1781–1865), who in December 1800 had married Ebenezer Maitland.

Fuller's brother Richard Fuller was also a banker, at 84 Cornhill, London. His sister Martha (1718–1805) married the stationer George Flower, and was mother of Richard Flower and Benjamin Flower.
