= William Burdon =

English academic, mineowner and writer

William Burdon (1764–1818) was an English academic, mineowner and writer.

== Life ==
Burdon was born at Newcastle-upon-Tyne, the son of George Burdon, was educated at Newcastle grammar school, and went to Emmanuel College, Cambridge in 1782. He graduated B.A. 1786, and M.A. 1788, when he was elected a Fellow of his college.

In the early times of the French Revolution, Burdon's views were republican, but he later modified them. He resigned his fellowship in 1806, on declining to take holy orders, and moved to London; it is thought he had suffered a crisis of faith. He was later an associate of George Cannon, and published in his Theological Enquirer as W.B.

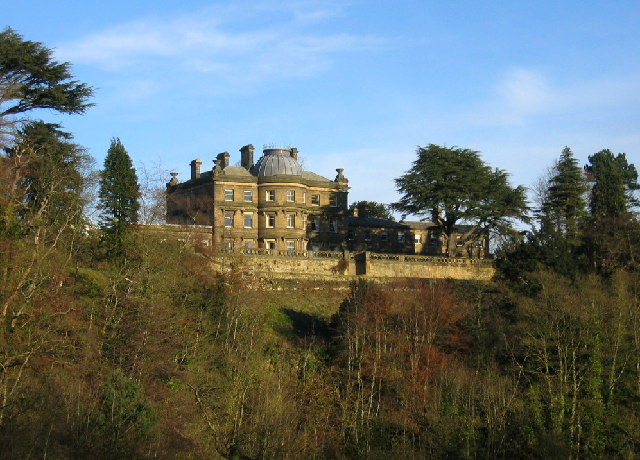
Hartford Hall near Bedlington today, consisting of apartments

A wealthy man, Burdon owned coalmines at Hartford, near Morpeth, where he lived for part of each year. Hartford Hall was built there for him around 1807 by William Stokoe. Alterations were later made to the house, about 1875.

Burdon died at his London house in Welbeck Street, Cavendish Square, on 30 May 1818. He was a patron of the writer Hewson Clarke.

== Works ==
Burdon wrote extensively on political and literary topics. His major works were:

- Examination of the Merits and Tendency of the Pursuits of Literature, 1799. Against Thomas James Mathias.
- A Vindication of Pope and Grattan from the Attacks of an anonymous Defamer, 1799.
- Various Thoughts on Politicks, Morality, and Literature, 1800. Based on letters published in the Cambridge Intelligencer.
- Materials for Thinking, 1803, 1812. A work of advocacy for liberalism, in a broad sense. The Lacon of Charles Caleb Colton was thought to draw on this work, as well as Bacon's Essays.
- The Life and Character of Buonaparte, 1804. Burdon had praised Napoleon in Various Thoughts, but this was a critical biography.
- Letters on the Affairs of Spain, 1809.
- Cobbett and the Reformers impartially examined, 1813, in which he proposed a moderate reform programme. In private Burdon wrote in more extreme terms, and was an atheist.

In 1795 Burdon wrote letters in the Cambridge Intelligencer against Richard Watson, Bishop of Llandaff, the absentee Cambridge Regius Professor of Divinity, claiming his deputy Thomas Kipling was incompetent. These were then published in book form by Benjamin Flower as Three Letters Addressed to the Bishop of Llandaff, later in the same year. In 1807 he wrote on reform in Flower's Political Review and Monthly Register.

Burdon wrote pamphlets on political questions of the day, and translated in 1810, from the Spanish of Álvaro Flórez Estrada, A Constitution for the Spanish Nation, and an Introduction to the History of the Revolution in Spain, besides circulating an Examination of the Dispute between Spain and her Colonies. He was the editor of the Memoirs of Józef Boruwłaski (1820).

== Family ==
Burdon married in 1798 Jane Dickson, a daughter of Lieutenant-general Dickson, coalmine owner; they had five children, one of which was William Burdon. She died in 1806. Their daughter Hannah Burdon (born 1800) achieved fame as a writer of novels.

== Notes ==
Attribution

This article incorporates text from a publication now in the public domain: Stephen, Leslie, ed. (1886). "Burdon, William". Dictionary of National Biography. Vol. 7. London: Smith, Elder & Co.
