= Francis Burden =

British chess player

- Born: 1829/30; Belfast, Ireland
- Died: 13 January 1882
- Occupations: Civil engineer, chess player

Francis Burden (1829/30 – 13 January 1882) was a British civil engineer and chess player. He was also skilled at whist and billiards. Hans Renette has suggested that Burden may have inspired Henry Bird to play what is now known as the Bird Defense in the Ruy Lopez.

== Biography ==
Burden was born in Belfast, Ireland in either 1829 or 1830, and lived in London for many years, where he met and trained Cecil Valentine De Vere in chess. He visited Venezuela in his capacity as a businessman around 1870, after which he developed a fever and was forced to retire from chess. He died on 13 January 1882, at the age of 52, on the same day that his close friend Samuel Boden died. At the time of his death, he had been retired from chess for twelve or thirteen years.
