= J. E. Cookson =

British academic historian studying Georgian-era Britain

John Ernest Cookson is an historian specialising in late eighteenth and early nineteenth century British history. He was Senior Lecturer in History at the University of Canterbury. He was appointed to Canterbury in 1968 and retired in January 2007.

== Works ==
- Lord Liverpool's Administration: The Crucial Years, 1815-1822 (Scottish Academic Press, 1975).
- The Friends of Peace: Anti-War Liberalism in England 1793-1815 (Cambridge University Press, 1982).
- The British Armed Nation, 1793-1815 (Clarendon Press, 1997).
