= William Burdon (MP) =

English Whig Member of Parliament

William Wharton Burdon (1803–1870) was an English Whig Member of Parliament who represented Weymouth and Melcombe Regis from 1835 to 1837.

He was the son of William Burdon, and matriculated at Emmanuel College, Cambridge in 1817. He resided at Hartford Hall, just outside Bedlington, a mansion built for his father by the architect William Stokoe.

Burdon did not marry, and his estate went to Augustus Edward de Butts, a second cousin, who took the surname Burdon.
