= Barry Burden =

American political scientist

Barry C. Burden
- Born: April 28, 1971 (age 54)
- Education: Wittenberg University (B.A., 1993); Ohio State University (Ph.D., 1998)
- Scientific career
- Fields: Political science
- Institutions: Louisiana State University (1998–1999); Harvard University (1999–2006); University of Wisconsin–Madison (2006–present)
- Thesis: Candidates' positions in congressional elections (1998)
- Doctoral advisor: Herbert F. Weisberg

Barry C. Burden (born April 28, 1971) is an American political scientist. He is Professor of Political Science at the University of Wisconsin–Madison, where he is also the Lyons Family Chair in Electoral Politics and director of the Elections Research Center. Before joining the faculty of the University of Wisconsin–Madison in 2006, he taught at Louisiana State University and Harvard University.
