= John Clayton (minister) =

English Independent minister

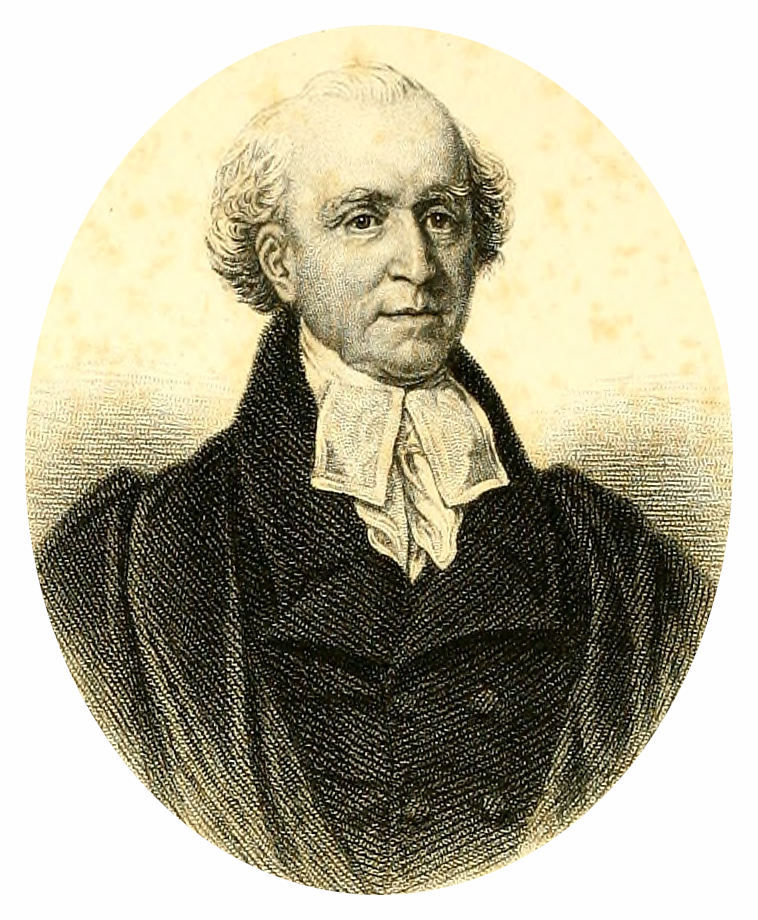
Rev. John Clayton

John Clayton (5 October 1754 – 23 September 1843) was an English Independent minister. He became known for his conservative social views, after the Priestley Riots.

== Early life ==
Clayton was born at Wood End Farm, Clayton, near Chorley, Lancashire, 5 October 1764, the only son of George Clayton, a bleacher; he had nine elder sisters. He was educated at Leyland grammar school, and was apprenticed to his brother-in-law, Boultbee, an apothecary in Manchester. At the end of four years he ran off, and made his way to the house of a married sister in London.

Clayton was taken to hear the Rev. William Romaine preach, and a religious conversion followed. Clayton was then introduced to the Countess of Huntingdon, and sent by her to Trevecca College. He became a popular preacher, and was sent to take charge of a chapel at Tunbridge Wells. He also preached frequently in London. In 1777 he sought episcopal ordination, but difficulties arose, and reading Michaijah Towgood's Letters on Dissent made him a nonconformist; the Countess rebuked him in a long letter.

== Nonconformist ==
Sir Harry Trelawny, 7th Baronet, minister of a Presbyterian congregation at West Looe in Cornwall, took Clayton on as assistant. Clayton's Calvinism soon led to a break, and he accepted an invitation to succeed the Rev. Samuel Wilton, D.D., as pastor of the Weigh-house Chapel in London; and he was ordained there 25 November 1778.

In 1793 Clayton was appointed one of the preachers at the merchants' lecture. He held similar posts at Fetter Lane, Holborn, and Hare Court, Aldersgate.

== Last years ==
About 1820 Clayton bought a small estate at Gaines in Essex, and in 1826 he resigned the charge of the Weigh-house, after a pastorate of 48 years. His wife died 11 January 1836, and he died 22 September 1843. He is buried in Bunhill Fields.

== Family ==
Clayton married, in July 1779, Mary, the eldest daughter of George Flower and his wife Martha Fuller and the sister of both Benjamin Flower and Richard Flower. Three of his sons afterwards attained distinction in the congregational ministry, John Clayton junior, George Clayton, and William Clayton.

His brother-in-law Benjamin Flower brought an action against John Clayton, junior, who had circulated statements made by his father imputing to Flower forgery, or its equivalent. The case was tried before Lord Mansfield 25 July 1808, and the verdict of the jury awarded 40 shillings damages, just enough to carry costs.

John Clayton, junior was pastor of the Poultry Chapel, London, for thirty years. He died at Bath, Somerset 3 October 1865, aged 85. He published sermons and a treatise on The Choice of Books, 1811.

== Works ==
Clayton published:

- The Snares of Prosperity, with an Essay upon Visiting, London, 1789.
- The Duty of Christians to Magistrates, London, 1791, a sermon which led to a controversy, and provoked Robert Hall's Christianity consistent with a Love of Freedom. The context was the Birmingham Riots of 1791, and Clayton was generally criticised by dissenters for neglecting civil rights.
- The great Mercies of the Lord bestowed upon Britain, London, 1802.
- The Antidote of Fear; a Sermon, London, 1804.
- A Counter Statement relative to a late Withdrawment from a Dissenting Independent Church, London, 1804. This referred to one of his flock who had a taste for the theatre, and sometimes travelled on Sunday. The Rev. Richard Cecil is reported to have said: "Clayton, I have long respected you, but I have never before envied you. I own I do now envy you, because I hear that you have applied the discipline of the church to a man that rides in his coach."

== Recognition ==
The Clayton Congregational Church, now Clayton Wesley Uniting Church, a prominent building in prosperous Beulah Park, South Australia, was named for him.

== Notes ==
Attribution

This article incorporates text from a publication now in the public domain: Stephen, Leslie, ed. (1887). "Clayton, John (1754-1843)". Dictionary of National Biography. Vol. 11. London: Smith, Elder & Co.
