= Gilbert Wakefield =

English scholar (1756–1801)

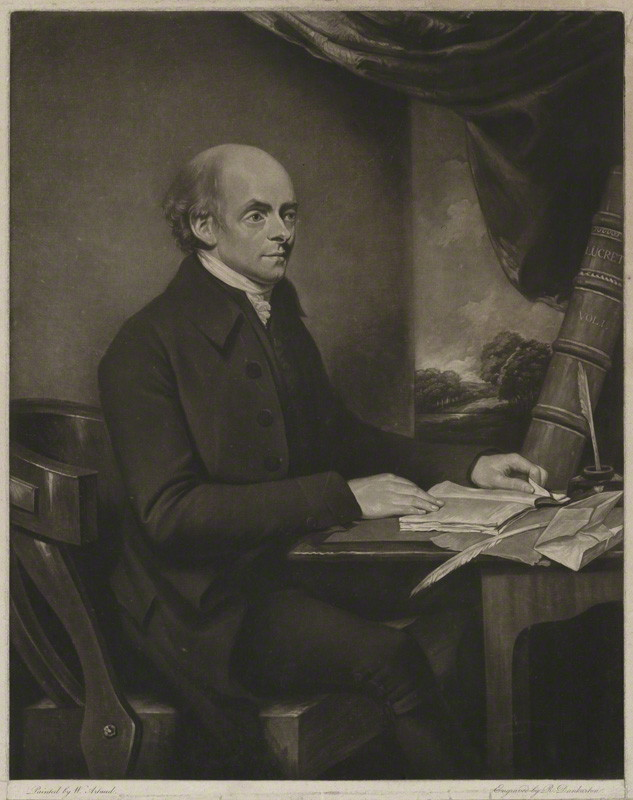
Gilbert Wakefield

Gilbert Wakefield (1756–1801) was an English scholar and controversialist. He moved from being a cleric and academic, into tutoring at dissenting academies, and finally became a professional writer and publicist. In a celebrated state trial, he was imprisoned for a pamphlet critical of government policy of the French Revolutionary Wars; and died shortly after his release.

== Early life and background ==
He was born 22 February 1756 in Nottingham, the third son of the Rev. George Wakefield, then rector of St Nicholas' Church, Nottingham but afterwards at Kingston-upon-Thames, and his wife Elizabeth. He was one of five brothers, who included George, a merchant in Manchester.

His father was from Rolleston, Staffordshire, and came to Cambridge in 1739 as a sizar. He had support in his education from the Hardinge family, of Melbourne, Derbyshire, his patrons being Nicholas Hardinge and his physician brother. In his early career he was chaplain to Margaret Newton, in her own right 2nd Countess Coningsby. George Hardinge, son of Nicholas, after Gilbert's death pointed out that the living of Kingston passed to George Wakefield in 1769, under an Act of Parliament specifying presentations to chapels of the parish, only because he had used his personal influence with his uncle Charles Pratt, 1st Baron Camden the Lord Chancellor, and Jeremiah Dyson.

== Education and Fellowship ==
Wakefield had some schooling in the Nottingham area, under Samuel Berdmore and then at Wilford under Isaac Pickthall. He then made good progress at Kingston Free School under Richard Wooddeson the elder (died 1774), father of Richard Wooddeson the jurist.

Wakefield was sent to university young, because Wooddeson was retiring from teaching. An offer came of a place at Christ Church, Oxford, from the Rev. John Jeffreys (1718–1798); but his father turned it down. He went to Jesus College, Cambridge on a scholarship founded by Robert Marsden: the Master Lynford Caryl was from Nottinghamshire, and a friend of his father. He matriculated in 1772, and graduated B.A. as second wrangler in 1776. He was a Fellow of the college from 1776 to 1779, and was ordained deacon in the Church of England in 1778.

Wakefield associated with John Jebb and Robert Tyrwhitt. William Bennet, senior tutor of Emmanuel College, became a long-term friend from this time, as Wakefield put it in 1799, "amidst all the differences of opinion".

The Rev. George Wakefield died in 1776, aged 56. The situation of Gilbert's younger brother Thomas, then still an undergraduate at Jesus College but also ordained priest and a curate to his father at Kingston, was anomalous, at least in the view of George Hardinge. His younger brother Henry Hardinge, at this point signed up at Peterhouse but yet to matriculate, became vicar of Kingston in 1778. Thomas Wakefield was at St Mary Magdalene, Richmond for the rest of his life, dying in 1806; and Gilbert was buried there. In the first edition of his autobiography, Gilbert was critical of Hardinge's legal moves to dislodge Thomas from this Richmond chapel, to which the presentation had been with his father (under Act of Parliament). The matter ended up in the Court of Common Pleas, which ruled for Thomas Wakefield. The 1802 edition tacitly omitted slurs to which Hardinge objected. Hardinge blamed an unnamed malevolent person, and his parting shot was that Thomas as a boy "had been intended for trade".

== Curacies ==
In 1778, Wakefield was a curate at St Mary's Church, Stockport, under the Rev. John Watson, an antiquarian. He was interested in becoming head of Brewood School, but baulked at again signing up to the 39 Articles.

Wakefield then was a curate in Liverpool. There he preached on abolitionism, and against privateering, which was badly received at this time in the Anglo-French War (1778–1783). He commented in his autobiography that Liverpool was the "headquarters" of the Atlantic slave trade, that the American Revolutionary War with the French war impeded slaving, and the upsurge with privateering, which he saw as aggravating war, was a consequence.

From 1778, Wakefield began to question the scriptural foundation of the orthodox teaching of the Church of England; and he expressed political views by modifying the language in prayers he read in Liverpool against the American revolutionaries. He married in 1779, bringing his fellowship to an end.

== Dissenting tutor ==
Wakefield left the ministry, and in mid-1779 became classical tutor at Warrington Academy, recommended by Jebb. The Academy closed in 1783, in Wakefield's view from financial troubles. He commented also that at least a third of the students during his time there were from Church of England families, rather than being from a dissenting background.

Wakefield's theology had become a nonconforming Unitarianism. John Hunt in his Religious Thought in England classed him with Edward Evanson, among prominent Unitarians leaving the Church of England, and as having in common that "they can scarcely be regarded as representing anybody but themselves". He had attracted the attention of Theophilus Lindsey; who made qualifications of his approval of someone he considered a "true scholar". In 1783 Lindsey explained to William Turner his reasons for not supporting Wakefield as a replacement for the ailing William Leechman at Glasgow. Wakefield at Warrington still attended services of the Church of England; and he hoped "time will mellow his dispositions, and lessen the high opinion he has of himself".

Robert Malthus, a pupil of Wakefield at the Academy, continued with him for a year after the Warrington closure. Residing at Bramcote outside Nottingham, and then in Richmond, Surrey where his brother Thomas was at St Mary Magdalene's chapel, Wakefield found no more students. At the chapel, on the day in 1784 appointed for a thanksgiving for the end of the American war, he preached an anti-colonial sermon. It was quoted by Thomas Clarkson in his history of abolitionism, together with accounts of two contemporary works, the Essays, Historical and Moral of George Gregory, and the Essay on the Treatment and Conversion of the African Slaves in the British Sugar Colonies by James Ramsay.

Wakefield lived in Nottingham from 1784 to 1790. Here he was able to find private pupils. One was Robert Hibbert, from a slave-holding family in Jamaica, who went on to Cambridge. He was a Unitarian, on good terms with William Frend, and founded the Hibbert Trust. He was also at odds with his cousin George Hibbert. George Hibbert was Wakefield's patron, whom Wakefield thanked in his autobiography; but it was Robert who gave financial support when he was imprisoned.

In 1790, Wakefield was appointed to the New College, Hackney, where Thomas Belsham had been recruited the year before, and Joseph Priestley arrived the year after. It was a contentious trio of hirings. Wakefield's application was strengthened by a character reference from George Walker, minister at the High Pavement Chapel in Nottingham and a friend.

Among Wakefield's pupils at Hackney was John Jones. His time at the New College was short: he left in 1791, on the grounds of disillusion with public worship. The subsequent controversy showed Wakefield in "one of the most extreme positions" maintained in Rational Dissent.

== Writer and pamphleteer ==
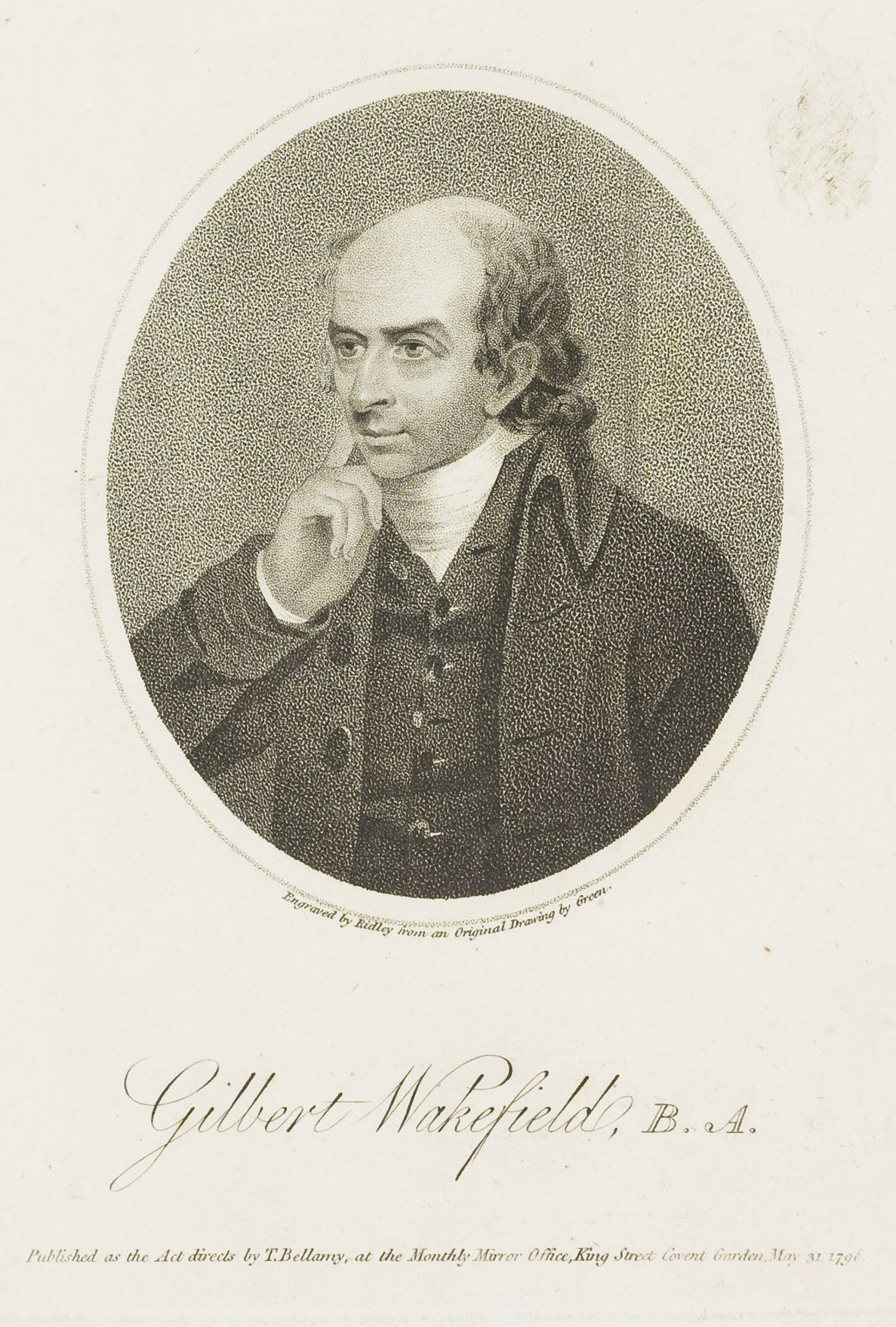
Wakefield (1798)

Wakefield from then on lived by his pen, and was a prolific author. He was a passionate defender of the French Revolution. The final issue, in 1798, of the Anti-Jacobin contained a satirical poem "New Morality", calling on opposition newspapers, poets and radicals including John Thelwall, Priestley and Wakefield to "praise Lepaux", i.e. Louis Marie de La Révellière-Lépeaux, a leader of the French Directory.

William Burdon replied to a remark of Thomas James Mathias:

Whenever I think of the name of Gilbert Wakefield, and look at the list of his works, (for I would not undertake to read them all), I feel alternate sorrow and indignation.

Burdon wrote:

To the name and character of Gilbert Wakefield, I am desirous to shew every possible respect, as a zealous, though sometimes an imprudent defender of the rights of human nature.

In 1794, Wakefield expressed admiration for the Manchester radical Thomas Walker. Acquainted socially, they were both guests at a London radical dinner given on 3 January 1795 by Thomas Northmore, others there being John Disney, William Godwin, Thomas Brand Hollis and "Bard" Iolo Morganwg.

Of the 1798 quickly-written wartime squib that provoked a prosecution of Wakefield, Marilyn Butler wrote:

Very lively and very impertinent, Wakefield's pamphlet exemplified both the ability of radical writers to make a point, and their alienation from the temper of the mass of the British people in a national crisis.

=== Pamphlets of the 1790s ===
- An Enquiry into the Expediency and Propriety of Public or Social Worship (1791). There were replies from Joseph Priestley, Anna Barbauld, Eusebia (Mary Hays); John Disney, James Wilson (M.A. Glasgow) of Stockport; John Bruckner; Thomas Jervis and others. Wakefield answered Priestley.
- Evidences of Christianity 1793
- The Spirit of Christianity, Compared with the Spirit of the Times in Great Britain (1794). There was an anonymous reply Vindiciae Britannicae in the Revolution Controversy, arguing in defence of the status quo in the British constitution, by "An Under Graduate" (identified as William Penn (1776–1845), son of Richard Penn, matriculated at St John's College, Cambridge 1795.).
- Remarks on the General Orders of the Duke of York to his Army on June 7, 1794 (1794)
- An Examination of The Age of Reason: or an investigation of true and fabulous theology by Thomas Paine (1794)
- A Reply to the Letter of Edmund Burke, Esq. to a Noble Lord (1796)
- A Letter to William Wilberforce, Esq. on the Subject of His Late Publication (1797). Reply from the point of view of rational dissent to William Wilberforce's A Practical View of the Prevailing Religious System of Professed Christians, in the Middle and Higher Classes in this Country, Contrasted with Real Christianity (1797). There were related replies from Thomas Belsham and Joshua Toulmin. The nonconformist John Watkins wrote in support of Wilberforce, as did the Anglican Rev. George Hutton in 1798.
- A letter to Sir J. Scott, his Majesty's Attorney-General, on the subject of a late Trial at Guildhall (1798). Addressed to Sir John Scott. On the trial of the radical booksellers Joseph Johnson and J. S. Jordan for seditious libel, and liberty of the press according to commentary in the Analytical Review.
- The Defence of Gilbert Wakefield, B.A. (1799)

== Imprisonment and death ==
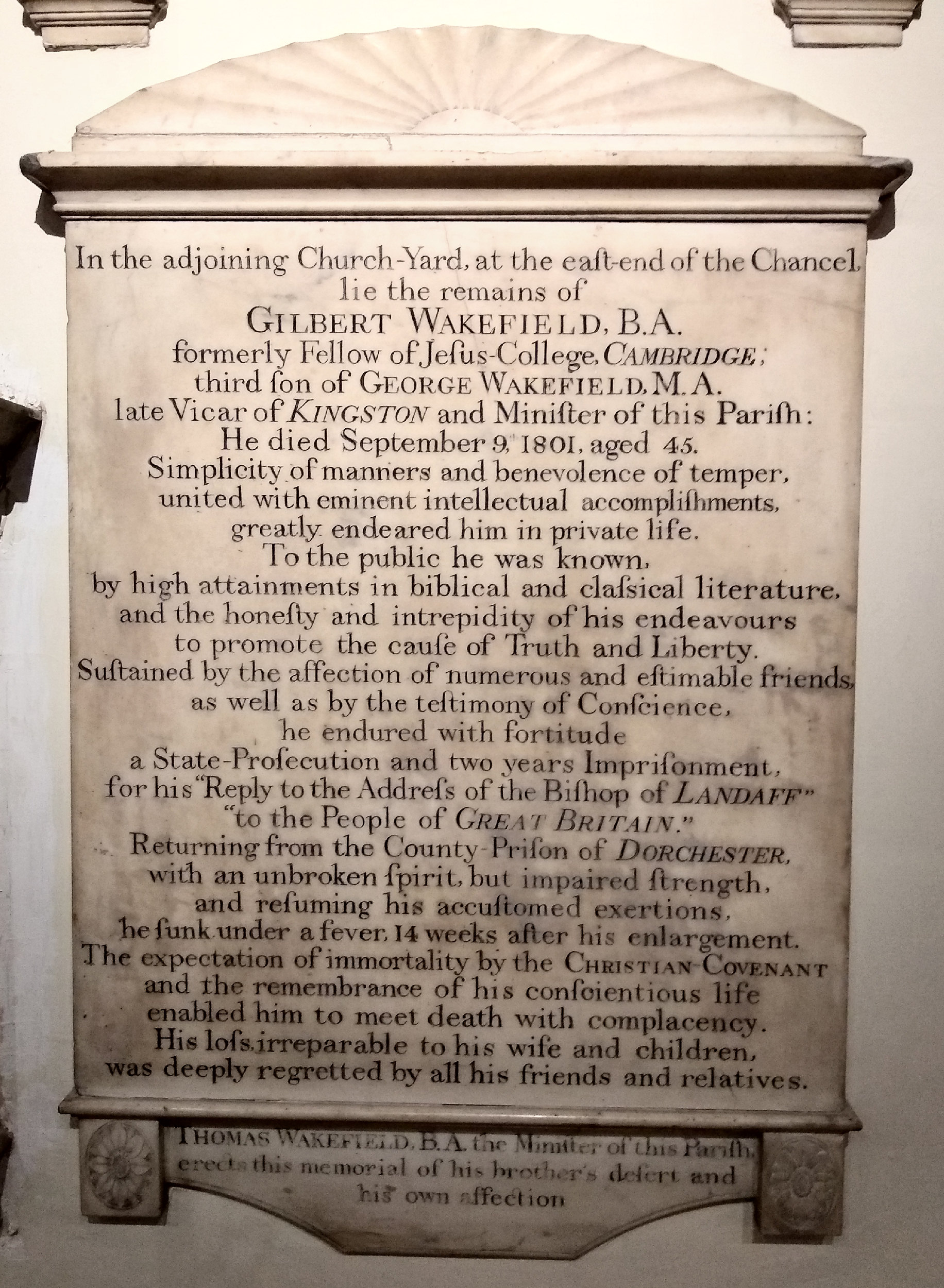
Memorial in St Mary Magdalene, Richmond to Gilbert Wakefield, placed there by the Rev. Thomas Wakefield, parish priest there and his brother

The controversial pamphlet A Reply to some Parts of the Bishop of Landaff's Address (1798) saw both Wakefield and his publisher, Joseph Johnson, taken to court for seditious libel. A work alluding to the concentration of poverty in the area centred on Hackney, it was written in response to An Address to the People of Great Britain (1798), by Richard Watson, Bishop of Llandaff. Watson argued that national taxes should be raised to pay for the war against France and to reduce the national debt.

For selling the Reply, Johnson was fined £50 and sentenced to six months imprisonment in King's Bench Prison in February 1799. Later in the year, Wakefield appeared before Lord Kenyon in the Court of King's Bench, conducting his own defence, with Sir John Scott. His trial followed on directly after that of the bookseller John Cuthell, with the same jury. Much of the prosecution case was read from the Reply. Wakefield made a systemic and personalised attack on the lack of justice in the court and process. He had checked the pamphlet for libellous content with a barrister. The judge summed up in support of Scott, and the jury returned a guilty verdict without retiring.

Wakefield was imprisoned in Dorchester gaol for two years for seditious libel. Among his visitors there was Robert Southey in 1801. He was released from prison on 29 May 1801, and died in Hackney on 9 September 1801, a victim of typhus fever. His library was put up for auction by Leigh, Sotherby & Co. in March 1802.

== Scholarship ==
A new translation of those parts only of the New Testament, which are wrongly translated in our common version (1789) was followed in 1791 by Wakefield's Translation of the New Testament, with Notes, in three volumes. In his memoirs Wakefield records that the work was laborious, particularly in the comparison of the Oriental versions with the Received Text; but was "much more profitable to me than all my other publications put together". A revised edition followed in 1795.

Wakefield also published editions of various classical writers, and among his theological writings are Early Christian Writers on the Person of Christ (1784), Silva Critica (1789–95), and illustrations of the Scriptures.

== Memoirs and letters ==
- Autobiography: Memoirs of the life of Gilbert Wakefield 1792 - 405 pages
- Correspondence:, ed. Charles James Fox Correspondence of the late Gilbert Wakefield, B. A. 1813

== Family ==
Wakefield married in 1779 Anne Watson (died 1819), niece of the incumbent John Watson at Stockport St Mary where he had been a curate. They had five sons and two daughters.

- George (born c.1780), the eldest son, married in 1816 Anne Bowness, daughter of the Rev. William Bowness. He worked as an ordnance storekeeper in Kingston, Upper Canada, and died in 1837 at Barnstaple, aged 57.
- Gilbert (baptised 1790 in Nottingham)
- Henry (1793–1861), third son, married in 1817 Harriet Pomeroy, daughter of Thomas Pomeroy. He was a surgeon, beginning as a pupil in Knutsford of Peter Holland, father of Sir Henry Holland. He was on the continent after Waterloo, where his brother George was serving. He was surgeon to the county prisons from 1830.
- Robert, youngest surviving son, died in 1866 at age 70.
- Alfred, who died while his father was in prison.
- Anne (died 1821) married Charles Rochemont Aikin, and was mother of Anna Letitia Le Breton.
- Elizabeth (died 1811), younger daughter, married in 1809 Francis Wakefield the younger.

Their daughter Anne, in poor health, went to stay with Peter Crompton and his wife at Eton House, on the edge of Liverpool, shortly before Gilbert was imprisoned. George, the eldest son, went to Dorchester Grammar school, under Henry John Richman who was on good terms with Wakefield. At this time William Shepherd took care of his younger brother Gilbert. One of the daughters, to whom Wakefield's gaoler's son had been paying unwelcome attentions, went to stay with William Roscoe.

== See also ==
- Hardy progeny of the North
