= George Dyer (poet) =

English classicist, poet and editor

George Dyer (1755–1841) was an English classicist, poet and editor. He was born at Wapping in London 15 March 1755, the son of a watchman.

== Life ==
He was educated at Christ's Hospital from the ages of 7 to 19. While there, Anthony Askew lent him books and encouraged his studies of Greek. He then attended Emmanuel College, Cambridge. There he came to the attention of Richard Farmer and graduated in 1778.

His first job was as an usher, or assistant teacher, at a school in Dedham. He then went to work as a tutor to the children of clergyman Robert Robinson at Chesterton. After Robinson’s death in 1790, Dyer returned to teaching and joined the staff of a school in Northampton in 1791. A failed love affair prompted another move, this time to the capital.

He settled in London in 1792 where he tried various occupations. He was, briefly, a reporter in the House of Commons. Then a private tutor. He then became a freelance researcher, writer and editor to various literary publishers and booksellers. He also wrote poetry and was a regular contributor to literary magazines.

He edited the Delphin Classics, a 143-volume set of Latin works published by Abraham John Valpy at which task his editorial labors were so excessive as to induce near total blindness. He also wrote poetry, and authored a number of tracts on the plight of England's poor and on reform of the political system.

== Radical ==
He shared many ideas with radical writers of the time. His doctrine of benevolence advised a moral obligation to the poor, during a time when the interest in the lower classes was subsiding. He influenced authors such as William Godwin, but also gave critical and moral support to Samuel Taylor Coleridge and William Wordsworth.

Nicholas Roe's chapter on Dyer in The Politics of Nature: Wordsworth and Some Contemporaries shows Dyer to have been an important model for Wordsworth and Coleridge in the way he brought politics to bear on the poetry of nature and imagination. Dyer's influence represents, for Roe, the answer to current historians who believe that the Romantics turned their backs on history in their search for a transcendent nature. The poet thus seems to have revenged himself on claims of insignificance.

Dyer was well regarded by his friends and associates, for his dedication to scholarship and loveable and eccentric personality. Contemporary accounts abound in references to his quirks and myopia.

== Personality ==
There are a number of stories associated with Dyer, particularly regarding his myopia and his eccentricities. These stories were told by his friends Leigh Hunt and Charles Lamb. Lamb in his Elia essay "Amicus Redivivus" relates an incident in which Dyer, after a visit to the Lamb household in Islington, walked the wrong way on the pathway and went right into the New River, nearly drowning himself in the process. Leigh Hunt tells a similar story regarding Dyer, in which after spending the evening at the Hunts' for dinner, he inadvertently left with only one shoe. Apparently Dyer's missing shoe went unnoticed by him until he arrived home and he returned to the Hunt household after midnight, awakening everyone, to retrieve his missing shoe which was finally located under a table.

In his rooms, Dyer had a disreputable armchair with a number of holes in the upholstery. Two of his female friends, trying to do him a favour, sewed up the gaping holes. To their dismay, they later discovered Dyer kept a book in each hole.

Another incident relating to Dyer concerns a preface which he wrote for his Poems published in 1802. On rereading one of the first prints of his book, Dyer claimed that there was a significant error in reasoning contained on the first page of the preface. He rushed to the printer and had a number of prints redone at considerable expense.

In about 1825, he married the widow of a solicitor, a Mrs Mather.

He died in his rooms at Clifford’s Inn on 2 March 1841.

== Assessment ==
According to Leigh Hunt, he was,

… a good-hearted, careless fellow … a sort of better-bred Dominie Sampson - a Goldsmith, with the genius taken out of him, but the goodness left - an angel of the dusty heaven of bookstalls and the British Museum.

William Hazlitt thought Dyer was one of “God Almighty’s gentleman”.

== Works ==
Compositions by George Dyer include:

- Poems (London, 1792)
- Complaints of the Poor People of England (London 1793)
- Poems and Critical Essays (London, 1802)
- History of the University and Colleges of Cambridge (two volumes, London, 1814)
- Privileges of the University of Cambridge (London, 1824)
