= The Pedlar's Pack =

Fairy tale by Mary De Morgan

- Short story by Mary De Morgan
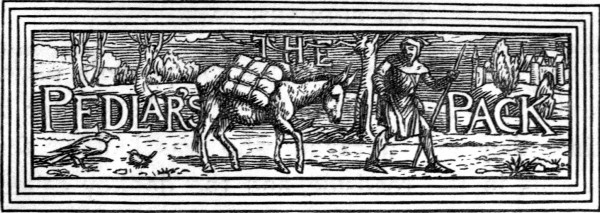
- Illustrator: Walter Crane
- Country: England
- Language: English
- Genre: Literary fairy tale

Publication
- Published in: The Necklace Of Princess Firmonde
- Publisher: Macmillan & Co.
- Publication date: 1886

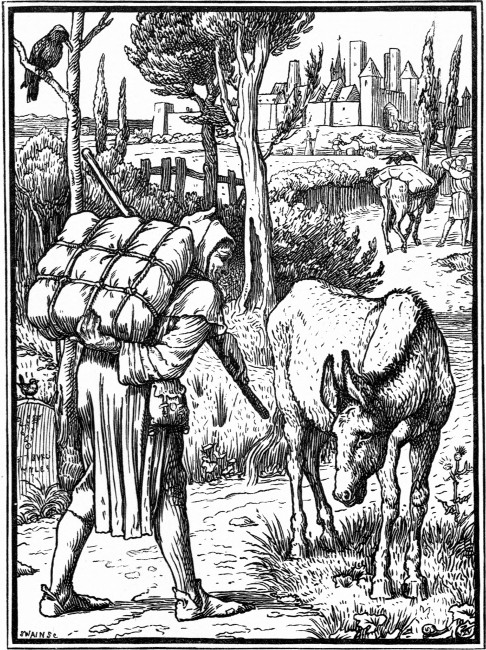
"The Pedlar's Pack" – Illustration by Walter Crane

Published in 1886, "The Pedlar's Pack" is a fairy tale written by Mary De Morgan (1850–1907). The protagonist is a traveller and salesman who meets three animals on his journey to a nearby town; the story concludes with the four travellers bitterly vowing to never trust one another again.

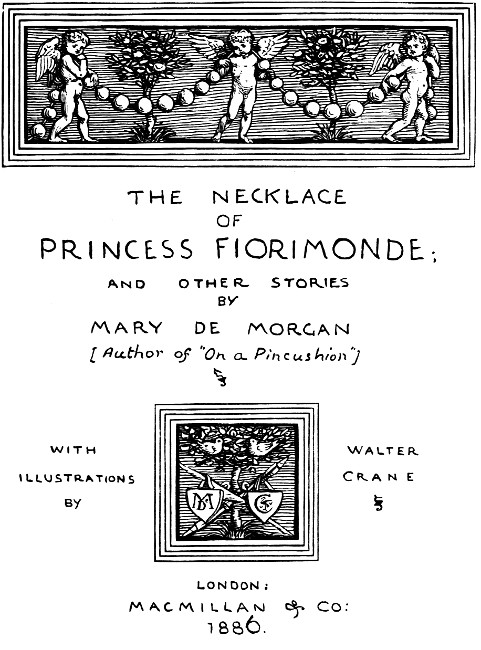
The Necklace Of Princess Firmonde; And Other Stories by Mary De Morgan

== Plot summary ==
The story begins with a lone pedlar walking along a road carrying his pack on his back. The pedlar meets a donkey and asks him if he might carry the heavy pack for two gold pieces. The pedlar lies and says he has the gold pieces and the pedlar and donkey carry on down the dusty road. Further up the road the two travellers meet a raven; the donkey asks him to chase away the flies swarming around him. The donkey deceives the raven by telling him that he can pay three gold pieces for the job; the raven concurs with the price and the three continue their journey. In time they meet a hedge-sparrow; the raven tells the hedge-sparrow that if he fetches the hungry raven worms, in return the raven will pay him four pieces of gold. However, the raven is lying as he does not have the money. The hedge-sparrow agrees to the contingencies and all four make their way down the road; the donkey with the pedlar’s pack, the raven sitting on the donkey’s back to shoo away the flies, and the hedge-sparrow, supplying the raven with worms.

Finally, the four travellers see a town in the distance, and the pedlar begins to prepare his goods for potential customers. The hedge-sparrow finds a scarlet blanket in the pedlar’s wares that he wishes to purchase. The blanket costs five gold pieces; the hedge-sparrow haggles the price of the blanket down to four gold pieces: The four gold pieces the raven owes him. Soon the travellers all attempt to collect the money that they are owed, so that each of them can pay back their debts. They begin to quarrel as the human, the donkey, and the birds realize the money each of them owe does not exist and therefore will not be paid back.

Eventually the beadle from the nearby town hears the ruckus and decides to take the four travellers before the mayor of the town for judgement. The mayor condemns the pedlar to imprisonment, the donkey to be thrashed, and the tail-feathers of the raven and hedge-sparrow be pulled out. As each of the four travellers receive their punishments they vow to never trust, or be deceived, by each other again.

== Publication ==
The short story was first published in The Necklace Of Princess Firmonde by Macmillan & Co. in 1886, in London, UK. Later it was published again by Victor Gollancz Ltd in 1963, with an introduction by Roger Lancelyn Green.

== Author ==
Mary De Morgan (1850–1907) was a writer who lived in London, England. The youngest daughter of the mathematician Augustus De Morgan, she was born on 7 Camden Street, London, on February 24, 1850. She is the author of three volumes of fairytales: On A Pincushion (1877), The Necklace of Princess Florimonde (1880), and The Windfaries (1900). "The Pedlar's Pack" was published in the second volume of De Morgan’s fairytale trilogy. Hans Christian Andersen was one of her main influences, which made her fairytales slightly different from the norm at the time. In her fairy tales, the protagonist often does not gain any type of power, physically or financially, and they are often without a classic happy ending.

De Morgan was also a member of a women’s suffragist group called the Women's Franchise League. Often in her fairytales there is a strong female protagonist, frequently depicted saving and outwitting men. Another theme that tends to emerge in De Morgan's stories is the tendency for wealth and power to be described as negative attributes. This theme reveals itself in "The Pedlar’s Pack." She was once quoted in Roger Lancelyn Green’s introduction to her work: "I am so thankful I have only a small income – it is so delightful planning things and deciding what one can afford. It would bore me to death to be rich!".

De Morgan later moved to Cairo, Egypt, in attempt to improve her phthisis condition. Mary De Morgan died from her illness in 1907.

== Character list ==
- The Pedlar
- The Donkey
- The Raven
- The Hedge-sparrow
- The Beadle
- The Mayor

== See also ==
- The Heart of Princess Joan
- The Wise Princess

== Works cited ==
- De Morgan, Mary. "The Pedlar's Pack." The Necklace of Princess Fiormonde and Other Stories. London: Macmillan & Co, 1886. The Project Gutenberg. Web. 11 Feb 2013.
- "Mary De Morgan." Wikipedia, The Free Encyclopedia. Wikimedia Foundation, Inc., 2004. Web. 11 Feb 2013.
