= William De Morgan =

English potter, tile designer and novelist

William Frend De Morgan
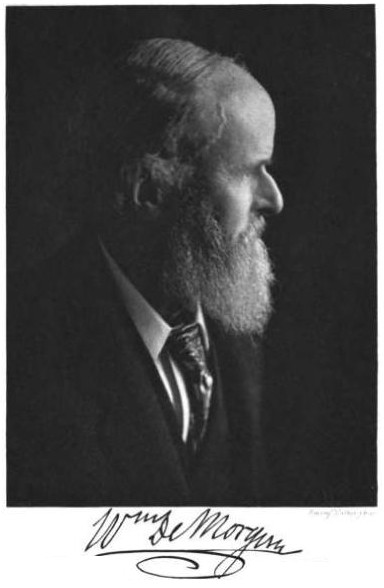
- William De Morgan
- Born: William Frend De Morgan; 16 November 1839; Gower Street, London
- Died: 15 January 1917 (aged 77); London
- Resting place: Brookwood Cemetery
- Education: University College School; Royal Academy Schools
- Known for: Ceramics
- Movement: Arts and Crafts
- Spouse: Evelyn Pickering
- Parents: Augustus De Morgan (father); Sophia Elizabeth Frend (mother)
- Relatives: William Frend (maternal grandfather); Mary De Morgan (sister)

William Frend De Morgan (16 November 1839 – 15 January 1917) was an English potter, tile designer and novelist. A lifelong friend of William Morris, he designed tiles, stained glass and furniture for Morris & Co. from 1863 to 1872. His tiles often recall medieval or Islamic design patterns. He applied innovative glazes and firing techniques. Galleons and fish were common motifs, as were "fantastical" birds and animals. Many of De Morgan's tiles were designed to create intricate patterns when several were laid together.

== Life and work ==
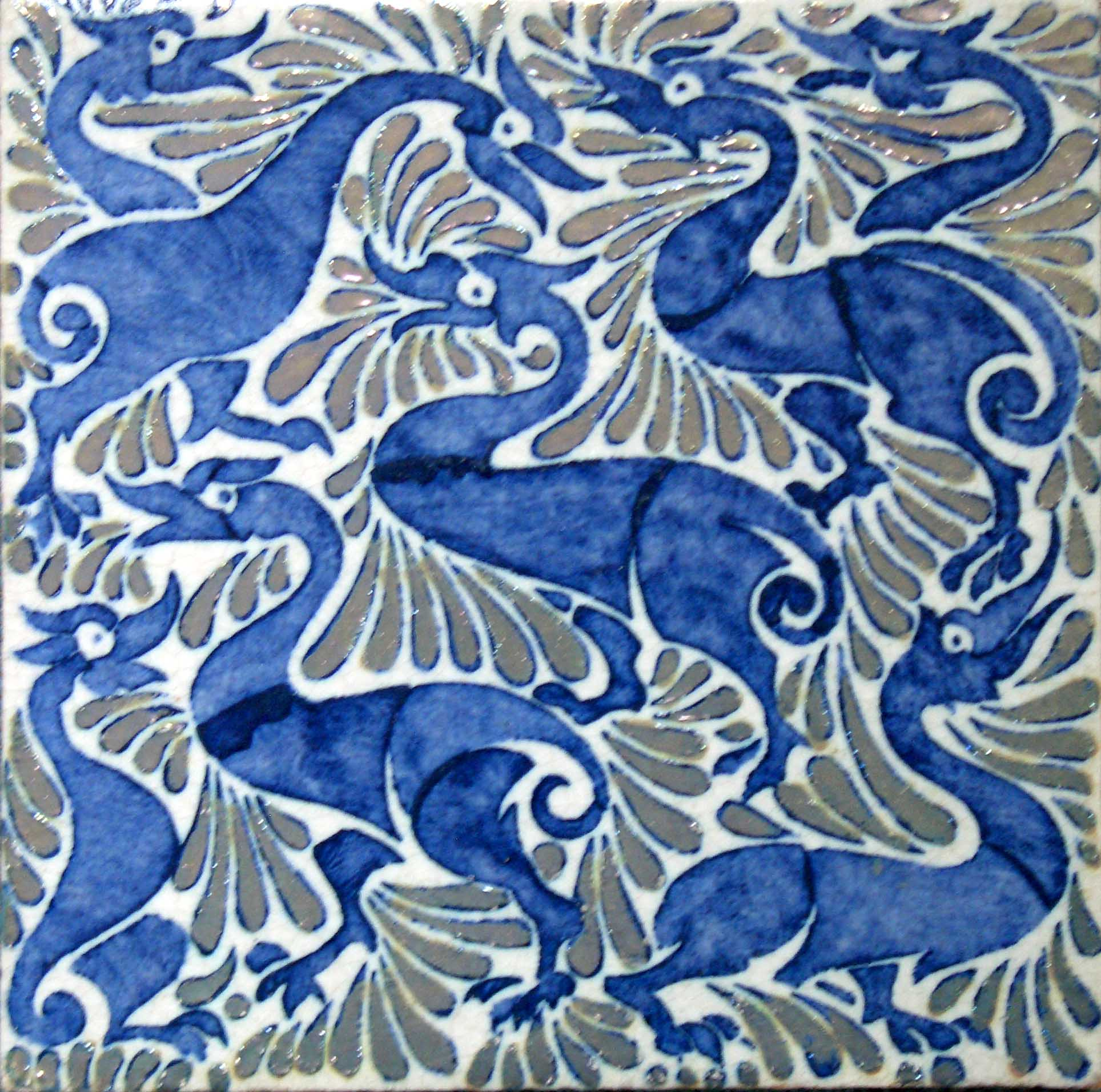
Fantastic ducks on 6-inch tile with lustre highlights, Fulham period

Born in Gower Street, London, De Morgan was the son of the distinguished mathematician Augustus De Morgan and the highly educated writer and social reformer Sophia Elizabeth Frend. He was named William Frend De Morgan after his maternal grandfather, the clergyman, mathematician and social reformer William Frend (1757–1841).

De Morgan grew up in an intellectually liberal household. His father was the first Professor of Mathematics at University College London, while his mother, Sophia Elizabeth Frend, was involved in social reform and women's education. Her activities included work connected with Bedford College, prison and workhouse reform, abolitionism and women's suffrage.

The Victoria and Albert Museum describes De Morgan as having grown up in a liberal household in which his artistic abilities were encouraged by his parents. His maternal grandfather William Frend had been a prominent religious dissenter and political and social reformer, and the Frend name was retained in William Frend De Morgan's own name.

Supported in his desire to become an artist, at the age of twenty De Morgan entered the Royal Academy Schools, but he was swiftly disillusioned with the establishment. Then he met Morris and through him the Pre-Raphaelite circle. Soon De Morgan began experimenting with stained glass, ventured into pottery in 1863, and by 1872 had shifted his interest wholly to ceramics, initially working in Fitzroy Square.

In 1872, De Morgan set up a pottery in Chelsea, where he stayed until 1881—his most fruitful decade as an art potter. The arts and crafts ideology he was exposed to through his friendship with Morris and his insistent curiosity led De Morgan to begin to explore every technical aspect of his craft. His early efforts at making his own tiles during his Chelsea Period were of variable technical quality—often amateurish with firing defects and irregularities. In his early years, De Morgan made extensive use of blank commercial tiles. Hard and durable biscuit tiles of red clay were obtained from the Patent Architectural Pottery Co. in Poole. Dust pressed tiles of white earthenware were bought from Wedgwood, Mintons and other manufacturers but De Morgan believed these would not stand frost. He continued to use blank commercial dust-pressed tiles which were decorated in red lustre into his Fulham Period (1888–1907). However, he developed a high-quality biscuit tile of his own, which he admired for its irregularities and better resistance to moisture. His inventive streak led him to spend hours designing a duplex bicycle gear and lured him into complex studies of the chemistry of glazes, methods of firing, and pattern transfer.

Between 1882 and 1900, De Morgan was commissioned by T. E. Collcutt to produce tile panels for the public rooms of 12 P&O liners. This followed an earlier commission in 1880, to produce similar panels for the Tsar's yacht, Livadia.

De Morgan's decoration of pottery included chargers, rice dishes and vases. Some of these were made in his works, but many were bought as biscuit ware from Wedgwood and others and decorated by De Morgan's workers. Some were signed by his decorators including Charles Passenger, Fred Passenger, Joe Juster and Miss Babb.

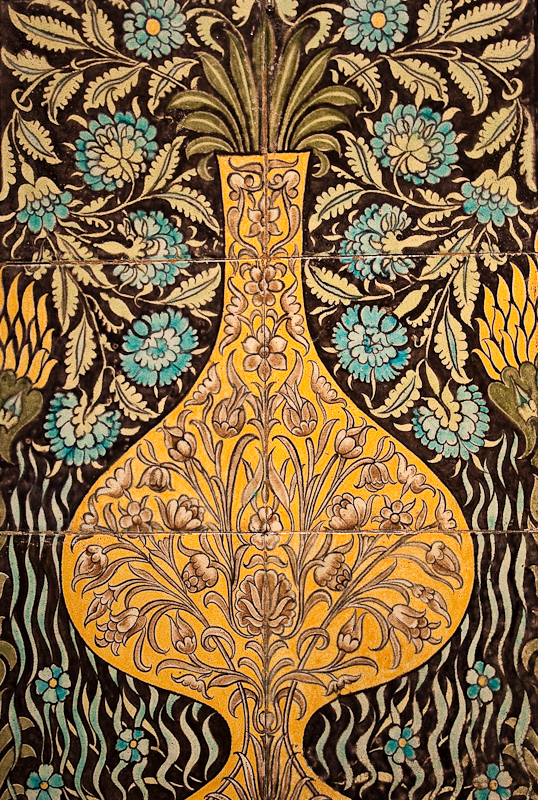
William De Morgan (c. 1890), Sands Ends Pottery: tiles inspired by Middle East examples

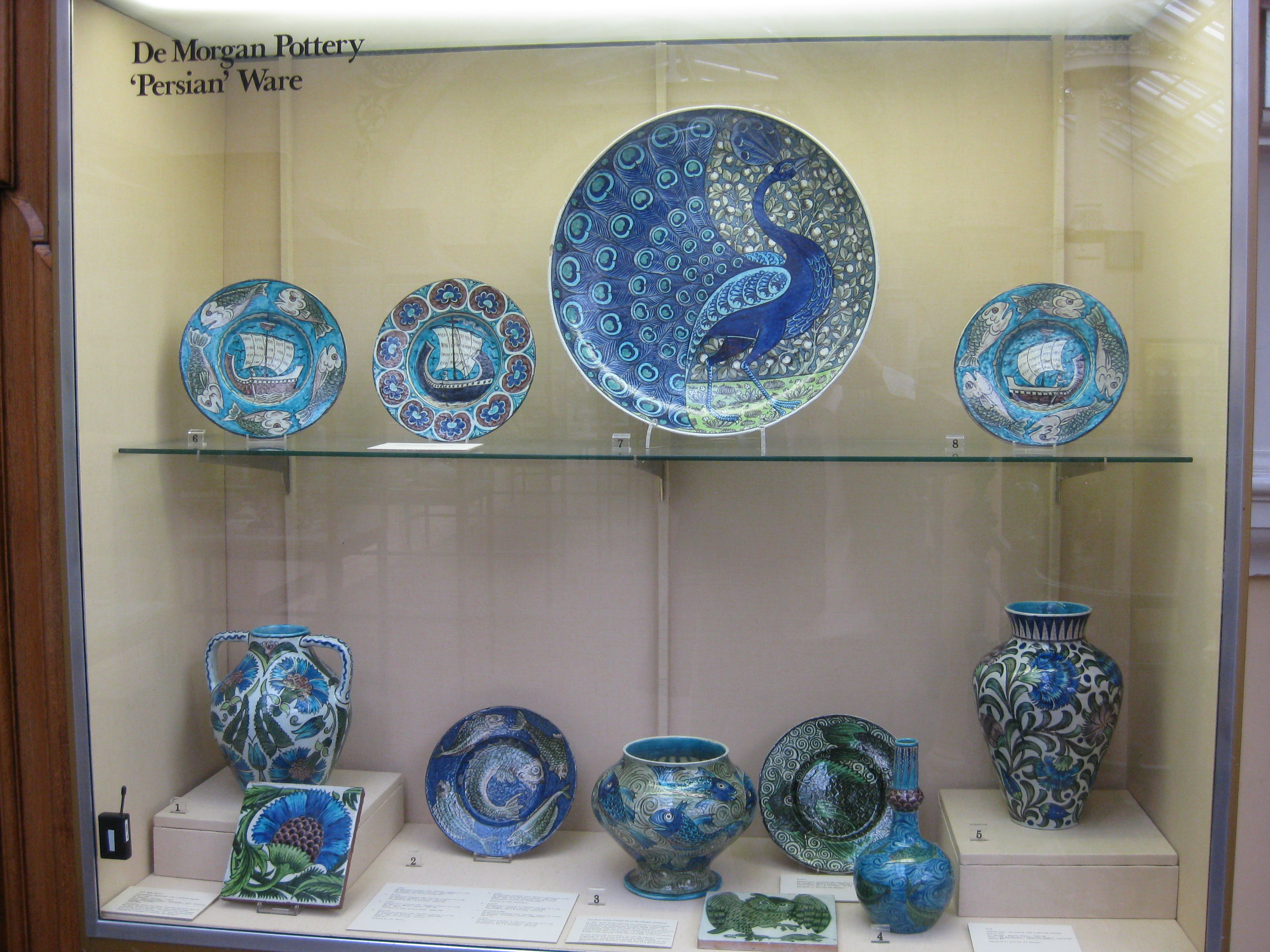
Persian ware display at the Birmingham Museum and Art Gallery

De Morgan was particularly drawn to Eastern tiles. Around 1873–1874, he made a striking breakthrough by rediscovering the technique of lustreware (marked by a reflective, metallic surface) found in Hispano-Moresque pottery and Italian maiolica. Nor was his interest in the East limited to glazing techniques, but it permeated his notions of design and colour as well. As early as 1875, he began to work in earnest with a "Persian" palette: dark blue, turquoise, manganese purple, green, Indian red, and lemon yellow. Study of the motifs of what he referred to as "Persian" ware (and what we know today as 15th and 16th-century İznik ware), profoundly influenced his unmistakable style, in which fantastic creatures entwined with rhythmic geometric motifs float under luminous glazes.

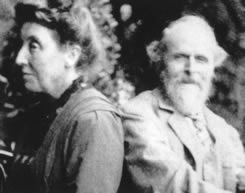
William and his wife Evelyn

The pottery works was beset by financial problems, despite repeated cash injections from his wife, the pre-Raphaelite painter Evelyn De Morgan (née Pickering), and a partnership with the architect Halsey Ricardo. This partnership was associated with a move for the factory from Merton Abbey to Fulham in 1888. During the Fulham period De Morgan mastered many of the technical aspects of his work that had previously been elusive, including complex lustres and deep, intense underglaze painting that did not run during firing. However, this did not guarantee financial success, and in 1907 De Morgan left the pottery, which continued under the Passenger brothers, the leading painters at the works. "All my life I have been trying to make beautiful things", he said at the time, "and now that I can make them nobody wants them."

De Morgan turned his hand to writing novels, and became better known than he ever had been for his pottery. His first novel, Joseph Vance, was published in 1906, and was an instant sensation in the United States as well as the United Kingdom. This was followed by An Affair of Dishonour, Alice-for-Short, and the two-volume It Never Can Happen Again (1909). The genre has been described as "Victorian and suburban".

De Morgan died of trench fever in London in 1917, and was buried in Brookwood Cemetery. Recollections praise him for his personal warmth and the indomitable energy with which he pursued his kaleidoscopic career as designer, potter, inventor and novelist.

== Museums and collections ==
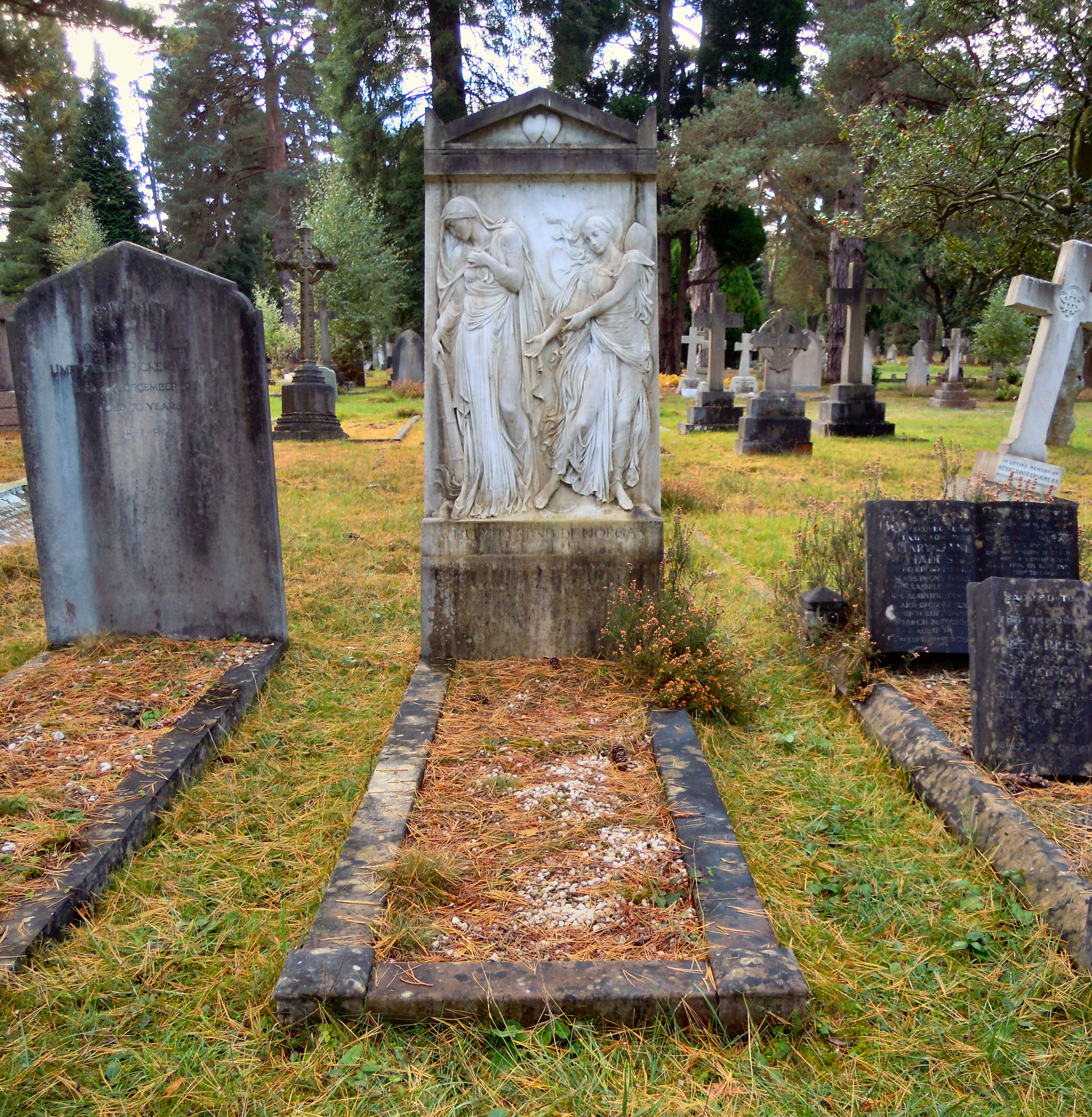
De Morgan's grave in Brookwood Cemetery

Collections of De Morgan's work exist in many museums, including the Victoria and Albert Museum, and the William Morris Gallery in London, a substantial and representative collection in Birmingham Museum and Art Gallery, and a small but well-chosen collection along with much other pottery at Norwich. There was an exhibition of his work and of that of his wife, Evelyn, at the De Morgan Centre in Wandsworth, London (part of Wandsworth Museum) from 2002 until 2014. His Dragon Charger is in the Dunedin Public Art Gallery in New Zealand. The National Gallery of Canada in Ottawa has a good collection of William De Morgan's work given by Ruth Amelia Jackson in 1997 but much of it is kept in store. De Morgan's work is also present in many major collections with decorative art including the Art Gallery of Ontario, Toronto, Canada, the Musée d'Orsay, Paris, Manchester Art Gallery and the Fitzwilliam Museum, Cambridge.

A number of properties in the UK open to the public have tiles and pottery on display or incorporated in the building's decoration. They include Wightwick Manor (the National Trust, Wolverhampton), Standen (the National Trust, East Grinstead), Blackwell (Lakeland Arts Trust, Windermere), Leicester Secular Hall and Leighton House (London Borough of Kensington). His ceramics, papers and artworks by both de Morgans, were collected by his sister-in-law after his death. These are now the collection of the De Morgan Foundation. Long-term loans of these artworks can be seen at Cannon Hall at Cawthorne in Barnsley, with a selection of both William's and Evelyn's work on display in the exhibition 'A Family of Artists', and at Watts Gallery in Surrey and in the De Morgan Collection exhibition in the Malthouse Gallery at Wightwick Manor, a National Trust Arts & Crafts house in Wolverhampton. A selection of ceramics from the De Morgan Collection is on long-term loan to the Ashmolean Museum in Oxford. There are also other, temporary exhibitions from the collection from time to time.

== See also ==
- De Morgan Foundation
- Arts and Crafts movement
