= Sophia Elizabeth De Morgan =

English writer, social reformer and spiritualist

- Born: Sophia Elizabeth Frend; November 10, 1809; London, England
- Died: January 5, 1892 (aged 82)
- Organization: Children's Friend Society
- Known for: Social reform; tutoring Ada Lovelace
- Spouse: Augustus De Morgan
- Children: 7, including William Frend De Morgan and Mary De Morgan
- Parents: William Frend (father); Sarah Blackburne (mother)

Sophia Elizabeth De Morgan (born Sophia Elizabeth Frend; 10 November 1809 – 5 January 1892) was an English writer, social reformer and spiritualist. The eldest child of mathematician and political reformer William Frend and Sarah Blackburne, she grew up within the intellectual and reforming circles associated with the Frend family in early nineteenth-century London. Her activities included women's education, children's welfare, workhouse reform, anti-slavery activism and women's suffrage. She was also an early tutor of Ada Lovelace and later became a confidante of Lovelace's mother, Lady Byron.

== Early life and family background ==
Sophia Elizabeth Frend was born in London, the eldest of seven children of William Frend and his wife Sarah Blackburne. Sarah was the daughter of a clergyman of the established church. Her daughter Mary De Morgan later described the Blackburne family's traditions as in many respects similar to those of William Frend.

William Frend was a mathematician, religious dissenter and political and social reformer who had been a fellow of Jesus College, Cambridge. Sophia's upbringing in London was unusual for a girl of her period. Her father took her with him from a young age and personally supervised much of her education, instructing her in philosophy and Hebrew. She also studied mathematics and astronomy.

The Frend household was associated with an extensive circle of intellectuals, religious dissenters and social reformers. George Dyer was a friend of the family, as was Charles Lamb, who wrote Sophia an acrostic poem based on her name.

In 1820 the family moved from Blackfriars to Stoke Newington. Anna Letitia Barbauld, then in her mid-70s, was a neighbour of the Frends, and Sophia at the age of 11 took part in some of her intellectual games.

The family returned to central London, settling in Tavistock Square, in 1831. De Morgan later recalled that the family found itself among a small community of philanthropists. The intellectual and reforming environment of the Frend household has been identified as an important influence on her later commitment to education and social reform.

== Ada Lovelace and Lady Byron ==
The Frend family had a close relationship with Lady Byron, who sought William Frend's advice concerning the education of her daughter, Ada Lovelace.

In 1828 Sophia began tutoring Lovelace. Ada was also tutored by William King and Arabella Lawrence from about 1830. Sophia initially had reservations about Ada.

Around 1832, Sophia expressed scepticism about a phrenological reading of Ada's head by James De Ville, which had been arranged by Lady Byron. In June 1833 Ada visited Charles Babbage and saw his difference engine, and Sophia reported that Ada had understood the principle of the machine.

Sophia subsequently became a confidante of Lady Byron on family matters. Lady Byron also helped introduce her to organised philanthropy.

== Marriage and family ==
Sophia Elizabeth Frend married the mathematician Augustus De Morgan on 3 August 1837, unconventionally for the period at the registry office in St Pancras. Augustus had been a neighbour of the Frends in Upper Gower Street since 1831, and by the time of the marriage had known the family for around ten years.

The couple had seven children, including the ceramicist, designer and novelist William Frend De Morgan, the mathematician George Campbell De Morgan, and the writer Mary De Morgan.

Their eldest son was given the full name William Frend De Morgan, preserving the Frend name in the next generation. He was named after Sophia's father, William Frend.

There were three sons and four daughters. Their son Edward married Ada Margaret Wright. Their daughter Anne Isabella married the physician Reginald Edward Thompson and was the mother of the archaeologist and Assyriologist Reginald Campbell Thompson.

Their daughters Elizabeth Alice and Helena Christiana died of tuberculosis, in 1853 and 1870 respectively.

== Social reform ==
=== Children's welfare ===
Around 1835 Lady Byron brought Sophia onto the committee of the Children's Friend Society. The society worked with poor and vulnerable children. Her involvement began a long-standing interest in children's welfare and education.

De Morgan supported education for working-class children and later became involved in efforts to provide recreational spaces for children living in densely populated areas of London.

=== Women's education and employment ===
In 1849 De Morgan became involved in the "Ladies' College" project established by Elizabeth Jesser Reid. The project developed into Bedford College, one of the earliest institutions in Britain established to provide higher education for women.

It is thought that De Morgan acted as secretary to early meetings of the group, but she later withdrew because of ill health. Papers concerning her involvement in the foundation of Bedford College survive in archival collections.

She also supported the Society for Promoting the Employment of Women, founded in 1859 to improve women's access to paid employment and vocational opportunities.

=== Prison and workhouse reform ===
The De Morgans came to know the prison reformer Elizabeth Fry through Lady Byron. Through Fry, Sophia became involved in prison and workhouse reform.

After becoming concerned about conditions experienced by the poor in St Pancras, De Morgan sought permission to inspect the local workhouse. Her initial request was refused. She was eventually permitted to visit in 1854 and became involved in a committee of women who regularly visited the wards and considered the welfare of inmates.

De Morgan later wrote about her experiences in Recollections of a London Workhouse Forty Years Ago, which was subsequently published by the Society for Promoting the Return of Women as Poor Law Guardians.

She was also an anti-slavery and women's suffrage advocate.

=== Playgrounds for poor children ===
One of De Morgan's sustained social concerns was the provision of places where poor urban children could play safely. She became a member of a committee for the establishment of playgrounds, founded in 1856.

The campaign sought to provide recreational space for children living in crowded urban areas. De Morgan promoted the cause through her writing, and material advocating playground provision appeared in Household Words, the weekly journal conducted by Charles Dickens, in 1858. She returned to the subject in Good Words in 1867.

Her involvement in the playground campaign formed part of her broader interest in children's welfare, education and conditions among London's working poor.

=== Other causes ===
De Morgan's reforming interests also included anti-slavery activity and women's suffrage. Surviving papers in the De Morgan family archive document her engagement with social and political questions.

Later in life she became a critic of vivisection, objecting to the use of live animals in scientific experimentation.

== Spiritualism ==
De Morgan developed a sustained interest in spiritualism. Her views adapted aspects of the philosophy of Emanuel Swedenborg and later influenced Evelyn Pickering, who married her son William.

Her interest intensified following the death from tuberculosis of her eldest daughter, Alice, in 1853. She investigated séances and other phenomena associated with the developing spiritualist movement. She was particularly impressed, in table-turning, by the medium Daniel Dunglas Home.

In 1863 she published From Matter to Spirit: The Result of Ten Years' Experience in Spirit Manifestations, under the initials "C.D."

== Works ==
De Morgan wrote on spiritualism, social reform and family history. Her works include:

- From Matter to Spirit: the result of ten years' experience in spirit manifestations (1863), as "C.D."
- Playgrounds for Poor Children, published in Good Words (1867)
- Augustus De Morgan (1882)
- Recollections of a London Workhouse Forty Years Ago, subsequently published by the Society for Promoting the Return of Women as Poor Law Guardians
- Threescore Years and Ten: Reminiscences of the late Sophia Elizabeth De Morgan (1895), a memoir edited posthumously by Mary De Morgan.

A play parodying Augustus De Morgan's Elements of Algebra (1835), which was a precursor of the abstract algebra approach, survives in manuscript in Sophia's handwriting. It is attributed to her, or to her father William Frend.
