= Arabella Lawrence =

English educator

Arabella Lawrence (1787–1873) was an English educator, one of the Lawrence sisters, Unitarians who ran a noted school at Gateacre. She is now known as a tutor for Ada Lovelace in the period 1830–2.

== Background ==
The Lawrences were a Birmingham family, in the congregation of the Old Meeting House there that was burned down in the Priestley riots. Nathaniel Lawrence, the father, went bankrupt at the beginning of the French Revolutionary Wars. The daughters of the family sought work as governesses, with the idea of eventually founding a family school.

In a family of eleven children, Nathaniel and Mary Lawrence had nine daughters and two sons, with two of the daughters and the younger son dying young. Eliza, the eldest child, married in 1810, the only daughter to do so, and died the following year. Frances died in 1816. In 1820, the surviving daughters were, in order of age, Sarah, Mary, Arabella, Jane and Harriet.

== School at the Grange, Gateacre ==
They eventually founded a school at Gateacre, then a village outside and now a suburb of Liverpool, a seaport of growing importance. The school, led by Sarah Lawrence, was austere, but over a generation gained a good reputation. An alumna of 1838 wrote:

There must have been a powerful personal influence about the Misses Lawrence, which raised their school to a position of considerable eminence for many years, and sent forth a large number of really superior women.

Emma Willard, the American activist who dedicated her life to women's education, came to London in 1830 as part of her tour of Europe. There she met "two Misses Lawrence" at a social event, and recorded their "dignified manners".

== Paris in 1820 ==
Two of the Lawrence sisters were in Paris in 1820, meeting there Maria Edgeworth, the Irish writer, to whom they had a letter of introduction. The encounter is documented both in an edition of Edgeworth's letters, and in the biography of William Rowan Hamilton, the Irish astronomer and mathematician, by Robert Perceval Graves. Graves gives a confused account of the sisters: but he identifies the elder of the two as the correspondent of Hamilton from 1825. She was Arabella.

The circumstances of the sisters' journey to France are mentioned in the memoirs of the Liverpool merchant Thomas Fletcher (died 1850), business partner of Joseph Brooks Yates. He was connected by family to Peter Crompton, who had employed Sarah Lawrence as governess. In London on business with Kean Osborn, he noted that the "Misses Lawrence" were travelling by coach to the Channel, and then onwards to Paris, with his nephew John Fletcher who was bound for Switzerland. He saw them off, around 20 June.

Edgeworth wrote, in a letter to Mary and Charlotte Sneyd on 7 July:

Two of the Miss Lawrences are at Paris. They are very sensible, excellent women. They brought a letter from Miss Carr, begging me to see them; [...] We took Miss Lawrence to one of the great schools established here on the Lancasterian principles, and we also took her to hear a man lecture upon the mode of teaching arithmetic and geometry which my father has recommended in Practical Education: the sight of the little cubes was at once gratifying and painful.

Maria Edgeworth offered Arabella a governess post, with the Duchess of Orleans, but Arabella turned down the position.

== Correspondent of William Rowan Hamilton ==
The Irish mathematician William Rowan Hamilton nurtured hopes of becoming a poet as a young man. He contacted Arabella Lawrence in 1825 for an opinion on some of his verse. The acquaintance was through Maria Edgeworth. Graves considers it likely that Arabella was on a visit to Maria Edgeworth in Dublin.

In 1829 Hamilton announced that he was giving up on his poetical ambitions. By then, however, he had become a family friend of the Lawrence sisters, on visiting terms.

== Lady Byron and Ada ==
Anne Isabella, Lady Byron, known as Annabella, had her only child by Lord Byron, Ada (born 1815). Arabella's initial contact with the Byron family was by letter, and she recommended a Miss Lamont, who was Irish, to care for Ada. Miss Lamont joined the Byron home at Kirkby Mallory in 1821. Annabella looked for more discipline, Arabella spoke up for Miss Lamont, but Ada was able to dictate what she did. After a short time, Miss Lamont departed. It was the beginning of a correspondence on educational matters that lasted two decades.

In 1828, Lady Byron finished a long European tour, with Ada and a friend, Louise Chaloner, during which she had visited the Swiss school of Philipp Emanuel von Fellenberg at Hofwil. Arabella's educational methods were related to those being introduced in Switzerland, and more advanced than those commonly used in England. Lady Byron was impressed by Arabella's use of linked square boxes, divided up to define the scope of topics.

The Byron household was itinerant, residing in a series of rented houses. Arabella wrote to William Rowan Hamilton in spring 1830 from Hanger Hill (at Ealing), at that time the Byron residence. In summer 1830, when matters around Ada's education came to a head, the Byrons were in Mortlake. Ada in 1829 had lost her governess Miss Stamp, whom she liked, had contracted measles and then for two years suffered from a debilitating post-viral condition which confined her mostly to bed. She was also on bad terms with her mother.

Annabella's initial choice for managing her teenage daughter, supplementing her own care, was Sophia Frend. Sophia, try as she might, did not warm to Ada. Ada was writing to Arabella in 1830, while her mother put together a team of her contacts who might take some responsibility for Ada. The physician William King and Arabella became involved.

According to her mother, Ada had an "argumentative disposition", and she wished Arabella to change it. Arabella's tuition was carried out mostly by correspondence; she visited Mortlake when her work at the school permitted. Ada confided in her about the pain she was experiencing, her mood, and issues with German grammar. Arabella concentrated on history, which Ada enjoyed. In November 1831, Arabella wrote to the historical novelist Jane Porter.

Ethel Colburn Mayne's biography of Lady Byron comments on Arabella's teaching of historical dates "successfully and agreeably". She provided "pasteboard rooms without pictures, and with subdivisions which the pupils were allowed to fill up with the events most interesting to them." Mayne remarks that the approach was innovative. She quotes Arabella as thinking it "curious to observe how the squares were gradually filled up, as the knowledge enlarged."

Annabella further asked Arabella to do something about Ada's habit of "conversational litigation". Arabella upped the ante on the tuition, turning to more demanding texts. Ada asserted herself on paper, referring to Arabella's "habitual maliciousness", and teasing her mother.

The period of tuition came to an end in 1832, when Ada was walking again, and the household moved to Fordhook House, on Ealing Common.

== Later life and death ==
After a period of decline, Sarah Lawrence disposed of the school to new owners in 1839. The sisters moved away, to Leamington Spa. Arabella Lawrence was still at this point in touch with Lady Byron, who wrote that year "If you can find me good and intelligent men desirous of being trained in the agricultural school system, I will give the training gratuitously and they will be sure of situations."

Arabella Lawrence died at home, in Warwick Place, Leamington Spa, on 13 August 1873. She was the last survivor of the Lawrence sisters.
