= The Heart of Princess Joan =

19th century fairy tale

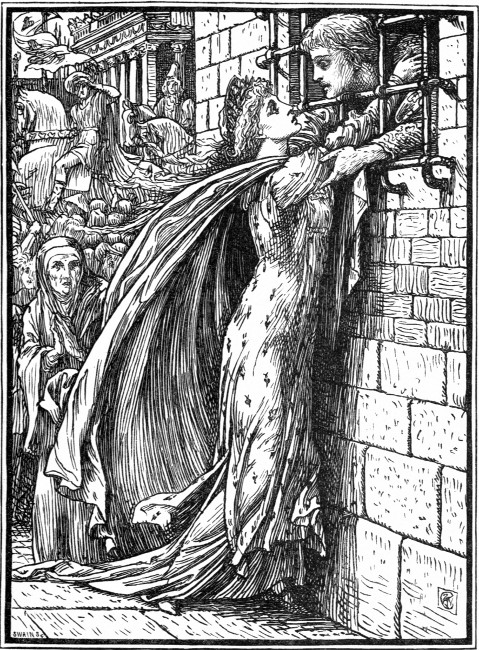
Illustration by Walter Crane for The Heart of Princess Joan, depicting Joan realizing Prince Michael is her beloved.

"The Heart of Princess Joan" is a 19th-century fairy tale published in 1880 as part of the collection The Necklace of Princess Fiorimonde and other Stories. This was the second of three published collections of fairy tales by popular children's author, Mary De Morgan. Illustrations for the stories were provided by Walter Crane.

== About the Author ==
Mary De Morgan was born in 1850 into an intellectual and creative British family. She perfected her literary style by telling uniquely crafted fairy tales to the children of family and friends, who included the Burne-Jones, the Morrises, and the Kiplings. In fact, “The Heart of Princess Joan” is dedicated, with the other stories in the collection, to her nephews and nieces. James Fowler remarks that “she seems to represent a full flowering of the Victorian fairy-tale genre[…].”

== Plot summary ==
The fairy tale opens with a wealthy King and Queen who lived happily. The Queen was prideful and disdained the fairies, and so when she had a baby girl named Joan, the vengeful fairies stole the young child's heart. Joan grew up to be the most beautiful girl in the land, but loved nobody. In the neighboring country, there lived a Prince named Michael – the most gracious man of all. He came across a picture of Joan in an old wizard’s tower, but the wizard warned him to avoid Joan. Regardless of the wizard's warning, Michael wished to marry Joan. Even though Prince Michael's love for Joan grew, he was curious and so disguised himself as a beggar in order to discover what was wrong with the Princess; he soon found she was cold-hearted and ruthless. He spoke to the Queen and learned about her missing heart. He told her he would retrieve Joan's heart, and if he failed to return in seven years, Joan could marry someone else. The wizard learned of these plans and gave Michael a special piece of glass. If he followed the blood-red star through the glass, he would be led to Joan’s heart.

Michael traveled for ages, across land and water. His boat eventually drifted to a land which housed a castle he could not enter. Beside the castle there was an old man and a snake. The old man offered to show Michael the way into the castle, if Michael consented to be his slave until the snake hatched its eggs; Michael agreed. Years and years passed and Michael became angry because the eggs never hatched. He attempted to destroy the eggs but was not successful. As he cried, his tears fell upon them and the shells cracked open. Michael found his way into the castle, and vowed to accept nothing else but the heart of his beloved. A fairy of many disguises encouraged Michael to eat enchanted food, but he was never fooled, since he could see who she really was through his piece of glass. Finally, the fairy gave him the heart of Joan along with some magical words to repeat when seeing her. When Michael returned he was mistakenly imprisoned, but as soon as he saw the Princess through the bars of his cell, he repeated the words, and the heart in his hand fluttered into Joan’s chest. She immediately recognized Michael, insisted they get married, and kissed him in front of all to see. They were wed and the people were happy. “For now we are sure of a good King,” the people said. “See, he has already shown what he can do. Surely no one else could ever have found the heart of Princess Joan.”

== Themes ==
Although De Morgan's stories, including “The Heart of Princess Joan,” have a folk-like feel, they are original and recorded in a style similar to that of Hans Christian Andersen. This might be due to the fact that these stories were told to children before their final form was decided on and then published. This story, in particular, draws on the themes of enduring love and personal sacrifice, which are manifested by the hero, Prince Michael; these are reoccurring themes in De Morgan's stories. Although De Morgan's fairy tales usually comment on Victorian culture, of which she was a part, there is a lack of scholarly discussion about such parallels in “The Heart of Princess Joan.” De Morgan's stories are also said to “question the value of wealth and power.” This is clearly seen in “The Heart of Princess Joan” when Prince Michael is tempted by the sumptuous appearance of the Yellow Fairy's castle, which in truth, turns out to be as hideous and grotesque as the fairy herself.

== 1880 Release Announcement in the London Times ==
“Ready this day, extra fep., 8 vo., 6s, The Necklace of Princess Fiorimonde, and other Stories, By Mary De Morgan. With 25 Illustrations by Walter Crane. Also an edition on large paper, the illustrations on India paper, limited to 100 copies.”

== Published Collections by Mary De Morgan ==
- On a Pincushion (1877)
- The Necklace of Princess Fiorimonde and other Stories (1880)
- The Windfairies (1900)
