= William Booth (forger) =

English yeoman farmer and forger

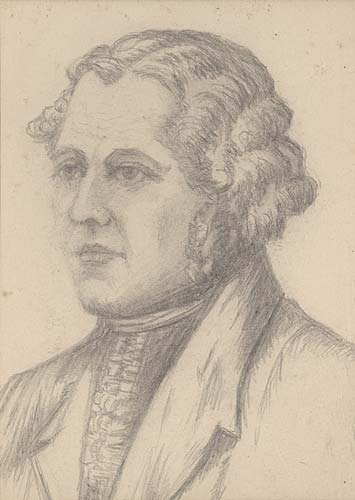
- Pencil sketch of Booth, artist unknown
- Born: c. 1776; Hall End Farm near Beaudesert, Warwickshire, England
- Died: August 15, 1812 (age about 36); Stafford, England
- Resting place: St Mary's Church, Handsworth
- Occupation: Farmer
- Conviction: Forgery
- Penalty: Death by hanging

William Booth (c. 1776 – 15 August 1812) was an English farmer and forger, who was hanged for his crimes. He is the subject of the song "Twice Tried, Twice Hung, Twice Buried" by Jon Raven and a book. Several geographical features in Birmingham, near his former home, carry his name.

== Early life ==
Booth was born at Hall End Farm near Beaudesert, Warwickshire and was baptised at the church there on 21 February 1776. He was one of eight children of a farmer and church warden, John Booth, and his wife Mary.

On 28 February 1799, Booth signed a 25-year lease for what became known (by 1821 if not earlier) as "Booth's Farm", including a farmhouse (Note: Booth's farmhouse: 52.544362°N 1.911063°W) and 200 acres of land, part of the Perry Hall (Note: Perry Hall: 52.52507°N 1.91084°W) estate. The farm was then in Perry Barr, Staffordshire; that part of Perry Barr is now known as Great Barr, and is in the city of Birmingham.

Booth, then described as a yeoman, was accused of murdering his brother John while revisiting Hall End on 19 February 1808, but was acquitted for lack of evidence. (Note: Court documents give Booth's age in 1808 as 30; this does not match his date of baptism.)

== Criminal activity ==
After the Napoleonic Wars caused the government of William Pitt the Younger to order the Bank of England to restrict gold supply—the so-called "Restriction Period"—and to issue new, low-denomination, and easily-reproducible, bank notes, Booth converted the top floor of the farmhouse into a fortified workshop where he produced forgeries of those banknotes, as well as promissory notes, coins, tokens and other material of monetary value.

Once his activities came to light, a raiding party was convened on 16 March 1812, led by a constable from Birmingham, John Linwood, and comprising ten special constables and seven dragoons.

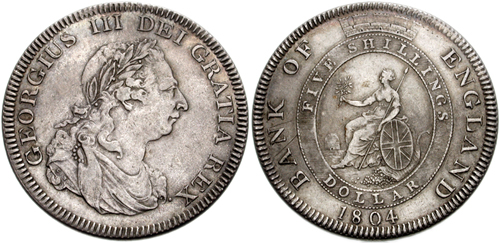
A genuine 1804 George III, five-shilling coin, or dollar, of the type forged by Booth

Booth was arrested, and charged with five counts:

1. "forging a 1l. note, purporting to be a promissory note of the Bank of England"
2. "for making paper, and having in [his] possession and using a mould for making paper, with words 'Bank of England' therein"
3. "for using plates for making promissory notes in imitation of Bank of England notes, and for having blank bank notes in their possession without a written authority from the Governor and Company of the Bank of England, against Statute of 45th Geo. III."
4. "for coining dollars, against the statute 44th Geo. III.—The indictment charged the prisoners with coining a piece of coin called a dollar, having an impression on the obverse side of his Majesty's head, and the words 'Georgius—III. Dei Gratia Rex,' and on the reverse, a figure of Britannia, and the words 'Five Shillings. Dollar. Bank of England, 1804.'"
5. "for coining 3s. Bank Tokens, against the Statute of 51st of his present Majesty"

Each was tried consecutively, with the same jury throughout, before Simon Le Blanc, at Stafford Assizes over two days, on 31 July and 1 August. He was found guilty on all counts and sentenced to hang.

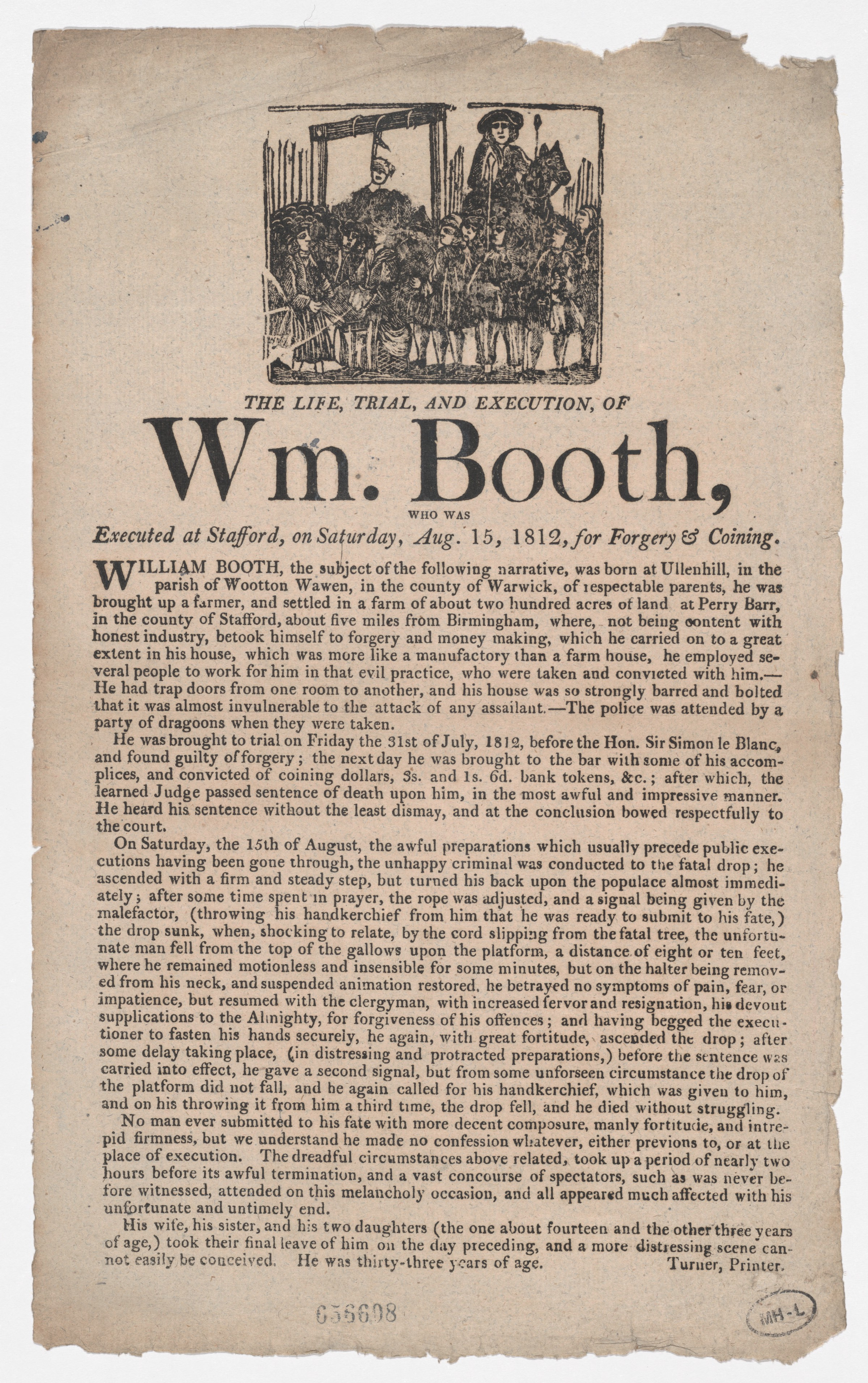
Contemporary broadside, documenting Booth's arrest, trial and execution [transcription]

Booth's public execution, outside Stafford jail, on 15 August 1812 was bungled, and he fell through the scaffold's trap door to the floor. Within two hours, he was hanged again and died. (Note: Booth is often claimed to be one of the last people (if not the last) to be sentenced to death in England for forgery. However, there were 32 such executions in 1817 alone.)

He is buried in the churchyard of St Mary's, Handsworth. (Note: St Mary's Church: 52.51056°N 1.91917°W) The inscription on his gravestone reads: (Note: Note that his stated age again does not match his date of baptism.)

Sacred to the memory of William Booth who departed this life August 15th 1812 aged 33 years. Also Charlotte daughter of William and Mary Booth who died August 13th 5 months.

He was survived by his father, wife, sister and two daughters, aged about fourteen, and three.

Following a change of county boundary, his body was disinterred and reburied.

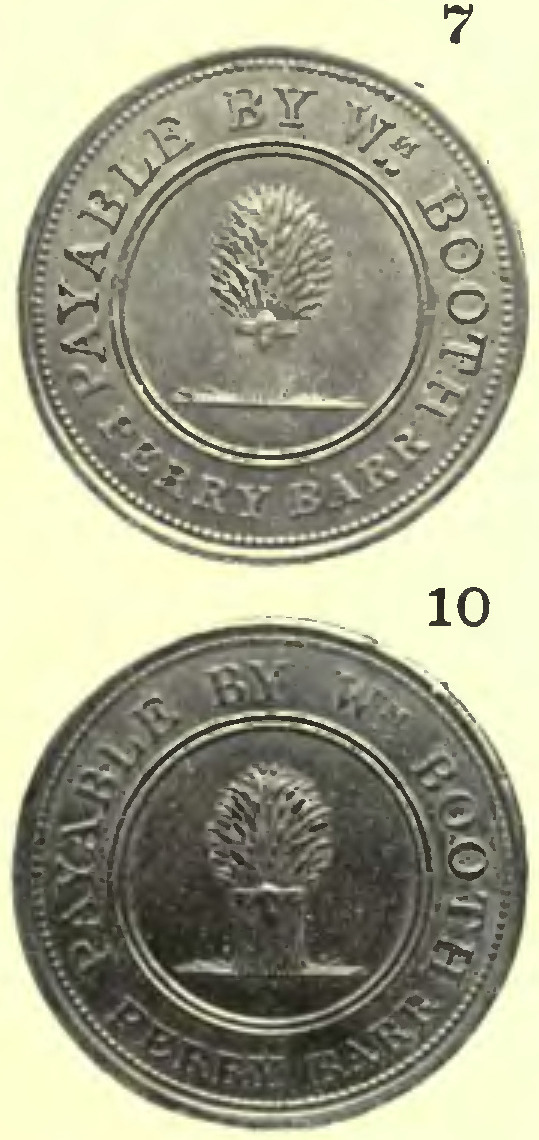
Trade token (obverse) by Booth (lower) and a forgery of the same (upper) (Note: W.J. Davis says of the forgery: "The copy can be detected by noticing that the two stops in "Wm" are much larger and more square than round. The die has failed towards the top of the first upright stem to right. The centre of wheat sheaf is directly under "By," whereas on the genuine piece it is under "Y" only, and the limbs of the "H" in "Booth" are not quite parallel".)

Booth also minted genuine tokens as a cover for his forging activities. Several of his tokens, forgeries and printing plates are in the collection of Birmingham Museum & Art Gallery. One token is in the British Museum. Booth's posthumous notoriety meant that his tokens became so collectable that they themselves became the subject of forgeries.

== Co-conspirators ==
Booth's accomplices were tried alongside him and those convicted were sentenced to transportation to Australia.

Elizabeth Chidlow (or Chedlow) was sentenced to 14 years, departing in August 1813 on the Wanstead. Prior to the voyage, she wrote, from the ship, at Deptford, on 8 July 1813, to the Bank of England:

Honnerd Gentlemen I hope you will Pardon the Liberty I have takeing in Riteing to you But it is nesseaty that oblidges me to it for I am in Grate Distress and as you have Been so Good as to give the other Poor unfortunate Women a little as I was Conveceted at Stafford with Mr Booths and Mrs Booth as Baveid very Ill to me and I am very much in want of nessarys and I hope your Goodness will think of me and your humble Pertichner is in Duty Bound and will for Ever pray for you Elizabeth Chedlow

and received £5 from them as it was their charitable custom to support women sentenced to transportation for forgery. She arrived at Port Jackson (now Sydney), New South Wales on 9 January 1814.

George Scot and John Yates Sr., were each sentenced to be transported for seven years. All the other defendants were acquitted. Booth's wife, who witnesses said was active in the process of making forgeries, was not charged, as wives were considered to be under the control of their husbands.

== Booth's Farm ==
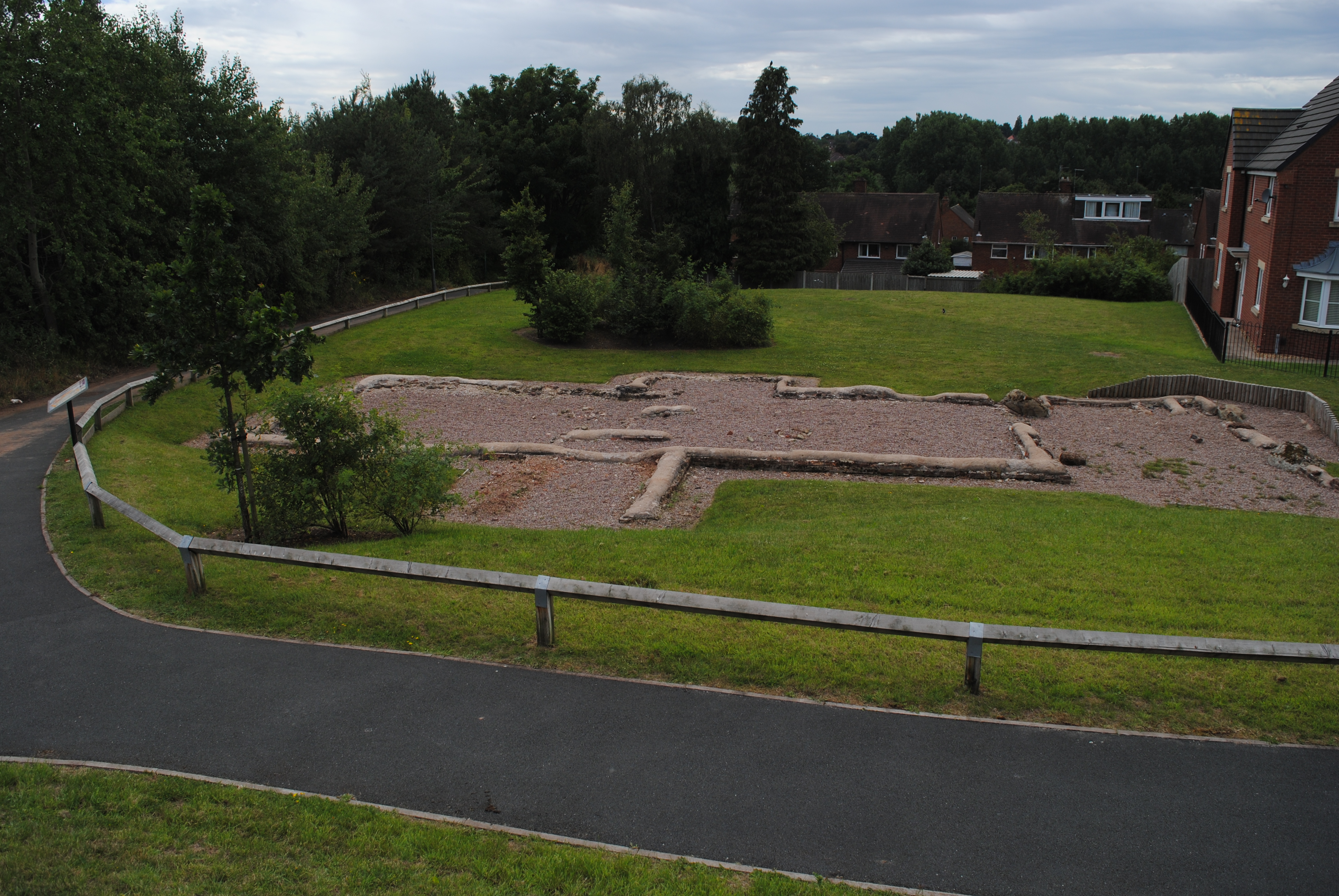
Booth's Farm farmhouse ruins, seen in July 2020. The part nearest to the camera was the entrance porch.

The largely 17th-century farmhouse, albeit including parts of an earlier timber-framed building, was demolished in 1974, much of the farm—still known as Booth's Farm—having been sold off for housing. An archaeological excavation was conducted at that time, with finds including 13th-century pottery. As late as October 1956, 45 bank tokens forged by Booth, using metal alloy instead of silver, were found in a garden on Foden Road, formerly part of the farm.

What remained of the farm became a sand and gravel quarry (the site is on Bunter Pebble Beds), and later a landfill site and eventually a nature reserve, with additional housing built in the 2010s. During the latter period, the buried foundations of the farmhouse were re-exposed and an information board placed alongside them. (Note: As of July 2020, aerial imagery in OpenStreetMap's JOSM editor variously shows the area still grassed over (Bing imagery), or as a worksite (Esri clarity imagery). Google Maps shows the exposed ruins; see "Booth's farmhouse" coordinates.)

== Namesakes ==
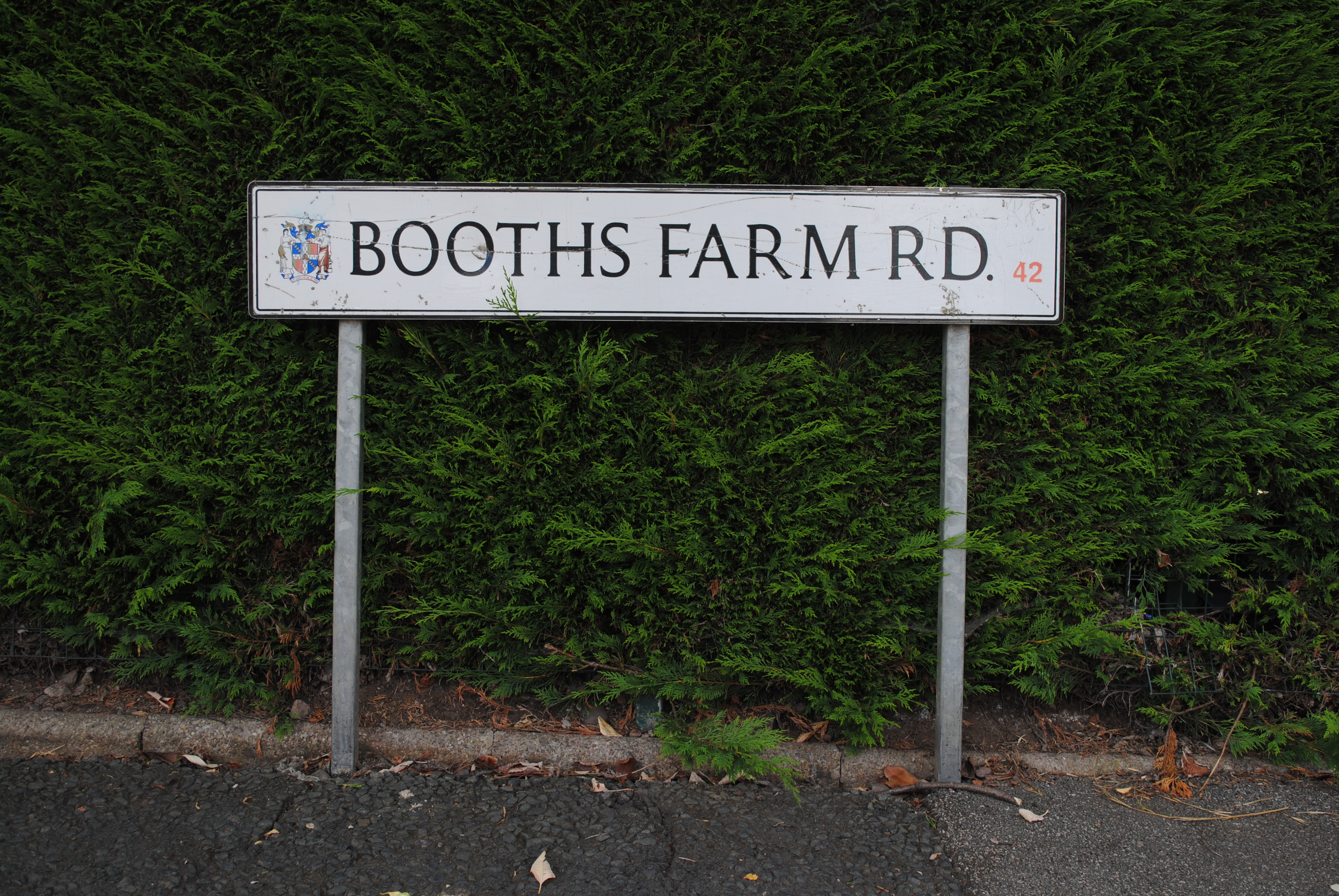
'Booths Farm Rd' street name plate, showing the "B42" postal code

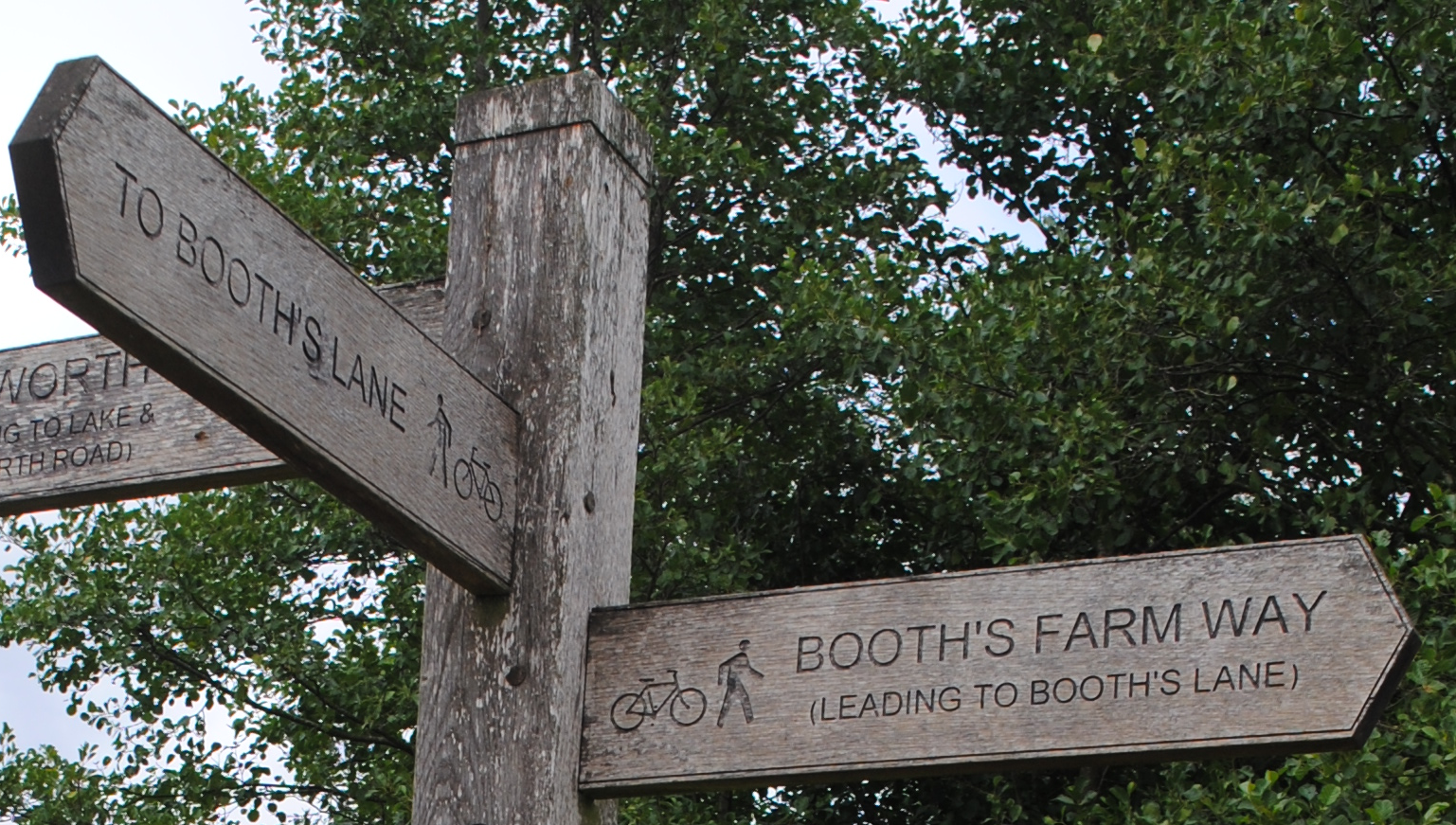
Fingerpost at Queslett Nature Reserve, on the site of Booth's Farm, pointing along a footpath, Booth's Farm Way, to Booth's Lane

Booth and his farm gave their name to the still-extant Booths Lane (Note: Booths Lane: 52.544265°N 1.910232°W) and Booths Farm Road, (Note: Booths Farm Road: 52.54031°N 1.91951°W) now separated from each other by the M6 motorway which bisected the former farm when it opened circa 1972. In the 21st century, Forgers Walk (Note: Forgers Walk: 52.542975°N 1.914309°W)—the pedestrian tunnel under the motorway—and later Booths Farm Walk, (Note: Booths Farm Way: 52.545431°N 1.911193°W) Booths Farm Close, (Note: Booths Farm Close: 52.544435°N 1.911273°W) Forger Lane, (Note: Forger Lane: 52.542924°N 1.909043°W) and Token Rise, all nearby, were so named.

Until the late 1920s, the farm was occupied by the Foden Family, commemorated in Foden Road. (Note: Foden Road: 52.53958°N 1.92093°W)

The area around Booths Farm Road is known as the Booths Farm Estate. (Note: When the Booths Farm Estate was laid out, in the 1920s and 1930s, most of the new roads were named after airfields: Calshot (actually a sea plane base), Cardington, Cramlington, Duxford, Fowlmere, Hamble, Heston, Mildenhall, Northolt, Thetford, Turnberry.)
