= Simon Le Blanc =

Sir Simon Le Blanc
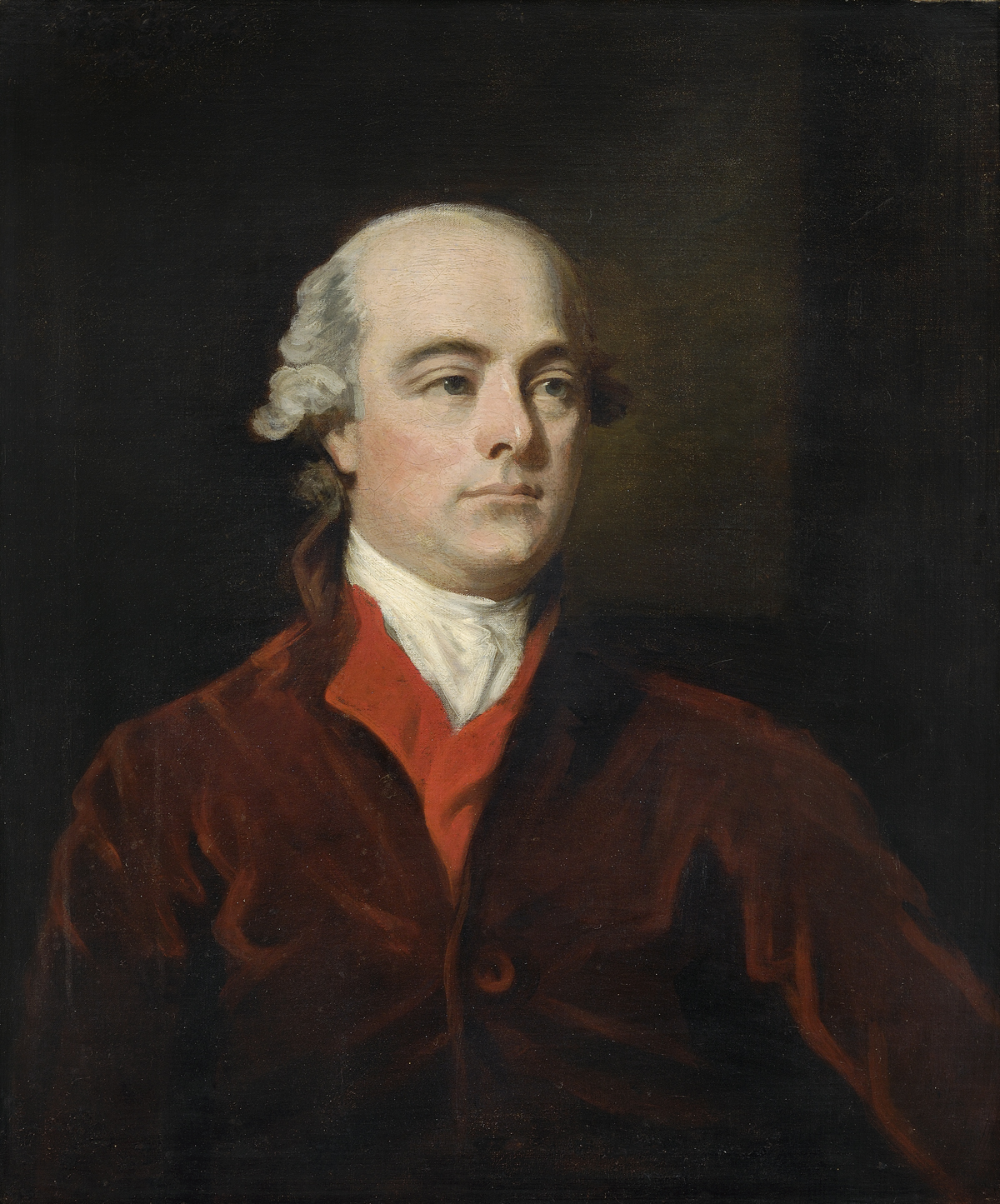
- Simon Le Blanc, portrait by John Opie

puisne judge of the king's bench
- In office c. 9 June 1799 – 15 April 1816

Personal details
- Born: 1748 London
- Died: 15 April 1816 Bedford Square, London
- Education: Trinity Hall, Cambridge

Sir Simon Le Blanc (c.1748 – 1816) was an English judge.

== Early life ==
The second son of Thomas Le Blanc of Charterhouse Square, London, he was born about 1748. In June 1766 he was admitted a pensioner, and in the following November elected scholar of Trinity Hall, Cambridge. In February 1773 he was called to the bar at the Inner Temple, and he graduated LL.B. the same year. In 1779 he was elected a Fellow of his college.

== Legal career ==
Le Blanc went the Norfolk circuit, acquired a considerable practice, and in February 1787 was called to the degree of serjeant-at-law. In 1791 he was appointed counsel to his university, and in this capacity was one of the counsel retained to show cause against a rule obtained by William Frend for a mandamus to restore him to his franchises as resident M.A.

On the resignation of Sir William Henry Ashurst, 9 June 1799, Le Blanc was appointed to succeed him as puisne judge of the king's bench, and knighted. He showed his independence of mind in the case of Haycraft v. Creasy (2 East 92), where he differed from Lord Kenyon, on a point of law which the latter had long treated as established. For his part in two trials for murder on the high seas, which had terminated in acquittals in December 1807 and January 1808, he was charged in the Independent Whig with perverting justice out of mistaken humanity; though. the responsibility for the verdict in both cases rested with the jury. The attorney-general filed an ex officio information for libel against the printer and publisher of the paper, who were tried and found guilty.

At the Lancaster spring assizes in 1809 Joseph Hanson, a gentleman of property, was indicted before Le Blanc for a misdemeanour in abetting the weavers of Manchester in a conspiracy to raise their wages. Le Blanc summed up the case, and the jury found for the Crown. Le Blanc, however, reserved judgment, which was afterwards given by the court of king's bench, Hanson being sentenced to six months' imprisonment and a fine of £100. At Stafford in 1812, he passed a death sentence on the forger William Booth. At York in 1813 Le Blanc opened, with Sir Alexander Thomson, a special commission for the trial of Luddites, under which some of the conspirators were condemned. His ruling in Rex v. Creevey (1 Maule and Selwyn, 273), decided the same year, to the effect that a Member of Parliament may be convicted for libel for circulating a newspaper report of a speech delivered in parliament, though the speech itself is privileged, became a leading authority on the law of libel.

== Death and legacy ==
Le Blanc died unmarried on 15 April 1816 at his house in Bedford Square, and was praised by the reporters George Maule and William Selwyn, in recording the fact. He was buried in the church at Northaw, Hertfordshire, where a tablet was placed to his memory. His seat, Northaw House, passed by his will to his brothers, Charles and Francis Le Blanc.

Le Blanc left some manuscript reports, which were incorporated by Henry Roscoe in the third and fourth volumes of Douglas's Reports, London, 1831.
