= Henry William Coulthurst =

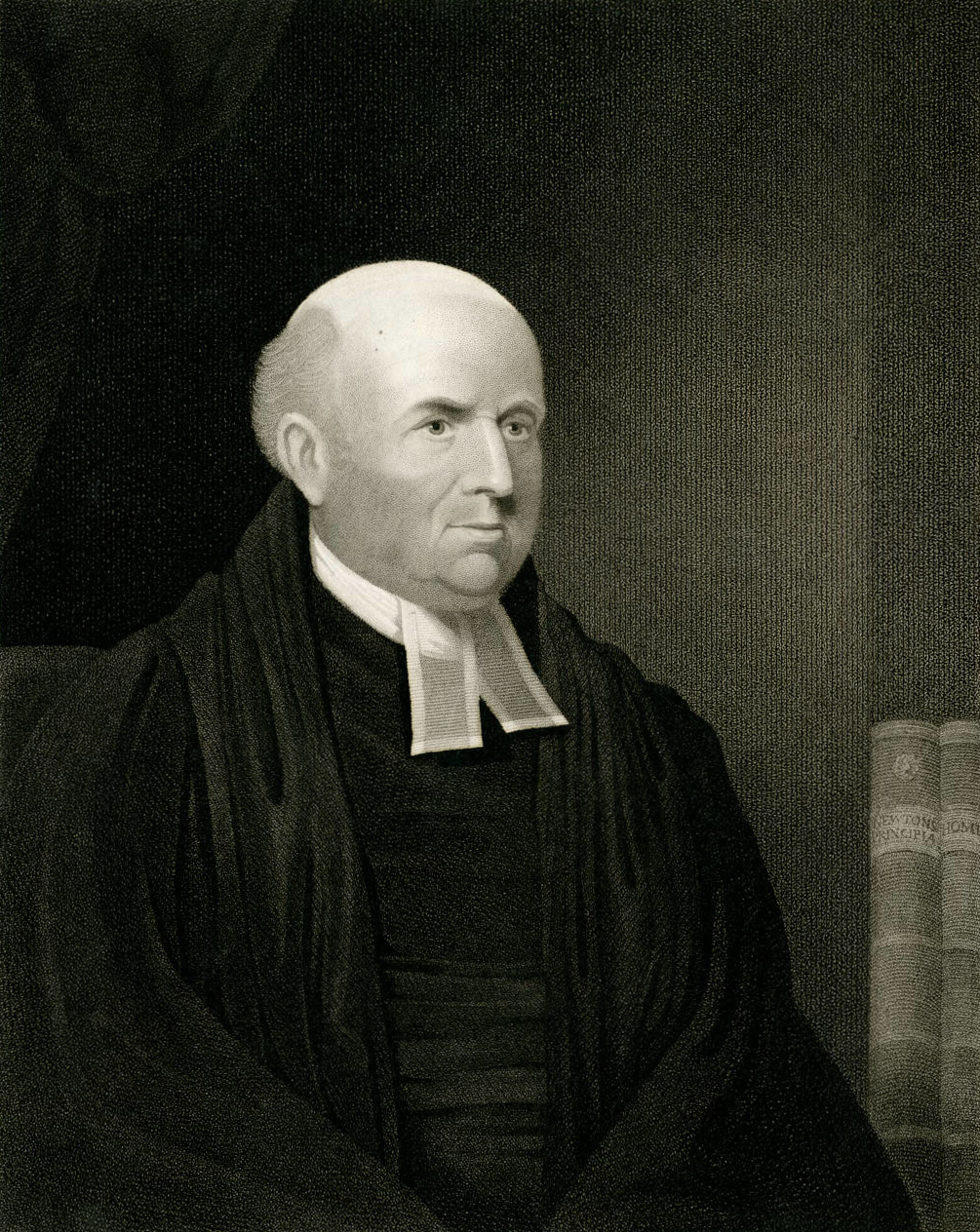
Henry William Coulthurst

Henry William Coulthurst (1753 – 11 December 1817) was a British clergyman and academic.

== Early life and background ==
He was born in Barbados into a slave-owning family, the son of Henry Coulthurst, and became joint owner of a plantation in Demerara. One of his brothers was Tempest Coulthurst the physician. His "West Indian fortune" was later mentioned as one of his characteristics, with "learning, character" and "efficiency in duty".

Coulthurst was educated in Yorkshire, England at Skipton and Hipperholme. He matriculated at St John's College, Cambridge in 1771, graduating B.A. in 1775, M.A. in 1778. In mathematics he was second wrangler, behind Samuel Vince. A friend and correspondent was the preacher Bryan Bury Collins, a contemporary at St John's.

== Academic and cleric ==
Coulthurst was ordained deacon in 1776, and became a Fellow of Sidney Sussex College in 1781. From 1782 to 1790 he was minister at Holy Sepulchre, Cambridge. He graduated B.D. in 1785, D.D. in 1791, and took part in a celebrated Divinity Act (formal theological disputation) with Isaac Milner.

As a young Fellow Coulthurst supported the abolitionist cause in Cambridge. He became a friend of William Wilberforce. He is mentioned by Thomas Clarkson as one of those who came forward to help the abolitionist committee in the period from 1788 of agitation against the Atlantic slave trade.

After making public his opposition to a 1787 proposal by Thomas Edwards to change Cambridge's religious tests, in 1788 Coulthurst became involved in religious controversy with William Frend, on the orthodox side of the anti-Trinitarian debate. Frend published a leaflet series Mr Coulthurst's blunders exposed. Theophilus Lindsey in December 1788 noted that one of the leaflets was a reply to a sermon by Coulthurst that Frend had attended. The fifth leaflet, dated 18 February 1789, related to the Johannine Comma, and in it Frend cited in support Richard Porson ("Cantabrigiensis"), from his controversy with George Travis.

Lindsey also commented that Coulthurst was "one of those that are reckoned Methodists" in various Cambridge colleges, which in the language of the time implied an evangelical. Henry Venn, a visitor in 1787, mentioned a Cambridge evangelical group including Coulthurst and Charles Simeon with whom he sat up late talking, five nights in a row, comprising also Charles Farish, and Henry and Joseph Jowett.

== Vicar of Halifax ==
Coulthurst was appointed vicar of Halifax, Yorkshire in 1790, with the advantage of support from William Pitt the younger. He took John Brathwaite Skeete (born 1775) from Barbados as a pupil, who went on to Sidney Sussex College in 1793. In 1793 Wilberforce arranged for Coulthurst to preach in Somerset, as reported by Hannah More who was then living near Wrington, to Sir Charles Middleton.

Describing in 1795 his parish as containing 70,000 people and being as large as Rutland, Coulthurst expressed concern that no magistrate was active there. He was appointed a justice of the peace for the West Riding. In 1796 he preached a noted university sermon, backing the measures against subversion taken by the administration of William Pitt, one of a number of evangelicals taking a loyalist line at the time. In a letter of 31 October 1797 he agreed to support the missionary projects of Charles Simeon, a friend. The context was of attacks on Simeon by the "Jacobinical" Benjamin Flower and Robert Hall.

The triennial Halifax music festival was founded in 1796 by Coulthurst, Sir George Armytage, 4th Baronet and Godfrey Wentworth Wentworth as patrons; it continued to 1830.

Coulthurst ministered at Halifax Parish Church, and is noted as the first evangelical to do so. The former Holy Trinity Church, Halifax was built for Coulthurst, by an act of Parliament, and completed in 1798. The design was by Thomas Johnson of Leeds. Since 1980 it has been used as offices. That church was built at Coulthurst's own expense, and he also contributed to the upkeep of a number of the chapels in his parish, building one more. At his death there were 14 subordinate chapels in the parish, and in his annual parish tour, Coulthurst preached at all of them. His chaplains preached in them monthly, on a Wednesday.

The Church Missionary Society in 1799 nominated Country Members to its committee, and Coulthurst was one of them. In 1807 the Halifax General Dispensary was set up, an initiative of Coulthurst's.

Coulthurst was active in 1812 as a magistrate at Halifax, against Luddism.

== Death ==
Coulthurst died on 11 December 1817, at Heath Hall, near Wakefield, Yorkshire. It was the home of his friend John Smyth (1748–1811), by then inherited by his son John Henry Smyth, both Members of Parliament. William Willmott, a Halifax curate, preached a memorial sermon in the Parish Church on 21 December.

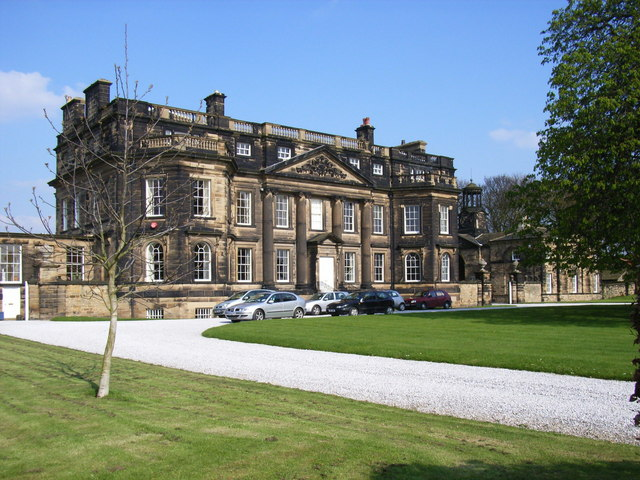
Heath Hall, Wakefield today

== Works ==
Coulthurst published:

- The Citizen and Soldier. The Substance of a Sermon Preached in Halifax Church, on Sunday the Seventeenth of August, 1794, Before the Loyal Corps of Halifax Volunteers (1795)
- The Evils of Disobedience and Luxury. a Sermon Preached Before the University of Cambridge, on Tuesday, October 25, 1796 (1796). This sermon in loyalist tone received comment, and was translated into English verse by Alexander Geddes, writing as "H. W. Hopkins" a "Hudibrastic paraphrase".
- A Sermon, Preached in the Parish Church of Halifax, Before the Volunteer Corps of Infantry: Of the Town and Parish of Halifax, on Sunday, 29 January 1804 (1804)

== Family ==
In 1793 Coulthurst married Sarah Whitacre, daughter of John Whitacre of Woodhouse, Huddersfield.

=== Family stake in Holy Trinity Church, Halifax ===
This church, financed by Coulthurst, was built under agreements that involved his family. Three further nominations were in the hands of family representatives. Coulthurst and his heirs could rent out the pews and galleries, and sell 20% of the land attached as burying ground, at prices regulated by the Archbishop of York.

The first incumbent was an evangelical, Samuel Knight (1757–1827) of Magdalene College, Cambridge, nominated by Coulthurst. He was succeeded in 1817, around the time of Coulthurst's death, by his son James Knight. William Willmott was perpetual curate there from 1818 to 1835. He was succeeded by Frederick Russell, M.A. of St Mary Hall, Oxford, a Caribbean connection being through his wife Ellen Cosens.

=== Demerara estate ===
After Henry Coulthurst the elder died in 1792, the bulk of his estate was divided equally between five sons including Henry William (then William Henry). In 1816 Coulthurst's brother Tempest died, leaving him a one-fifth share. H. W. Coulthurst has been identified in as an owner in 1817 of the Grove estate in Demarara. It was not mentioned in Coulthurst's will of 1818. Of the brothers, Conrade (died 1836) was an attorney in London, tenant on Bakers estate in Barbados, and Matthew died in 1833. The other brother was named William.
