= The Necklace of Princess Fiorimonde =

1880 fairy tale by Mary de Morgan

"The Necklace of Princess Fiorimonde" is a fairy tale written by Mary De Morgan (1850–1907) in her collection of short stories called "The Necklace of Princess Fiorimonde and Other Stories." This collection of fairy tales originally published in 1880. Mary de Morgan helped to make the Victorian era prominent in literature. In her short stories, she is able to use "mystery, pathos, and comedy" to create entertaining and imaginative literature for all to enjoy. In addition, de Morgan uses both female and male protagonists in her writing exhibiting her belief in equality among the sexes. In many of her works, Mary de Morgan uses elements from the folk tales of medieval England. This is apparent in the universality of her literature, as it was easily relatable to all in Victorian England despite the different socioeconomic classes.

The fairy tale of "The Necklace of Princess Fiorimonde" is about a young wicked princess named Fiorimonde. With the help of a witch, Fiorimonde uses magic to maintain her beauty. When the King wishes her to marry, Fiorimonde, not wishing her suitors to discover her secret, transforms them into beautiful beads on a necklace. Her maid Yolande, and a friend of one of the suitors, learn of the Princess' wickedness and wish to free her suitors from her curse. She is only defeated when she herself is transformed into a bead on the necklace.

== Summary ==
Fiorimonde is a beautiful princess whose father is a powerful yet kind king. The princess is a most beautiful yet cruel woman, who practices black magic and witchcraft. Every night, while the rest of the castle sleeps, Princess Fiorimonde travels to a small hut on the side of a mountain where an old and ugly witch teaches her sorcery, and whose magic maintains the Princess' beauty.

As she grows older, the princess's widowed father, with no male heir to his throne, decides it is time for the princess to marry. The Princess knows that should she be wed, her husband will discover her secret that she visits the witch each night and will force her to stop practicing magic, which will cause her to lose her beauty.

That night, the princess goes to the old Witch's hut and asks for advice. The witch offers Fiorimonde a magic gold thread which will turn her suitors into beads should they wrap their fingers around it. Fiorimonde is warned that should she wrap her fingers around the thread, she too will become a bead, and only by the thread being cut and a bead being extracted from the thread, can a bead return to its human form.

The next day, Fiorimonde's father announces that a foreign king has come to marry his daughter. Fiorimonde tricks this king, and all other suitors who come after him, and turns them into beads. Fiorimonde gains the reputation of a princess whose suitors mysteriously disappear. Only Yolande, the Princess' maid, knows what has happened to the suitors, but dares not directly confront her, knowing that she is a sorceress.

One day, after many suitors have come and gone, Prince Florestan tries his luck with the Princess, despite the warnings of his friend Gervaise that all who go to marry Princess Fiorimonde go missing. Prince Florestan goes missing as well. Gervaise however, is told by the Princess's maid, Yolande, of the Princess's sorcery. That night, in an effort to save Prince Florestan and the others, Gervaise and Yolande go to cut the thread from the sleeping Princess's neck. However, Yolande herself becomes a bead in the process.

A few days later, Gervaise returns to Princess Fiorimonde's palace disguised as a Prince. Upon arrival, Gervaise begins to provoke the Princess by saying that he has seen a more beautiful woman than her. Angered, the Princess asks Gervaise to bring this woman to her. Gervaise refuses and leaves. However, he comes back the next day with the necklace, claiming it is a magical necklace. The vain princess believes that Gervaise's necklace must be the source of the mysterious woman's beauty and agrees to exchange necklaces. However, as soon as her fingers wrap around the necklace, she herself becomes a bead.

Gervaise then cuts the golden thread and removes each bead on the necklace at a time, which allows for the returning Princes to tell their stories to the King. Therefore, this proves the wickedness of the princess. Finally, Gervaise removes the beads that are Yolande and his dear friend Prince Florestan. In his humility, the King asks how he can ever repay Gervaise and the other Princes who have been subject to his daughters' cruelty. Gervaise only requests that the bead representing Princess Fiorimonde never be removed from the gold thread, and that the necklace be hung as a warning for others who are as wicked as she is. Agreeing to Gervaise's advice, the King and his court hang the necklace at the town-hall for all to see the princess' punishment. The princes all return to their kingdoms. Gervaise marries Yolande and brings her back to his home with Prince Florestan and they all live happily ever after.

== Publication ==
"The Necklace of Princess Fiorimonde and Other Stories" was written in 1880 and published in London by Macmillan & Co in 1886.
