= William Frend (reformer) =

English clergyman and social reformer (1757–1841)

William Frend FRAS (22 November 1757 – 21 February 1841) was an English clergyman (later Unitarian), social reformer and writer. After a high-profile university trial in Cambridge, which deprived him of his residency rights as fellow of his college, he became a leading figure in London radical circles.

Modern scholarship has also placed Frend within a wider multigenerational intellectual network. Historian Joan L. Richards has examined Frend and his wife Sarah Blackburne as the second generation of a family whose members shared a commitment to reason across religion, politics, science and education, linking the Blackburne and Lindsey families with the later Frend and De Morgan families.

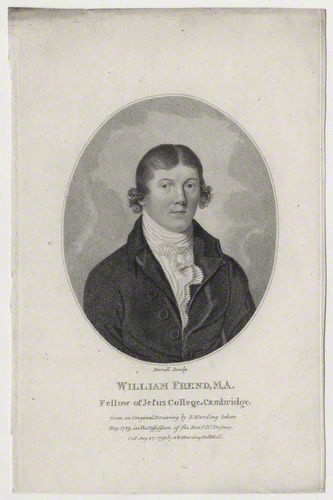
William Frend, 1793 engraving by Andrew Birrell, after Sylvester Harding.

== Early life ==
He was born on 22 November 1757 at Canterbury, the second son of George Frend, a tradesman, alderman, and twice its mayor. His mother was buried in the cloister yard on 7 February 1763, and his father married at the cathedral, on 25 September 1764, Jane Kirby. Frend was educated at The King's School until 1771; among his companions were his cousin Herbert Marsh, and Charles Abbott. His father intended him for business, and he was sent to Saint-Omer in the Pas-de-Calais to learn French, and then to a mercantile house (trading company) in Quebec, where he remained for a few weeks. During his time there he served as a volunteer at the beginning of the troubles with the American colonies.

== At Cambridge ==
On his return home Frend expressed a wish to train for the ministry within the Church of England, and on the recommendation of Archbishop of Canterbury John Moore he entered Christ's College, Cambridge, on 18 December 1775, where William Paley was one of the college tutors. After gaining various college prizes he took the degree of B.A. in 1780, being second wrangler and winning Smith's Prize. Having gained the notice of Lynford Caryl, Master of Jesus College, he migrated there, becoming a Fellow and tutor in 1781.

At the end of 1780 he was admitted deacon in the Church of England, and advanced to the priesthood in 1783, when he was presented to the living of Madingley, near Cambridge, where he officiated zealously until June 1787. During this period of his life the post of tutor to the Archduke Alexander of Russia was offered to him, but he declined it.

In 1787 Frend left the Church of England, in which he had been ordained, to become a Unitarian. At that time, candidates for the Master of Arts had to "subscribe to" (state their belief in—the literal meaning is "sign below") the Thirty-nine Articles, the historically defining statements of doctrines of the Church of England with respect to the controversies of the English Reformation. Frend published his Address to the Inhabitants of Cambridge in favour of his new creed, and he supported vigorously a proposal introduced into the senate house (i.e. the governing body of the university) on 11 December 1787 that would render this statement of belief no longer necessary.

Frend was removed by Richard Beadon from the office of tutor by an order dated 27 September 1788, and his appeal was dismissed by the visitor, the Bishop of Ely, by a decree dated 29 December 1788.

He took, in company with an old schoolfellow called Richard Tylden, a lengthy tour in France, the Low Countries, Germany, and Switzerland. When he returned home he resumed the study of Hebrew. Joseph Priestley devised in 1789 a plan for a new translation of the scriptures, with Frend, Michael Dodson and Theophilus Lindsey; and through 1790 Frend was engaged on translating the historical books of the Old Testament. He also became close to the Baptist Robert Robinson, who died in 1790, and he corrected Robinson's posthumous volume of Ecclesiastical Researches.

== Trial and aftermath ==
In 1793 Frend wrote a tract entitled Peace and Union recommended to the Associated Bodies of Republicans and Anti-republicans, in which he denounced abuses and condemned much of the liturgy of the Church of England. On 4 March certain members of the senate met on the invitation of the vice-chancellor, Dr. Isaac Milner, and resolved that Frend should be prosecuted in the vice-chancellor's court. They deputed a committee of five to conduct the proceedings, one of the leaders being Thomas Kipling. On 23 April a summons was issued by that official requiring Frend's presence in the law schools on 3 May to answer the charge of having violated the laws and statutes of the university by publishing the pamphlet. After several sittings and a long defence by Frend, the vice-chancellor and heads gave their decision on 28 May that the authorship had been proved and that Frend had offended against the statute de concionibus.

Frend was ordered to retract and confess his error, and as he declined was 'banished from the university' (30 May). An appeal against the sentence followed, and the university counsel including the barrister Simon Le Blanc became involved; it was unanimously affirmed by the delegates on 29 June, and on 26 November 1795 the Court of King's Bench discharged a rule which Frend had obtained for restoring him to the franchises of a resident M.A. The master and fellows of Jesus College decided, on 3 April 1793, that in consequence of this pamphlet he should not be allowed to reside in the college until he could produce satisfactory proofs of good behaviour. He thereupon appealed to the visitor, but on 13 July that appeal was dismissed. In spite of all these proceedings he enjoyed the emoluments of his fellowship until his marriage, and remained, while he lived, a member of his college and of the senate of the university.

== Accounts of the trial ==
The proceedings attracted wide attention. One of Frend's supporters was Samuel Taylor Coleridge, then an undergraduate. Henry Gunning, in his Reminiscences (i. 280–309), reprints an account of the trial, and, while condemning the tone of the pamphlet, describes the proceedings as a party move and vindicates the tract from the accusation of sedition. He adds that the vice-chancellor was biased against the accused, and that the undergraduates, among whom Coleridge was conspicuous, were unanimous in his favour. Augustus De Morgan wrote that chalked graffiti "Frend for ever" appeared; bishop-to-be Herbert Marsh was apprehended, while two other future establishment pillars, John Singleton Copley and William Rough escaped. Milner later wrote identifying Frend and his "party" in the university as "Jacobinical", and commenting that the trial had been a turning point for them.

His trial was described by Frend himself in An Account of the Proceedings in the University of Cambridge against William Frend, 1793, and in A Sequel to the Account &c., which dealt with the application to the Court of King's Bench in 1795. John Beverley also published accounts of the proceedings in 1793. Two letters from Richard Farmer to Samuel Parr on this trial are in Parr's Works, and in the same set is a long letter from Frend on the treatment which Thomas Fyshe Palmer, another reformer, had just received.

Many years later, in 1837, Frend gave Henry Crabb Robinson some anecdotes about his trial; and said that the promoters wished to expel him from the university, but that he had demanded a sight of the university roll, and on reference to the original document it was discovered that an informality existed which made his expulsion invalid.

== Later life ==
On leaving Cambridge he came to London. He maintained himself by teaching and writing, to supplement his continuing fellowship stipend. It was at Frend's house that William Wordsworth met William Godwin, on 27 February 1795. The company there that evening included George Dyer, Thomas Holcroft, James Losh, and John Tweddell. Frend was one of the orators in the mass meetings called by the London Corresponding Society in late 1795, with John Ashley, Matthew Brown, Richard Hodgson, John Gale Jones, John Richter, and John Thelwall. Also of this circle was Mary Hays; an attachment to Frend ended in an unsatisfactory fashion, Frend claiming that marriage was not possible on financial grounds; and she wrote autobiographically about the relationship in her first novel, Memoirs of Emma Courtney (1796).

Frend was one of the group of reformers who supported at this time the early activities of the Literary Fund set up by David Williams. There he worked alongside Thomas Christie, Alexander Jardine, James Martin, and John Hurford Stone. Their views, however, did not have it all their own way.

In 1806 he took part in the formation of the Rock Life Assurance Company, to which he was appointed as actuary. He continued in radical activities, participating around 1810 in a fundraising committee, with Timothy Brown, John Cartwright, William Cobbett, and Robert Waithman, to support Gwyllym Lloyd Wardle.

A severe illness in 1826 compelled him to offer his resignation, which was accepted in 1827 when an annuity was given to him. His health subsequently recovered, and he resumed an active life. Frend and Joshua Milne, another actuary, were consulted by the statistician John Rickman about the 1831 census. In 1840 he was attacked by paralysis. He lingered with almost total loss of speech and motion, though mentally alert. He died at his house, Tavistock Square, London, on 21 February 1841.

== Associations, influence and views ==
In 1808 Frend married Sarah Blackburne, a daughter of the Rev. Francis Blackburne, (Note: the son of Francis Blackburne (priest)) vicar of Brignall in Yorkshire, and granddaughter of Archdeacon Francis Blackburne. They had seven children, and their eldest daughter, Sophia Elizabeth, married in the autumn of 1837 Augustus De Morgan. Another daughter married Arthur Philpott, whose daughter Agnes Philpott married John Seeley.

The intellectual context of Frend's marriage and family has received greater attention in later scholarship. Joan L. Richards places William and Sarah Blackburne Frend at the centre of the second generation of a family network extending from Theophilus Lindsey and Hannah Blackburne Lindsey to Sophia Frend and Augustus De Morgan. Richards argues that a shared commitment to rational inquiry shaped the religious, political, scientific and educational interests of successive generations. She describes Sarah as an important partner in William's life during his career as a radical political thinker and writer.

The Frend household also formed part of the environment in which Sophia Elizabeth Frend was educated before her marriage to Augustus De Morgan. Richards treats Sophia and Augustus as the third generation of the same intellectual family, with interests extending into mathematics, logic, social reform and spiritualism.

Among Frend's pupils were Edward Daniel Clarke, Ada Lovelace, John Singleton Copley, and Robert Malthus; he was himself the last of "the learned anti-Newtonians and a noted oppugner of all that distinguishes Algebra from Arithmetic." In Cambridge the leading intellectual dissenters formed a circle including George Dyer, Benjamin Flower, Robert Hall and Robert Tyrwhitt, as well as Frend and Robert Robinson.

Frend was a Unitarian and a Whig by conviction. Reformers such as Francis Burdett and John Horne Tooke were his friends, and he maintained correspondence with supporters of radicalism. Francis Place acknowledged an intellectual debt to Frend. Frend's Unitarian network, as well as the group round Priestley, included James Gifford the elder and Robert Hibbert. When it came to Godwin, Frend like others had difficulties with his atheism.

He was frequently consulted by John Palmer in support of his claim for a public grant for his services in improving the transmission of letters. Frend thought that the rate of postage should be reduced to a fixed charge of one or two pennies, and drew up a statement to that effect. It reached a member of Robert Peel's cabinet, but nothing came of it at that time.

=== Wider Frend family ===
A later member of the wider Frend family was the ecclesiastical historian and archaeologist William Hugh Clifford Frend (1916–2005). In its biographical memoir of W. H. C. Frend, the British Academy identifies William Frend (1757–1841) as his great-great-uncle. The memoir also notes William Frend's Unitarian and political dissent when discussing W. H. C. Frend's own scholarly interest in religious dissent and controversy in the history of Christianity.

W. H. C. Frend became a leading historian of early Christianity and an archaeologist, serving as Professor of Ecclesiastical History at the University of Glasgow and being elected a Fellow of the British Academy in 1983.

== Works ==
Frend's works dealt with many subjects. His publications were:

- An Address to the Inhabitants of Cambridge and its Neighbourhood ... to turn from the false Worship of Three Persons to the Worship of the One True God (St. Ives, 1788). The second edition was entitled An Address to the Members of the Church of England and to Protestant Trinitarians in General, and it was followed by A Second Address to the Members of the Church of England. These were reprinted in Six Tracts in Vindication of the Worship of One God, and in other unitarian publications, and were answered by the Rev. Henry William Coulthurst, by George Townsend of Ramsgate in two tracts (1789), and by Alexander Pirie in a volume issued at Perth (1792). Frend responded in Thoughts on Subscription to religious tests ... in a letter to the Rev. H. W. Coulthurst, and in Mr. Coulthurst's blunders exposed, or a review of his several texts. For these pamphlets Frend was expelled from the Society for Promoting Christian Knowledge (An Account of some late Proceedings of the Society (1789).
- Peace and Union Recommended to the Associated Bodies of Republicans and Anti-Republicans (1793)
- Peace and Union recommended, &c., 1793; (2nd ed. 1793), in which he described the evils of the then parliamentary system and of the game and poor laws, and explained the necessity for numerous reforms. The offending passages are set out in the second edition in single inverted commas.
- Scarcity of Bread: a plan for reducing its high price (1795), two editions. He urged subscriptions by the rich for the relief of the poor.
- Principles of Algebra (1796) (with a very long appendix by Francis Maseres) (pt.ii. 1799). Frend rejected the use of negative quantities.
- A Letter to the Vice-chancellor of Cambridge, by Wm. Frend, candidate for the Lucasian Professorship(1798).
- Principles of Taxation (1799), advocating a graduated system of income-tax.
- Animadversions on Bishop Pretyman's Elements of Christian Theology (1800); to which Joshua Toulmin replied in a preface to his Four Discourses on Baptism.
- The Effect of Paper Money on the Price of Provisions, (1801), which was provoked by the controversy between Sir Francis Baring and Walter Boyd.
- The Gentleman's Monthly Miscellany, which lived for a few months of 1803, and was edited in whole or in part by Frend.
- Evening Amusements, or the Beauty of the Heavens Displayed (1804 to 1822), "an astronomical elementary work of a new character, which had great success; the earlier numbers went through several editions".
- Patriotism: an Essay dedicated to the Volunteers(1804)
- Tangible Arithmetic, or the Art of Numbering made Easy by means of an Arithmetical Toy(1805).
- A Letter on the Slave Trade (1816)
- The National Debt in its True Colours (1817). Reprinted in the Pamphleteer, ix. 415–32. He advocated its extinction by an annual sinking fund.
- Memoirs of a Goldfinch, a poem, with notes and illustrations on natural history and natural philosophy (anon.) (1819).
- Is it Impossible to Free the Atmosphere of London in a very considerable degree from Smoke?. A few copies only for friends, but it was reproduced in the Pamphleteer (1819, vol. xv. 61-5)
- A Plan of Universal Education (1832). A fragment of a volume, Letters on a hitherto Undescribed Country, "written some years before but never published".

Frend, besides contributing two articles to Tracts on the Resolution of Affected Algebraick Equations, edited by Francis Maseres in 1800, and one tract to the same editor's Scriptores Logarithmici (vol. vi. 1807), suggested other matters to him in the same publications. Maseres in his Tracts on the Resolution of Cubick and Biquadratick Equations, published supplements to his appendix to Frend's Principles of Algebra.

== See also ==
- Penny Post

== Notes and references ==
- Rouse Ball, W. W. (2009) [1889]. A History of the Study of Mathematics at Cambridge University. Cambridge University Press. p. 109. ISBN 978-1-108-00207-3.
- Knight, Frida (1971). University Rebel, the Life of William Frend (1757–1841). London: Victor Gollancz. ISBN 0-575-00633-1.
- Richards, Joan L. (2021). Generations of Reason: A Family's Search for Meaning in Post-Newtonian England. Yale University Press. doi:10.12987/yale/9780300255492.001.0001. ISBN 978-0-300-25549-2.
- Liebeschuetz, Wolfgang (2007). "William Hugh Clifford Frend 1916–2005" (PDF). Proceedings of the British Academy. 150. British Academy: 37–54.
