= Mary De Morgan =

English writer

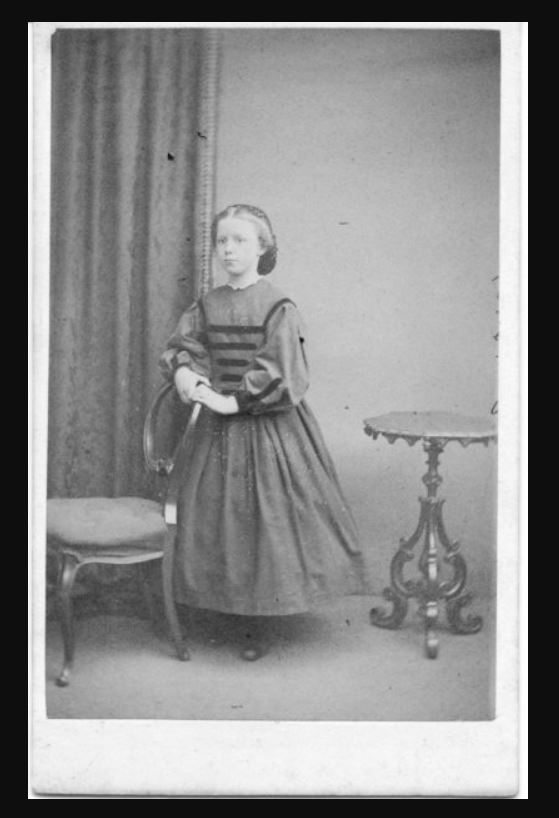
- Mary De Morgan as a child
- Born: 24 February 1850; London, England
- Died: 18 May 1907; Cairo, Egypt
- Occupations: Writer, typist
- Relatives: Augustus De Morgan (father), Sophia Elizabeth Frend (mother), William De Morgan (brother)
- Writing career
- Genre: Fairytales
- Notable works: On a Pincushion, The Necklace of Princess Fiorimonde, The Windfairies

Mary Augusta De Morgan (24 February 1850 – 18 May 1907) was an English writer and the author of three volumes of fairy-tales: On a Pincushion (1877); The Necklace of Princess Fiorimonde (1880); and The Windfairies (1900). She was also a suffragist, storyteller and educator.

== Early life and family ==
Mary Augusta De Morgan was born on 24 February 1850 in 7 Camden Street, London, England. She was the youngest child of the seven children of mathematician and logician Augustus De Morgan and his wife, spiritualist writer, phrenologist and activist Sophia Elizabeth De Morgan (née Frend). When De Morgan was three years old, her elder sister Alice died from measles at the age of 15, drawing her mother to spiritualism.

In her youth, De Morgan earned herself a reputation for tactlessness, apparently at one point telling Henry Holiday, "All artists are fools! Look at yourself and Mr. Solomon!" Mrs. Poynter, wife of the artist Edward Poynter, wrote in a letter to her sister Alice that De Morgan, "chattered awfully, and Louie, she is only just fifteen. I believe a judicious course of snubbing would do her good!" De Morgan also apparently said something to offend a young Bernard Shaw who, according to Lancelyn Green, "hated her exceedingly".

Following her father's death in 1871, De Morgan resided with her brother William in his Chelsea home on Kensington Church Street, until his marriage in 1887, after which she lived in lodgings while making a living as a typist. Her brother was a member of the arts and crafts movement and she and De Morgan were close friends with many literary figures, novelists and artists of the day. Mostly during her time living with her brother William, De Morgan told stories to her own nephews and nieces, as well as to the children of these friends and family: Jenny Morris and May Morris, children of William Morris; a young Rudyard Kipling and his sister "Trix", as well as their cousins, the Burne-Joneses and the Mackails. Angela Thirkell (née Mackail), and her brother, Denis Mackail, both novelists in adulthood, were treated to the stories of De Morgan in their youth. William Morris was fond of her stories, and when he was dying from tuberculosis in 1896, Mary came to nurse him.

== Writing ==
De Morgan's first publication was Six by Two: Stories of Old Schoolfellows (1873), a collection of stories co-authored with her friend, Edith Helen Dixon.

As an author of literary fairytales, De Morgan's works were heavily influenced by Hans Christian Andersen. They deviate from the fairy-tale norm, often not including a happy ending, or not having the protagonist gain wealth or power (rather procuring the wisdom of recognising the value of living without these things); and in the satirical element of political comment in her works. According to the Greenwood Encyclopedia of Folk Tales and Fairy Tales, the fairy-tales of De Morgan played a "comprehensive and central role" in her era in the evolution of the literary fairy-tale.

=== Collections of fairy-tales ===
==== On a Pincushion and other Tales (1877) ====
In the collection On a Pincushion, the first three stories are held within a frame story in which a brooch, a shawl-pin and a pin on a pincushion are telling each other tales to pass the time. This anthropomorphism of inanimate objects has been likened to the technique used by Hans Christian Andersen in many of his tales. The collection includes The Story of Vain Lamorna; The Seeds of Love; The Story of the Opal; Siegfried and Handa; The Hair Tree; The Toy Princess and Through The Fire. The volume was positively reviewed by The Burlington Magazine, who called it a "volume of witty and imaginative fairy-tales."

De Morgan's brother, the potter, tile designer and novelist William De Morgan, illustrated her first volume with Pre-Raphaelite style woodcuts.

A story from this collection, The Toy Princess, was featured on the BBC children's TV show Jackanory in 1966, and the same story featured on Jackanory Playhouse in 1981.

==== The Necklace of Princess Fiorimonde (1880) ====
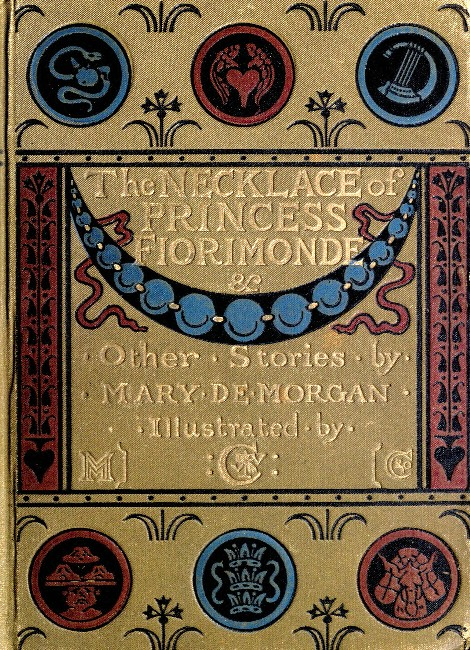
Book cover

De Morgan's second collection includes The Necklace of Princess Fiorimonde; The Wanderings of Arasmon; The Heart of Princess Joan; The Pedlar's Pack; The Bread of Discontent; The Three Clever Kings and The Wise Princess. This volume was illustrated by Walter Crane.

==== The Windfairies (1900) ====
De Morgan's third collection includes The Windfairies; Vain Kesta; The Pool and the Tree; Nanina's Sheep; The Gipsy's Cup; The Story of a Cat; Dumb Othmar; The Rain Maiden and The Ploughman and the Gnome. The Windfairies was her last collection of fairy-tales, and was illustrated by English artist Olive Cockerell.

In 1963, the three volumes were published together in the collection The Necklace of Princess Fiorimonde – The Complete Fairy Stories of Mary De Morgan, published by Victor Gollancz Ltd., with an introduction by biographer and children's writer Roger Lancelyn Green.

==== Articles ====
Alongside her fairy-tales, De Morgan also wrote articles for American periodicals on topics such as the English trade unionist movement and socialism, education in Victorian England and the Jewish community in East London.

== Politics ==
In 1890, De Morgan became a member of the women's suffragist group the Women's Franchise League (WFL). De Morgan's political views are reflected in her fairy-tales, which often had strong female protagonists. In The Toy Princess, a fairy godmother replaces a princess with a toy, who is submissive, says exactly what is expected of her and never laughs. Once the real princess has grown up the fairy godmother takes her back to the court, who unsurprisingly decide to keep the toy, so scared are they of a real woman, who shouts, laughs and cries and has a mind of her own.

Renowned socialist and textile artist William Morris was a close family friend of the De Morgans. Mary told some of her stories to his children, and it has been suggested that his politics influenced her writings: she ridicules mass-production in "Siegfried and Handa" and "The Bread of Discontent", both of which show beings of evil intent behind a community's turn from well-made, hand-crafted goods to poor-quality mass-produced goods, with disastrous consequences. This has been interpreted as a criticism of capitalism.

De Morgan's stories also often contain the theme of wealth and power being shown to be negative attributes – an attitude which resonates with her remark quoted in Roger Lancelyn Green's introduction to her work: "I am so thankful I have only a small income – it is so delightful planning things and deciding what one can afford. It would bore me to death to be rich!" Green also indicated that De Morgan's stories and their messages were aimed at a duel audience of both children and adults.

== Death ==
De Morgan died of tuberculosis in Cairo, Egypt, in 1907. She had moved there for the sake of her health, and taken charge of a reform school for girls in Helwan (or Helouan).
