= The Wise Princess =

- Short story by Mary De Morgan
- Country: Britain
- Language: English
- Genre: Literary fairy tale

Publication
- Published in: "The Tale of Princess Fiorimonde and Other Stories"
- Publisher: Macmillan and Co.
- Media type: Electronic
- Publication date: 1886

"The Wise Princess” is a British fairy tale about a princess who knows everything, except for true happiness. It was written in the second half of the nineteenth century by Mary De Morgan. The tale first appeared in “The Tale of Princess Fiorimonde and Other Stories” along with six other tales, published by Macmillan and Co. in 1886.

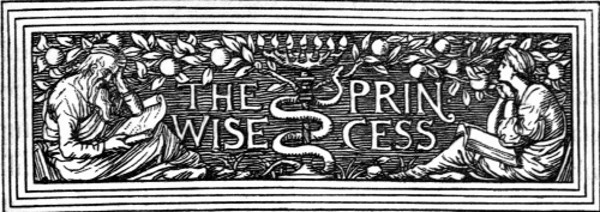
The title of Mary de Morgans "The Wise Princess" literary tale.

== Summary ==
The tale begins with the death of the King's wife, leaving the Princess Fernanda without a mother. While growing up, the child was so inquisitive that she was deemed the “Wise Princess," although she was scolded by the ladies for wanting to know too much.

As the years went on, the Princess yearned to learn as much as she could; She went through many masters and mistresses, but it was never enough. She wanted to know more. One day, she ventured to a dark cave where she met a wise wizard who agreed to teach the princess everything he knew. The wizard warned Fernanda that she would not find happiness from his teachings. Nonetheless in three years time she had learned all the wizard could teach her.

The princess became so wise she could identify any animal and speak any language. Soon she grew very weary and sick. Her father sent for the doctor but Princess Fernanda stopped him, for she knew more than he.

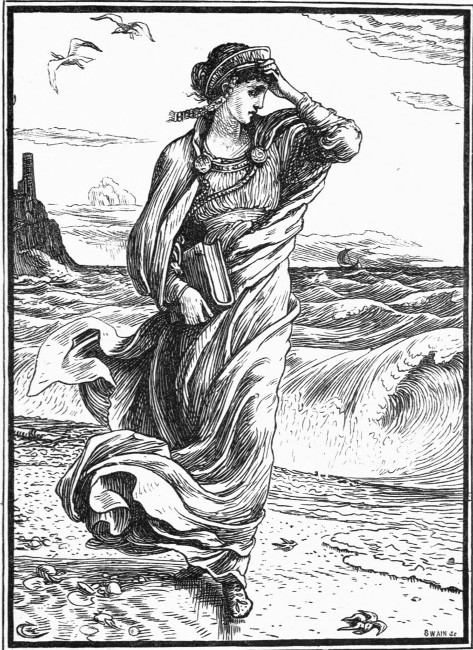
Illustration from the literary fairy tale "The Wise Princess" By Mary de Morgan

One day, Fernanda wandered by the sea and came across a bird and a dog, both of whom appeared to be happy. When the Princess asked them what made them happy, she was not satisfied with their answers, such as, “The sky is so blue, and the fields are so green” and “plenty to eat, and a soft cushion to rest upon”. When the Princess arrived home, still distraught, she asked Doris, her favourite maid why she was so happy. Even the maid couldn’t help Princess Fernanda.

Princess Fernanda continued on her walk and came upon a church where a wounded soldier smiled while laying in his coffin. The Princess also saw Death in the church and asked him to teach her to smile like the young man. Death also could not teach the Wise Princess happiness.

Further along the walk, by the seashore, the Wise Princess saw a child drowning. She jumped in the water and saved the child, but the waves were too high to save herself. Death came to see her and said “I will teach you all you want to know”.

After the princess died, The King's servants found her body by the shore with a smile on her face. The people cried while the Wizard commended the princess for having achieved happiness, making her the most wise of them all.

== Cultural impact ==
Mary De Morgan was known for addressing many political issues in her Fairy Tales, particularly feminism. James Fowler makes note in De Morgan’s book, The Necklace of Fiorimonde, of De Morgan’s intention of keeping the female characters dynamic. In “The Wise Princess” Fowler denotes the female character as a variation from the more commonly known folklore princess. De Morgan creates a “dynamic title character” embedded with self-important qualities. He also notes that De Morgan “depicts men and women alike”, with qualities of fearlessness and intelligence combined with opposing qualities of irrationality.

From her childhood, when she was described as “downright and determined,” to her adulthood, when she became known as a “talented woman”, De Morgan represented a counterpoint to most Victorian stereotypes of femininity. “Garrulous and competent,” she was immersed in the activities of friends and family, who were stout progressives. As Marilyn Pemberton notes, De Morgan was capable of introducing “serious social and political issue[s] into fairyland”, and her tales display a tendency to critique “faulty or unsustainable economies”. Pemberton and Fowler note that her tales critique unfair labour practices and the consumption of mass-produced goods.

== External sources ==
- The Wise Princess by Mary de Morgan
