= Children's Friend Society =

British juvenile-emigration organisation

The Children's Friend Society for "the Prevention of Juvenile Vagrancy" through the reformation and emigration of children, was founded in London in 1830, by Captain Edward Pelham Brenton, together with or supported by wealthy philanthropists, and with cooperation from the government of the United Kingdom. Brenton's 1837 book, The Bible and Spade, sets out the background and objectives, citing histories and correspondence pertaining to the society's activities.

The Society's principal aim was "to reclaim and provide for vagrant children found in the streets without any means of subsistence except by begging or thieving..." Such children were sent out to British colonies including the Cape of Good Hope (South Africa), Canada, Mauritius and Australia.

In 1832 groups of children were sent to the Cape Colony in South Africa and to the Swan River Colony in Australia, while in the following years 230 children were shipped to Toronto and New Brunswick, Canada.

A related child migration scheme was founded by Annie MacPherson in 1869, under which more than 100 000 so-called Home Children were sent from the United Kingdom to Australia, Canada, New Zealand, and South Africa.
