= Gatacre =

Gatacre may refer to:

- Galfry Gatacre or Gataker (1907–1983), Australian naval officer
- Thomas Gatacre, 16th-century English politician and cleric
- William Gatacre (MP) (died 1577), English politician
- William Forbes Gatacre (1843–1906), British soldier in India

== See also ==
- Gateacre
