= Kirribilli Neighbourhood Centre =

Venue in Sydney, Australia

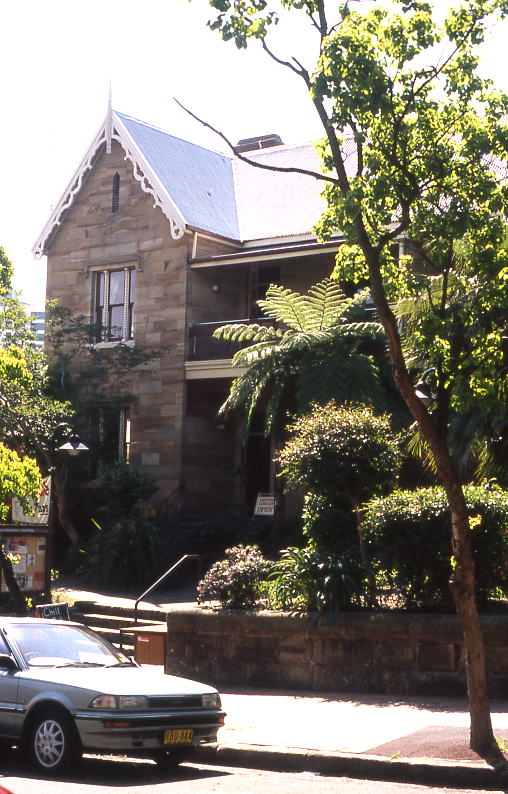
Kirribilli Neighbourhood Centre

The Kirribilli Neighbourhood Centre occupies two restored old stone houses, known as 16 and 18 Fitzroy Street at the northern end of Jeffrey Street, Kirribilli. The houses were built by Henry Hocken Bligh in 1875-1876. Bligh was born on 19 October 1826 in Bodmin, Cornwall England and died at his home on 30 July 1904. The houses were acquired by North Sydney Council in 1974 and the modern day Kirribilli Neighbourhood Centre opened in 1976.

The Kirribilli Neighbourhood Centre is now run as a community neighbourhood centre by a committee governed by the North Sydney Council. The centre provides spaces for community activities and parties or celebrations. The Kirribilli Neighbourhood Centre Committee also manages the Kirribilli General Markets, the Art and Design Market and the Fashion Market.

== History ==
The land on which they were built was a portion of a larger area of which James Milson had been granted permissive occupancy in 1824, but which was later successfully claimed as part of Robert Ryan's 120-acre (0.49 km^{2}) grant of 26 April 1800. In turn, the land passed to Robert Campbell (1769–1846), and then to Arthur Jeffreys by a deed of partition on 15 April 1848, and a conveyance on 28 February 1854. Over the years Jeffreys leased and sold parcels of his land. On the 29 April 1873, Henry Hocken Bligh (1826–1904) and Neil Stewart bought from Jeffreys the land on which now stands the Kirribilli Neighbourhood Centre. Bligh had been the mayor of Willoughby in 1869 and 1871.

Bligh and Stewart acquired what was called Lot 2 which was on the northern side of Fitzroy Street with an approximate frontage of 166 feet (51 m), and a depth of 138 feet (42 m) to a 30-foot (9.1 m) reserved roadway now known as Bligh Street. On the west it was separated by a fence from Lot 1 which was the lot that occupied the corner of Fitzroy Street and Broughton Street. Lot 1 was already being leased by Henry Hocken Bligh who lived in a wooden house on the Lot until his new house was complete.

Research into the early Rate Books of East St Leonards Council by Marjory Byrne of the North Sydney Historical Society in 1978 shows that the two stone houses were built by Bligh in 1875-1876. They were described at the time as two storey, stone with slate roof, and of eight rooms each. The 1875-76 records show that one of the stone houses was occupied by Mr. Bligh, and the other by Mrs Want. Mr. Bligh's home became No. 16 and the other No. 18 Fitzroy Street. The Rate Books record that the houses were initially stated to be in North Sydney, subsequently Milsons Point, and later still, Kirribilli. Mr. Bligh occupied the house, which he named "Trelawney" until his death in 1904. Hocken is buried in the heritage cemetery at St Thomas' Cemetery, North Sydney, NSW.

On his death his share of the whole property passed to his sons, Henry Albury Bligh (b: Bef. 22 Sep 1862 in Albury, NSW, Australia d: Bef. 15 Sep 1928 in Wyong, NSW) and William Milson Bligh (b: 1867 in St Leonards, Sydney, NSW, Australia d: 1936 in North Sydney, NSW). His widow, and members of the family are thought to have remained in the house until about 1905. His widow, Mrs. Bligh died at "Carabella", 34 McDougall Street Kirribilli on 28 August 1927.

Some of the occupants of No 18 Fitzroy Street were:

- Mrs Want (from 1876–77)
- A.C. Rudge (from 1878–79) (barely readable)
- Hayley Marshall (c. 1881) (barely readable)
- Alexander Thompson (from 1884–93)
- Rev. Rice (from 1895–99) (barely readable)

In December 1911 the two houses (No. 16 and 18 Fitzroy Street) were bought by Margaret Cullen, wife of Thomas Cullen, retired victualler of North Sydney for £2,300.00. The Cullen family held the properties until 9 March 1951 when they were purchased by Domenico and Mary Re.

On 31 January 1961 the property was purchased by Granula Court Pty. Ltd. Subsequently, in 1974, vacant and neglected the property was purchased by North Sydney Council on 4 July 1974.

== Construction and heritage listing ==
The house has been largely restored to the original layout with relatively minor alterations.

The Kirribilli Neighbourhood Centre is heritage-listed on the Register of the National Estate.

The building is described on the NSW heritage database as being "designed in the Victorian Rustic Gothic style". The "Two storey symmetrical semi-detached houses of stone with a corrugated iron gabled roof. There are carved bargeboards, finials and a lancet ventillator to the gable ends, three-light square-headed windows and iron lace, columns and balustrades to the verandahs." And as being "Built 1876 for Henry Hocken Bligh (1826-1904), former Mayor of Willoughby (1869-70) and husband of Elizabeth Shairp, granddaughter of James Milson. The Blighs lived at No. 16 and owned other properties in the area. It was sold in 1911, through various ownerships until acquired by the Council in 1974. It was restored subsequently as the Kirribilli Neighbourhood Centre."

North Sydney Council in more recent documentation has referred to the centre as "Rustic Gothic" Victorian architecture.

== Modern usage as a Neighbourhood Centre ==
The establishment of the Kirribilli Neighbourhood Centre was initiated by Alderman Robyn Read Hamilton who had money set aside in the Council estimates and drove the project. An open day was held on 28 September 1974 at the unrestored centre. The public were invited to view the centre and make suggestions as to how the building could be used. A Committee was formed which has operated continuously since that time as a Limited Cooperative. The Centre was opened in May 1976.

The Kirribilli Neighbourhood Centre is now run as a community neighbourhood centre by a committee governed by the North Sydney Council. The centre provides spaces for community activities and parties or celebrations. It also provides a wide range of adult education courses, holds a monthly market, and offers activities and services for all ages. Rooms with views of the Sydney Opera House and the Sydney Harbour Bridge are available for hire.

The Centre is commonly used as a meeting place for organisations including:

- Sydney Unitarians
- Sydney Seniors
- Adults Surviving Child Abuse
- Storytelling

The Centre also features a large outdoor area with a large toy collection for children.

The Kirribilli Neighbourhood Centre Committee also manages the Kirribilli General Markets, the Art and Design Market and the Fashion Market.
