= Kirribilli =

- Suburb
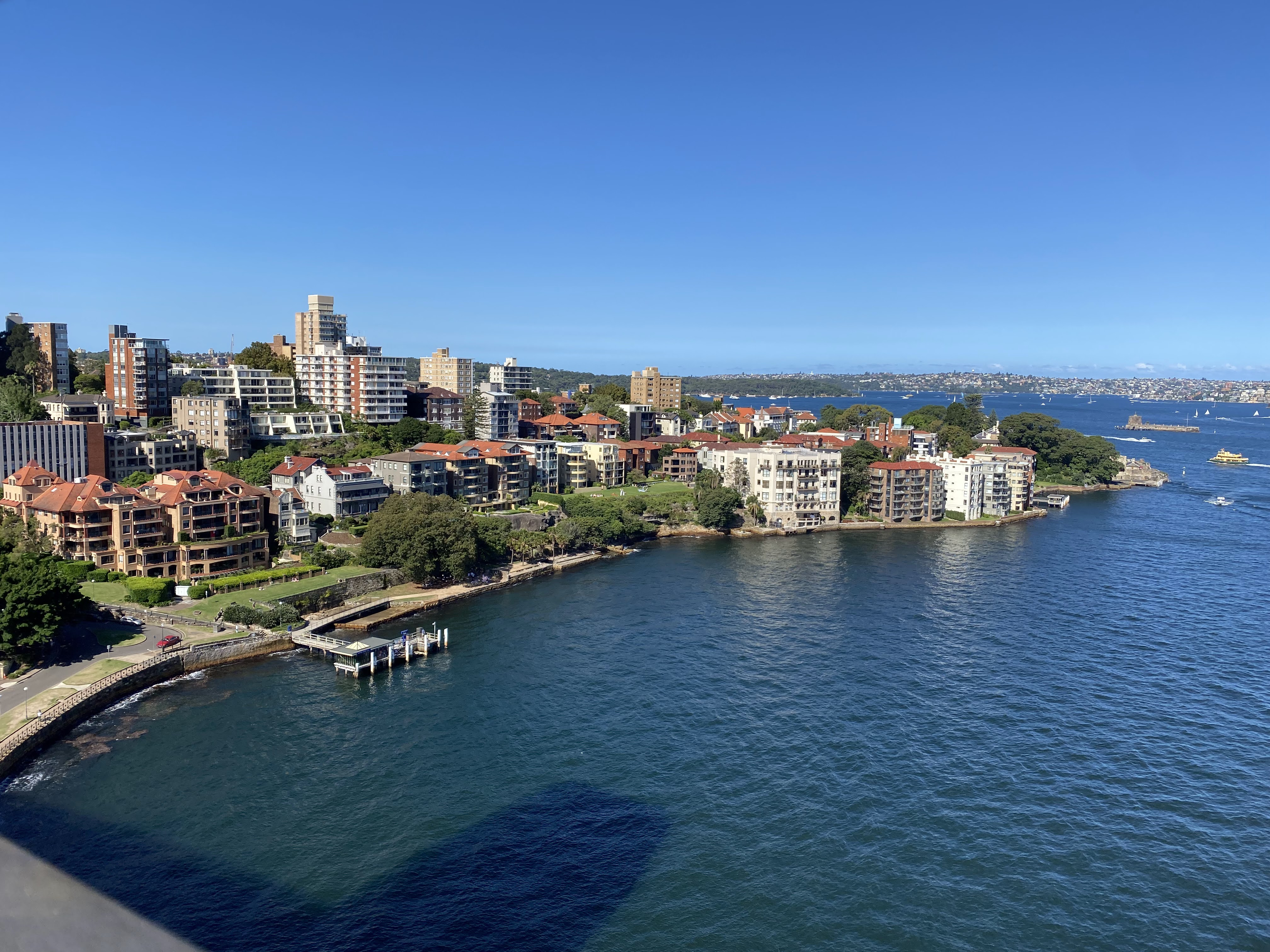
- Kirribilli from the Sydney Harbour Bridge

- Interactive map of Kirribilli
- Country: Australia
- State: New South Wales
- City: Sydney
- LGA: North Sydney Council
- Location: 3 km (1.9 mi) north of Sydney CBD

Government
  - State electorate: North Shore
  - Federal division: Warringah

Area
  - Total: 0.5 km^{2} (0.19 sq mi)

Population
  - Total: 3,629 (2021 census)
  - Density: 7,300/km^{2} (18,800/sq mi)
- Postcode: 2061
Suburbs around Kirribilli
Milsons Point	North Sydney	Neutral Bay
Milsons Point	Kirribilli
	The Rocks	Sydney CBD

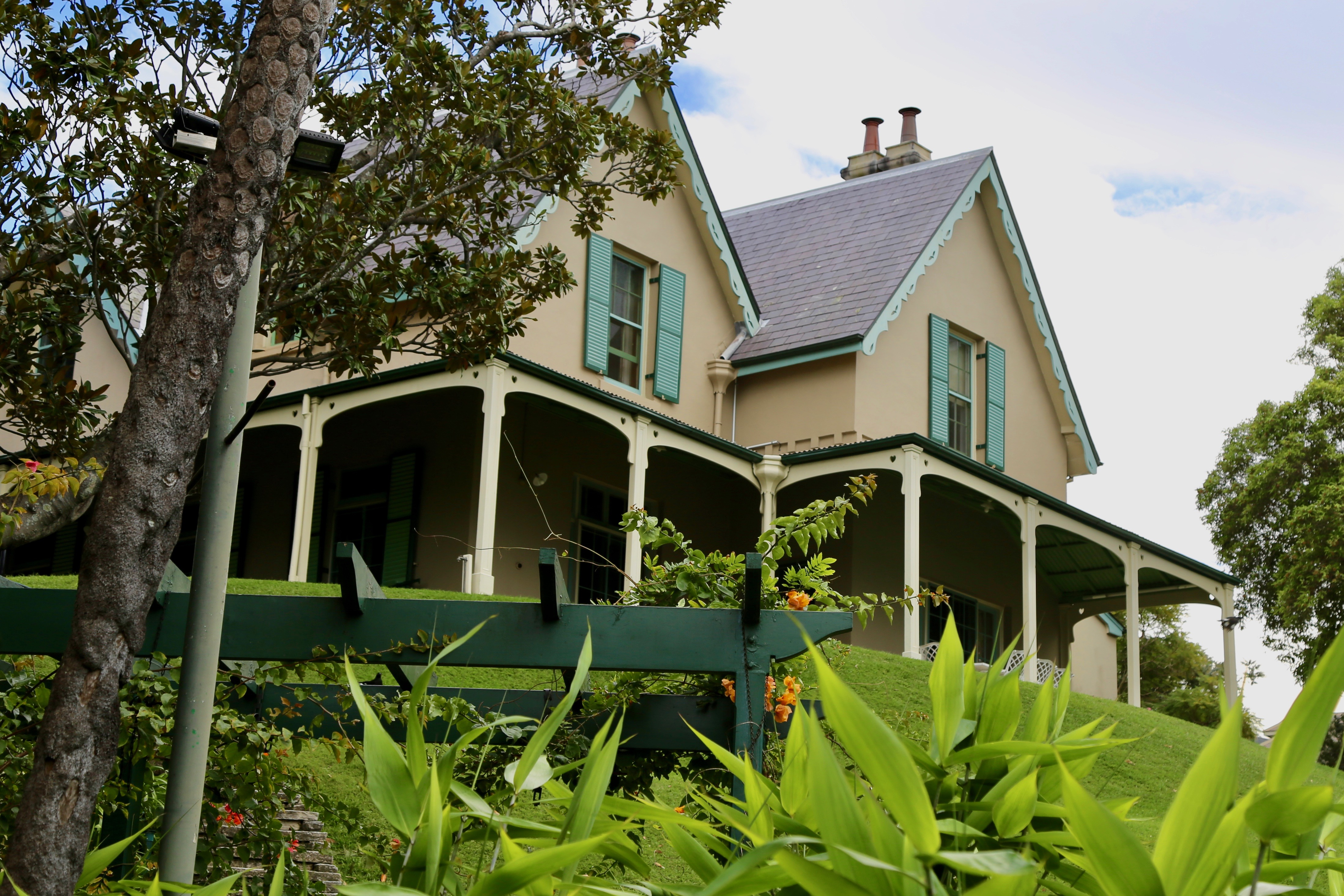
Kirribilli House

Kirribilli is a suburb on the Lower North Shore of Sydney, New South Wales, Australia. One of the city's most established and affluent neighbourhoods, it is located three kilometres north of the Sydney central business district, in the local government area administered by North Sydney Council, and sits on Sydney Harbour. Kirribilli House is one of the two official residences of the Prime Minister of Australia.

== History ==
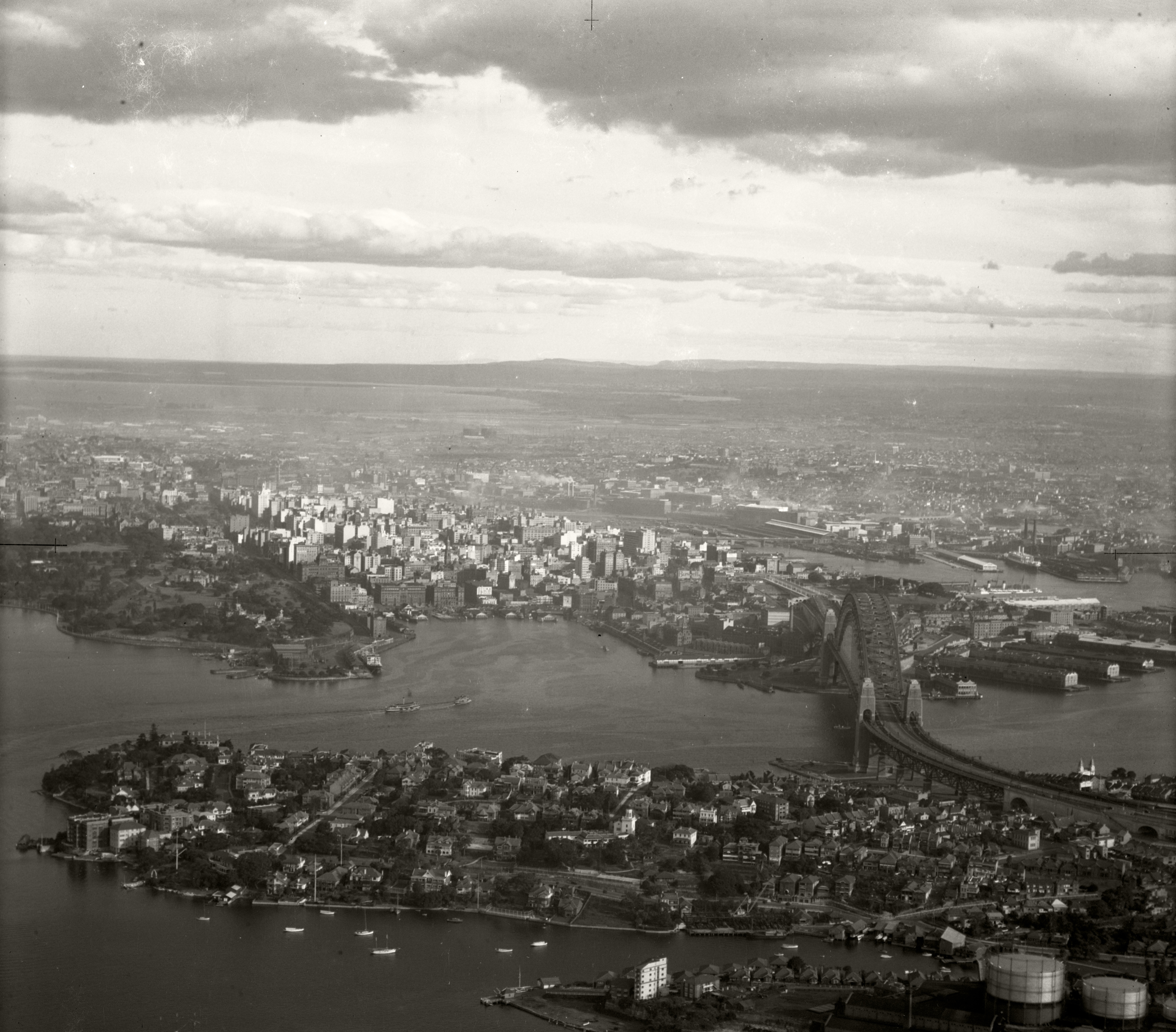
The Sydney city centre behind Kirribilli in 1937. The two regions were linked by the opening Harbour Bridge.

The name Kirribilli is derived from an Aboriginal word Kiarabilli, which means 'good fishing spot'. Another theory suggests that Kirribilli is an adaptation of 'Carabella', the name given by early colonist James Milson to his first house.

Prominent early landowners in Kirribilli included members of the Campbell, Jeffrey and Gibbes families. Colonel John George Nathaniel Gibbes (1787–1873), the Collector of Customs for New South Wales, built 'Wotonga' - the forerunner of Admiralty House - in 1842–43 on a 5-acre (20,000 m^{2}) site which he leased, and then purchased, from the Campbells. Gibbes' son, William John Gibbes, lived nearby in Beulah House during the 1840s. Beulah was later lived in by the Riley and Lasseter families. Eventually, the house was demolished and its grounds subdivided into numerous residential blocks which were put up for public auction in 1905.

Although Kirribilli is a predominantly residential area today, from 1890 to 1921, the Pastoral Finance Association had a large wool warehouse, meat cold store and wharf, on the foreshore adjacent to Admiralty House. The seven-storey building was destroyed by fire in December 1921, along with 30,000 bales of wool. Its engine room, which survived the fire, supplied electricity to customers on the north side of the harbour, until around 1922. The land was sold off in 19 allotments, in 1925, and later redeveloped as blocks of apartments.

== Population ==
In the 2021 Census, there were 3,629 people in Kirribilli. 53.7% of people were born in Australia. The most common other countries of birth were England 6.3% and China 3.1%. 72.3% of people only spoke English at home. The most common responses for religion were No Religion 40.0% and Catholic 21.5%. While the suburb is one of the more densely populated parts of Sydney, as of 2024 it was reported to have a very high number of inactive dwellings.

== Landmarks ==
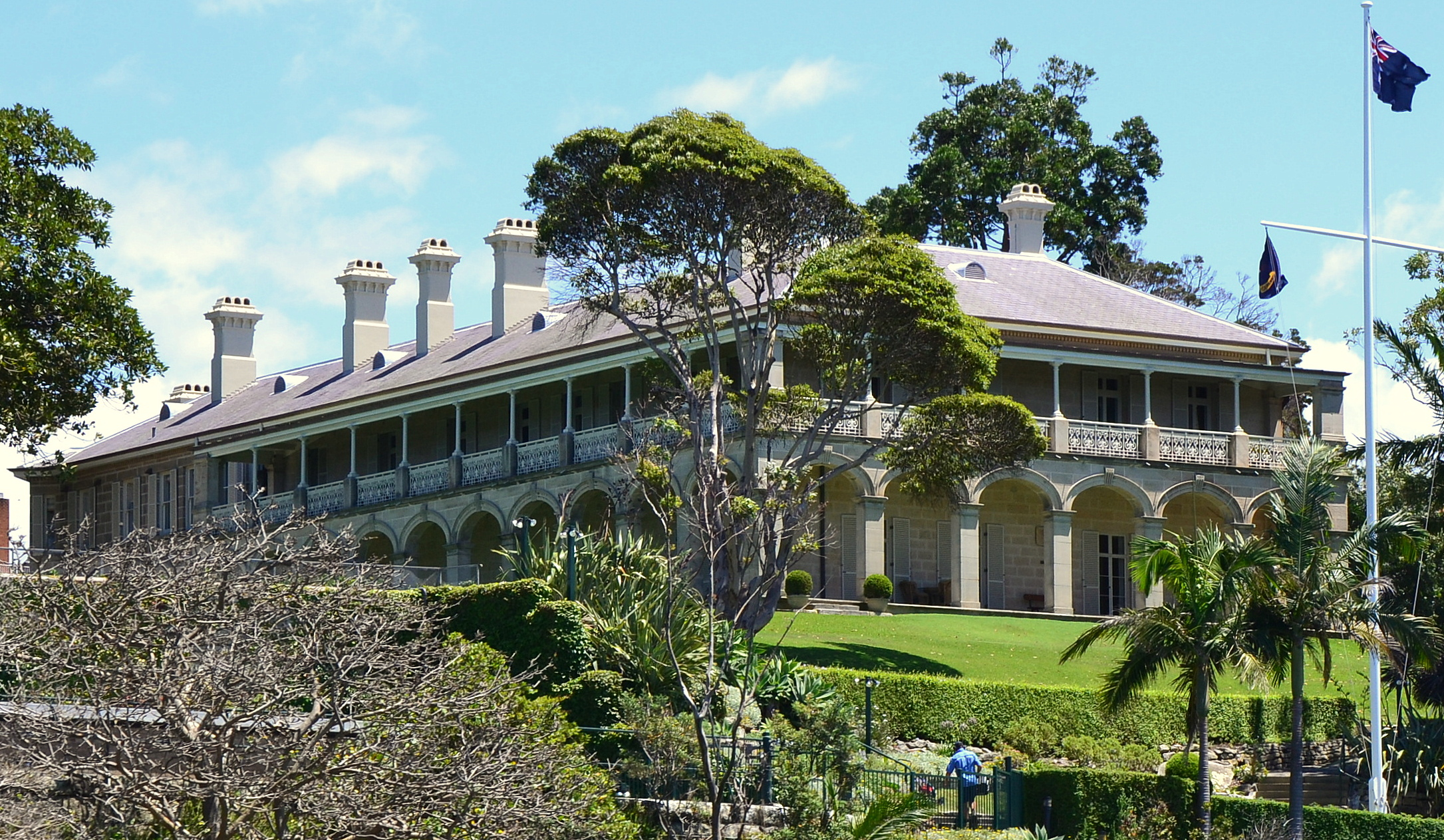
Admiralty House

Kirribilli is one of Australia's older suburbs, with the first land grants in the area being granted by the colonial government during the 1790s. A scattering of Georgian and Gothic-revival houses and mansions were built in the 1830s, '40s and '50s. Most of these have since been razed. Originally, Kirribilli formed part of the Parish of St Leonard's and was served by a private ferry service. In a process which began in the 1860s, the area's old estates were subdivided. New residential streets were laid out and terrace houses, Victorian villas and, later, blocks of apartments erected. During the early decades of the 20th century, Kirribilli's shoreline was dominated by a large, multi-storey brick warehouse which was eventually torn down to make way for housing.

The suburb contains Kirribilli House (the official Sydney residence of the Prime Minister of Australia), Admiralty House (the official Sydney residence of the Governor-General of Australia), and the headquarters and marina of the Royal Sydney Yacht Squadron located on the former Carabella mansion. The Sydney headquarters of ASIO was formerly at 31 Carabella Street. The Sydney Flying Squadron is located adjoining Milson Park, formerly Kirribilli Park.

Admiralty House, originally a private dwelling belonging to Colonel John George Nathaniel Gibbes, is Kirribilli's oldest extant building, the earliest portions of which date to 1842. Kirribilli House was built next door by Adolphus Frederick Feez, a wealthy merchant, in 1854–55.

The following buildings are on the Register of the National Estate:

- St Aloysius' College, Upper Pitt Street
- St Aloysius' College's junior school (formerly Kirribilli Public School), Burton Street
- Loreto Convent (formerly Elamang), Carabella Street
- Kirribilli Neighbourhood Centre, Fitzroy Street
- Sunnyside (house and grounds), Holbrook Avenue
- Kirribilli House, Kirribilli Avenue
- Admiralty House and Lodge, Kirribilli Point
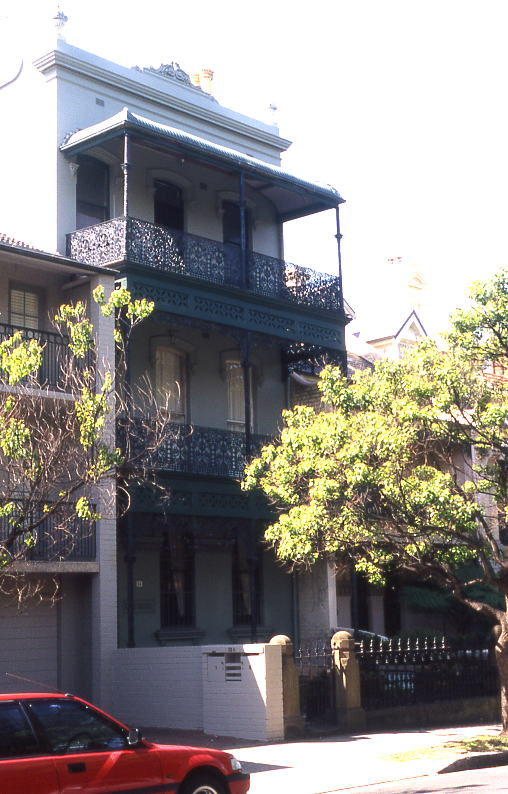
Karlsruhe, Fitzroy Street

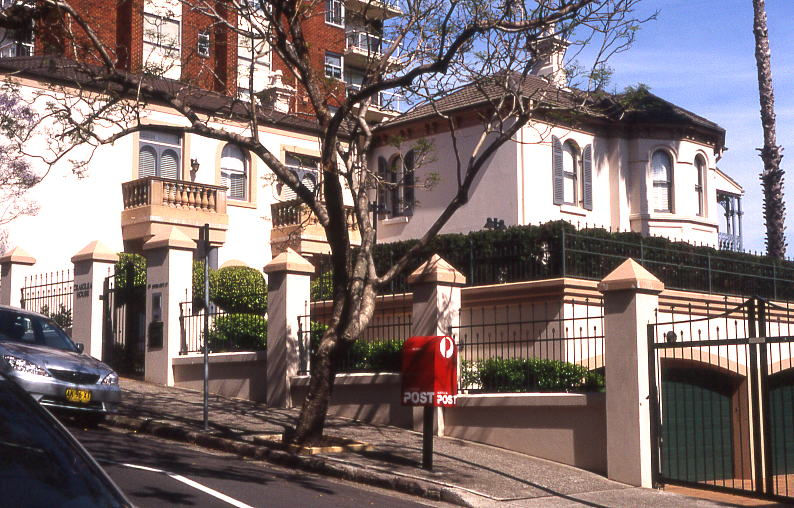
Craiglea House, Upper Pitt Street

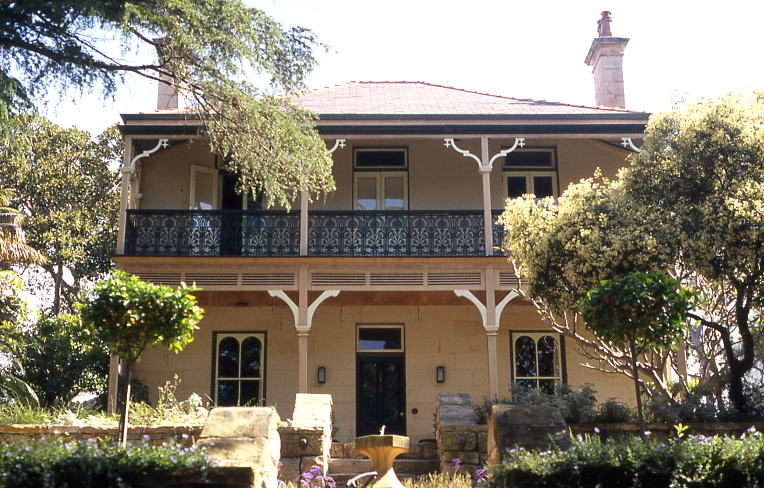
Burnleigh, Carabella Street

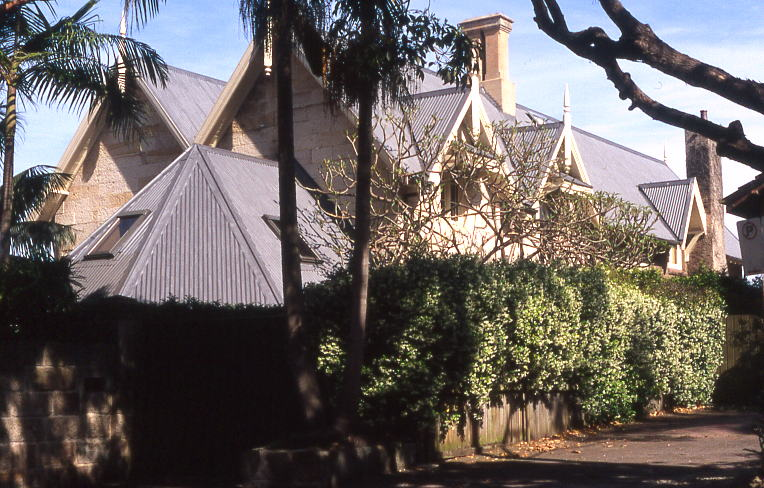
Sunnyside, Holbrook Avenue

== Transport ==
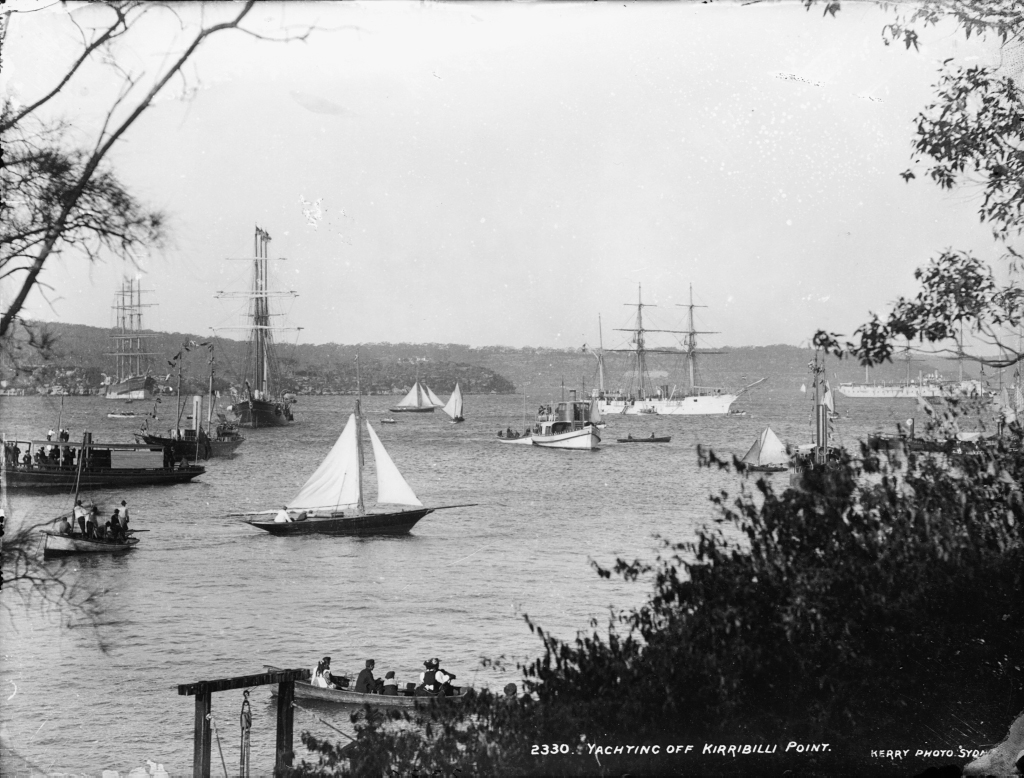
Yacht racing off Kirribilli Point, circa 1900

Kirribilli supports the northern end of the Sydney Harbour Bridge. The Warringah Freeway provides a link south to the Sydney CBD and north to Chatswood. Kirribilli is serviced by rail, bus and ferry services.

Milsons Point railway station is the closest railway station on the North Shore railway line of the Sydney Trains network. It is located next to the main shopping streets, and has frequent services to the Sydney CBD and the North Shore.

Busways operate regular services from Kirribilli to many parts of northern Sydney. The 269 bus service runs a loop within the Kirribilli - Milsons Point - McMahons Point - North Sydney railway station area on weekdays.

There are four operating ferry wharves near Kirribilli, serviced by both public and private ferries. They are:

- On the eastern side is Kirribilli wharf, part of the Sydney Ferries Neutral Bay service. The wharf is one stop from Circular Quay and has two services per hour in each direction. Kirribilli Wharf also has a small local cafe serving coffees, cakes, and newspapers to commuters and many local regulars.
- At the southernmost tip of Kirribilli is the Beulah Street Wharf. This small wharf was dropped from public Sydney Ferries services when an inner harbour ferry route was cancelled, though was briefly pressed into service between 7–13 February 2011 and again on 27–28 October 2012 while the main Kirribilli wharf was undergoing maintenance. In 2005, private operator Matilda Cruises started using Beulah Street Wharf as part of their Matilda Express loop from Circular Quay to Darling Harbour but it was suspended by 2006. Outside ferry hours, Beulah Street Wharf is frequently used for fishing and recreation and being directly north of the Sydney Opera House, offers spectacular harbour views.
- On the eastern side of the Sydney Harbour Bridge, Jeffreys Street Wharf is also no longer used by Sydney Ferries, with just a few services by Matilda Cruises. It is still used by private charter services, but is more popular as a fishing location. The panoramic views of the Opera House, Circular Quay, and the Harbour Bridge make Jeffrey Street a popular location for wedding photography.
- On the western side of the Bridge is Milsons Point ferry wharf, which carries many more services than the Kirribilli wharves and joins Kirribilli to the CBD, the inner harbour, and along the Parramatta River to Parramatta.

== Commercial area ==
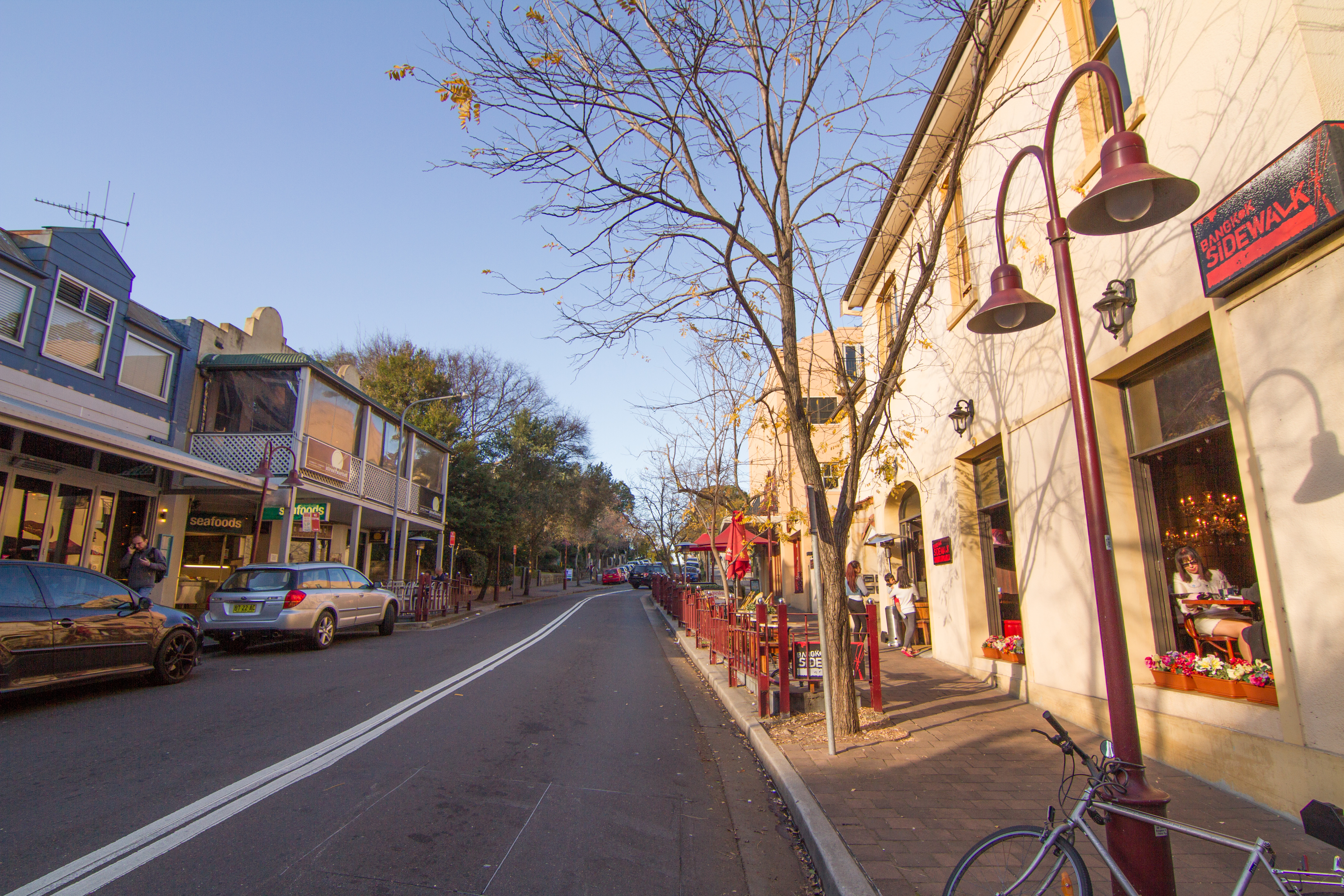
A commercial strip in Kirribilli

Kirribilli has a small shopping strip opposite Milsons Point railway station. The 'Kirribilli Markets' are held on the fourth Saturday of each month, on the lawns of the former Kirribilli Bowling Club. The markets contain a mixture of new and second-hand clothing, bric-a-brac, jewellery, and food-and-drink stands.

== Schools ==
The two main schools in the suburb are St Aloysius' College and Loreto Kirribilli.

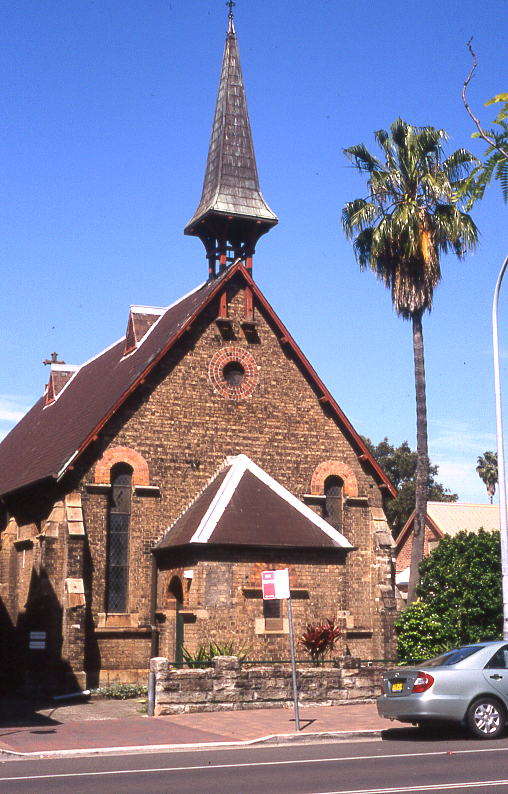
St John the Baptist's Anglican Church, Broughton Street

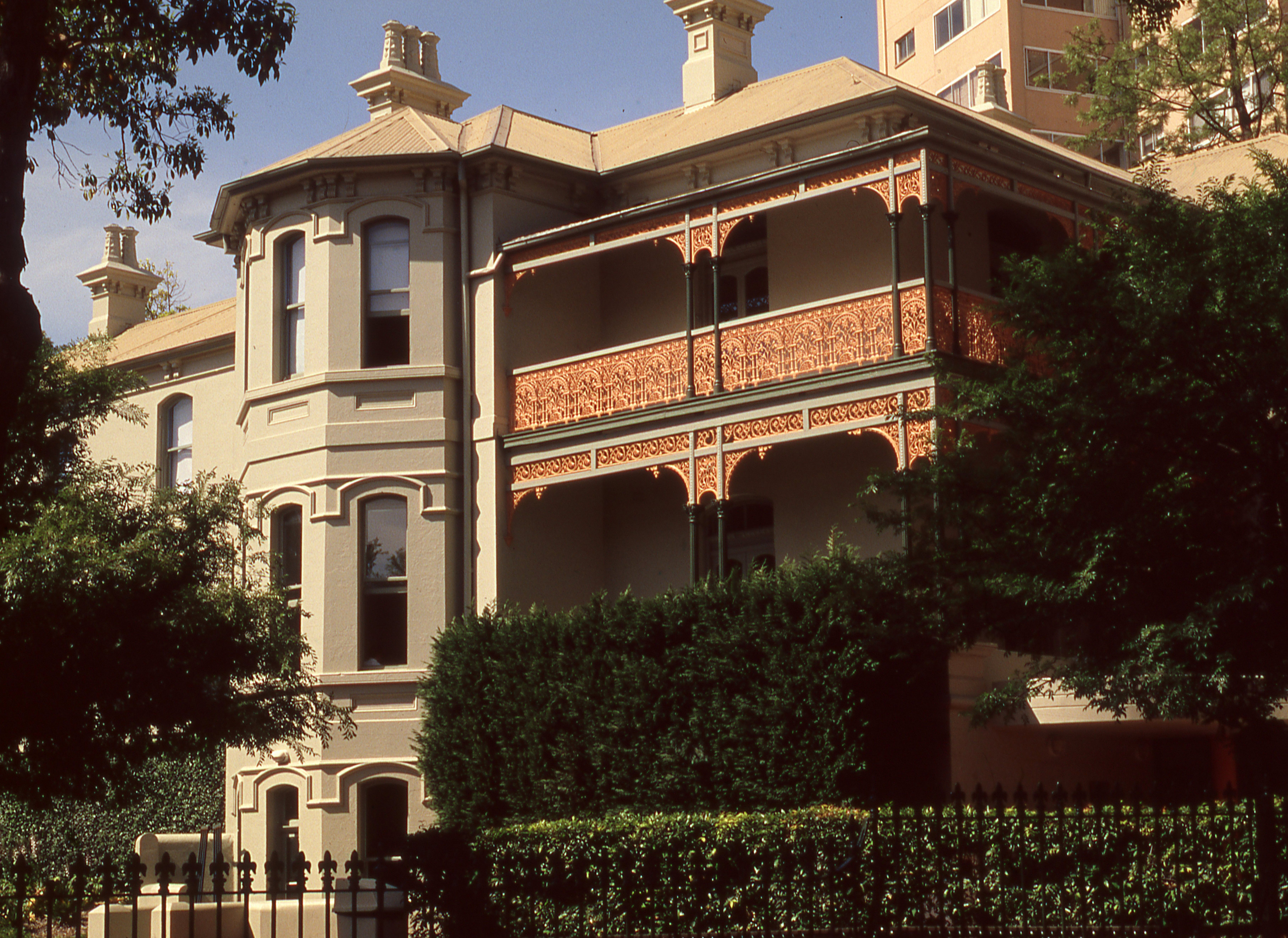
Senior School, St Aloysius College, Upper Pitt Street

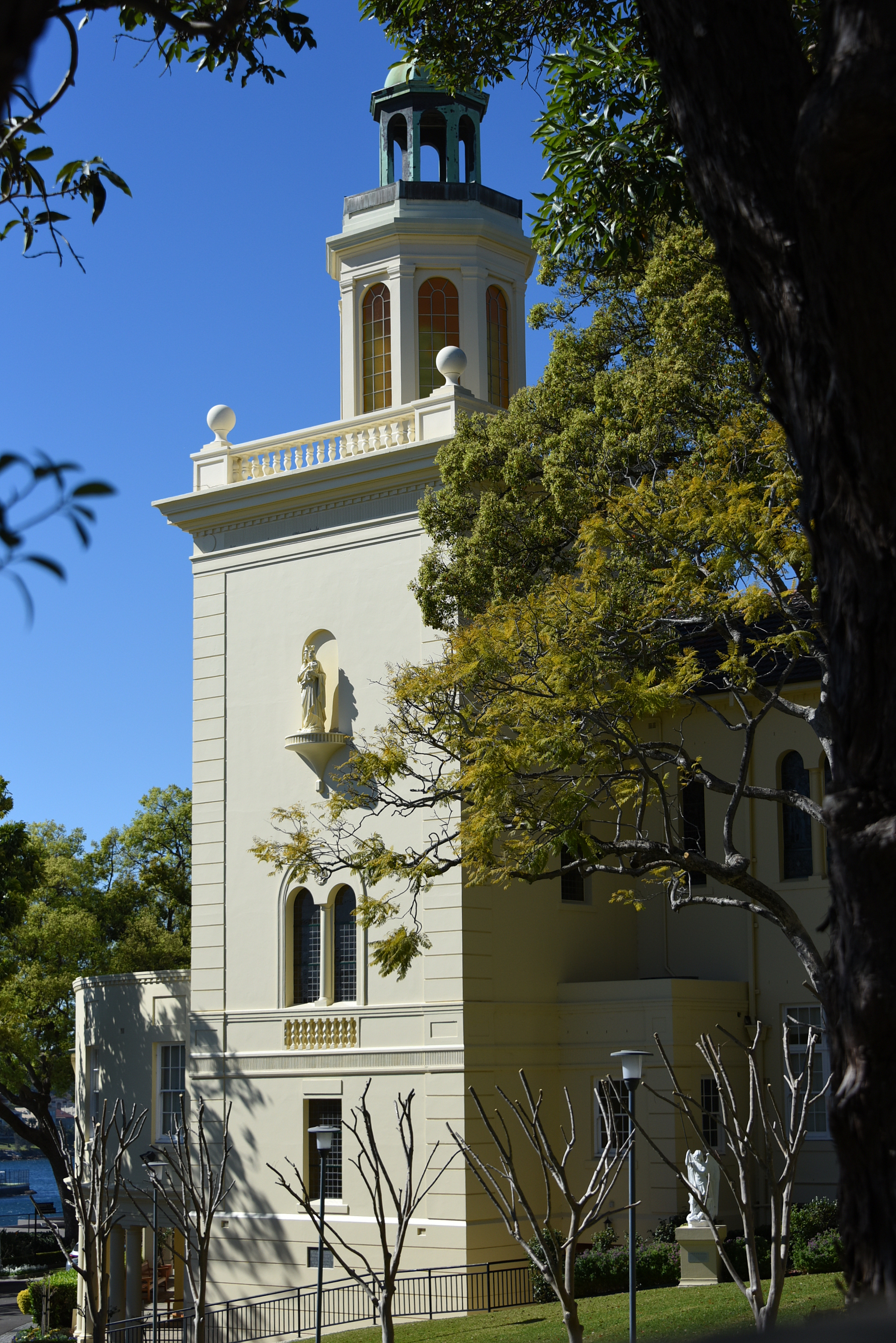
Loreto Kirribilli

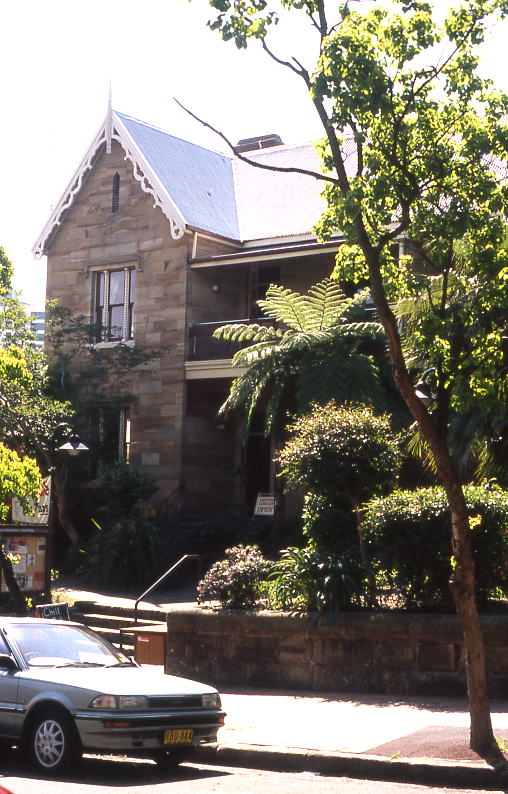
Kirribilli Neighbourhood Centre, Fitzroy Street

== Churches ==
- Our Lady Star of the Sea Catholic Church, part of North Sydney Parish
- St John's Anglican Church ("Church by the Bridge")

== Culture ==
Kirribilli is the home of Australia's oldest continuously operating professional theatre company, The Ensemble Theatre. Located in a converted boatshed, it shows productions of contemporary works by both Australian and International playwrights.

== People ==
- Elizabeth von Arnim (1866–1941), German-British novelist

== See also ==
Streets

- Jeffrey(s) Street

Landmark buildings, structures and heritage

- Kirribilli House
- Admiralty House
- Sydney Harbour Bridge
- Reserve Bank of Australia
- Kirribilli Neighbourhood Centre

Tourism, theatres and sport

- Royal Sydney Yacht Squadron
- Ensemble Theatre
- Sydney Flying Squadron

Other

- Kirribilli agreement
