= Jeffrey Street =

Street in Kirribilli, New South Wales, Australia

Jeffreys Street Jeffrey Street New South Wales
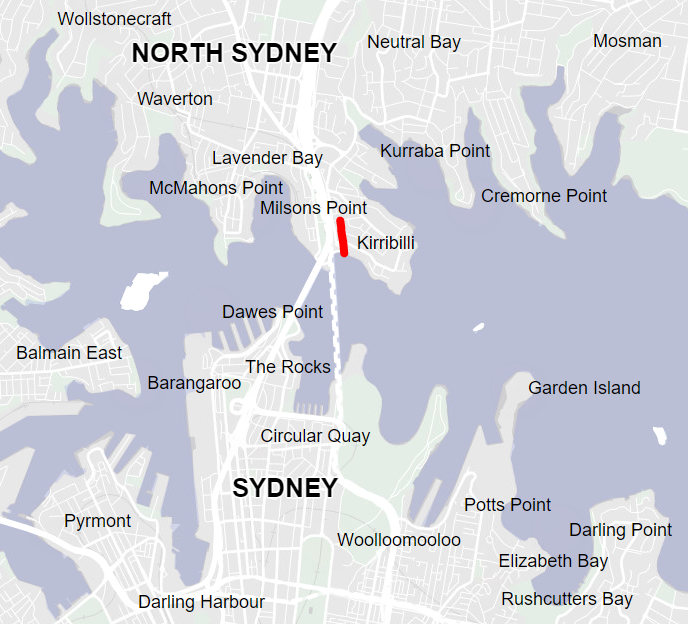
- Jeffrey Street, Kirribilli NSW
- Coordinates: 33°50′50.4″S 151°12′49.1″E; 33°50′59.0″S 151°12′50.3″E

General information
- Type: Street
- Location: Kirribilli
- Length: 300 m (1,000 ft)
- History: Conservation Area

Major junctions
- Fitzroy Street, Kirribilli
- Kirribilli Avenue

Location(s)
- LGA(s): North Sydney Council
- Major suburbs: Kirribilli

Restrictions
- General: Traffic and parking for major events

Jeffrey Street is a street located in Kirribilli, famous for being one of the most popular vantage points for views of the city skyline of Sydney, the Sydney Harbour Bridge and the Sydney Opera House. The street is located on the Lower North Shore of Sydney Harbour, directly across the harbour from Circular Quay and is a popular destination for tourists, particularly on Australia Day and New Year's Eve. The street leads uphill from the harbour in a northerly direction to the small shopping village of Kirribilli. For many years the area was called the North Shore and the original land grant changed hands a number of times. Over the past 200 years the area has also been called Huntershill, St Leonards, North Sydney, "Kiarabilli", Milsons Point and "Kirribilli Point". The modern spelling Kirribilli was first used in 1853 and the use of Kirribilli as a locality is more recent.

There are 19 listed heritage properties along the street, one of the highest concentrations of listed heritage properties in Australia. (Note: Exceeded only by Lower Fort Street in Millers Point at The Rocks) All but one of the original structures on the east side of the street have been demolished, only "Wyalla" remains. But the west side of Jeffrey Street is notable because it contains a row of 17 terrace houses that have remained virtually unchanged for over 100 years. This is the longest row remaining on Sydney's North Shore and the second longest row in Australia. Most of the other terrace houses in the area were demolished in order to construct the approaches to the Sydney Harbour Bridge.

North Sydney Council favours the spelling of the street as "Jeffreys" as this correctly renders the surname of a 19th-century local landowner, Arthur Jeffreys. However, a Thomas Jeffrey was also a prominent early Kirribilli resident and the Wharf bears his name. Furthermore, some records report that a John Jeffreys was an early resident. Almost all historical references refer to Jeffrey Street so the provenance or derivation of the street name is uncertain.

On 16 December 2011 the NSW Minister for Planning and Infrastructure gazetted an amendment to the North Sydney Council Local Environmental Plan (Amendment 47) which established a heritage conservation area called the Jeffreys Street Conservation Area.

== View and crowds ==
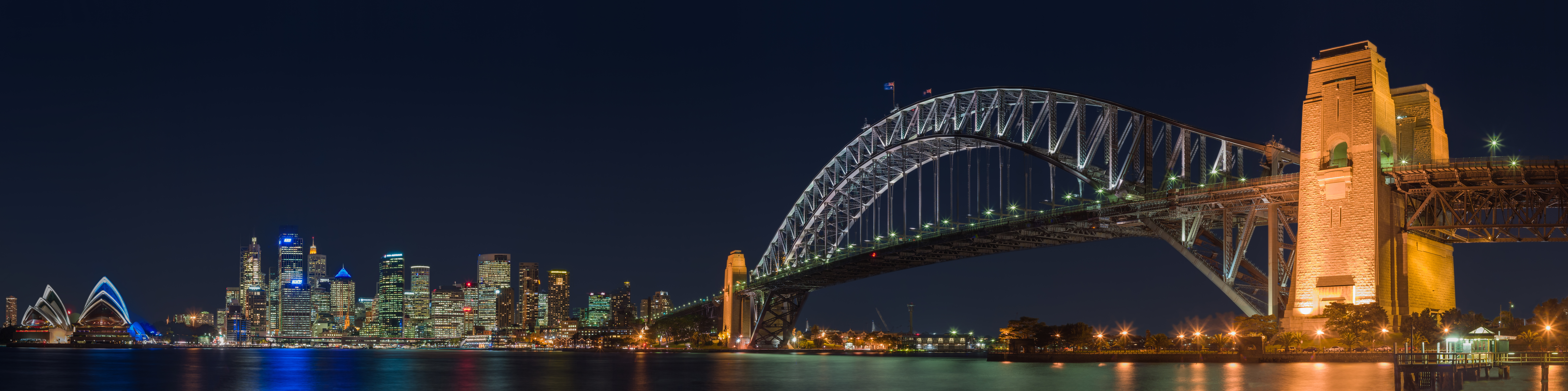
Panorama from Kirribilli with the Jeffrey Street wharf visible at right

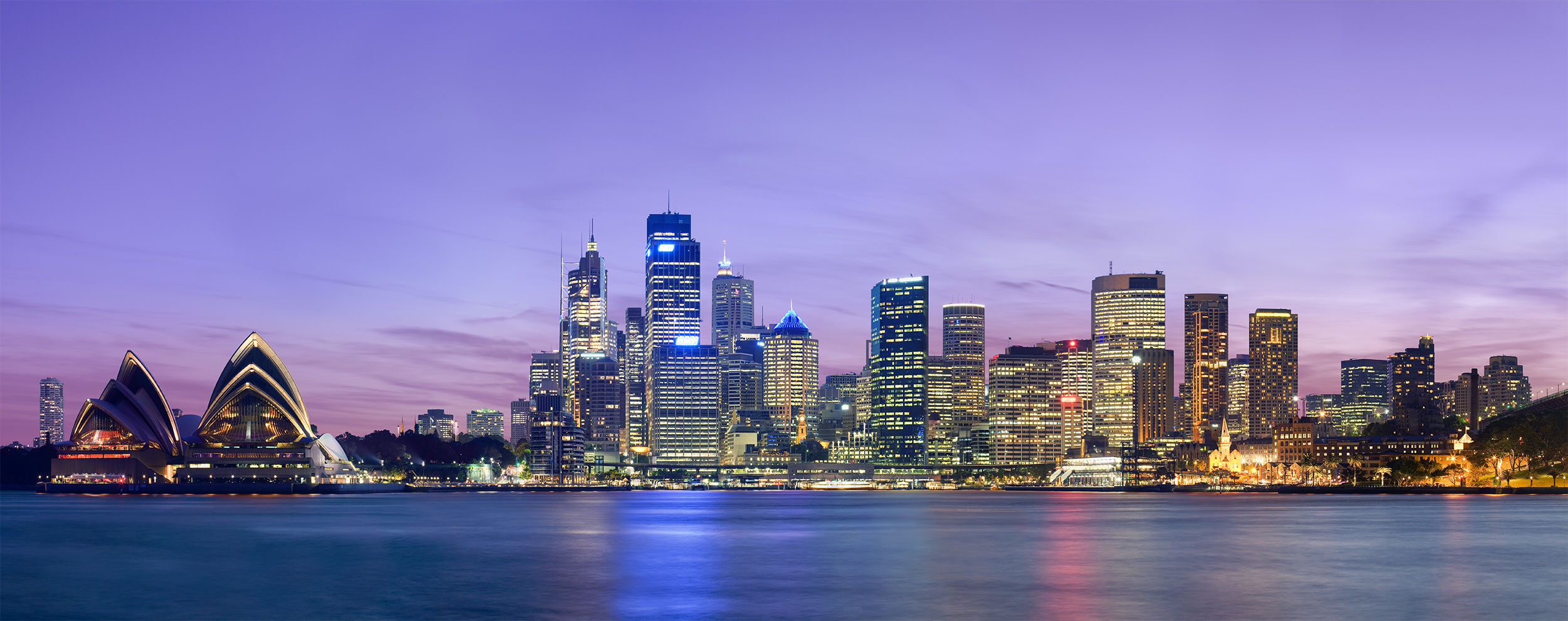
View of Sydney from Jeffrey Street at dusk

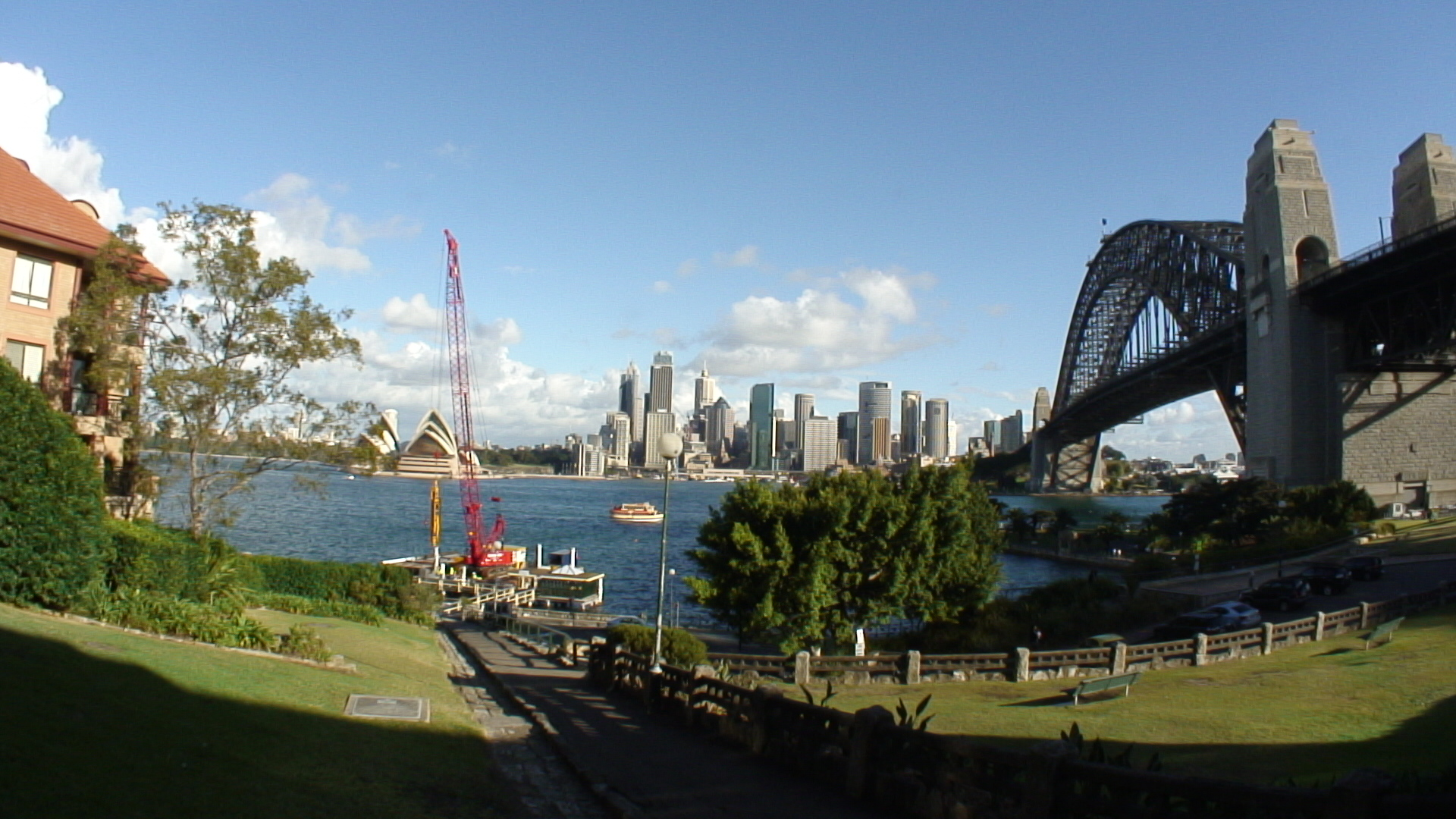
View from Jeffrey(s) Street of Sydney Harbour, the Sydney Harbour Bridge and the Sydney Opera House

The view from Jeffrey Street is known to most Australians; indeed, it is well known internationally. The national Australian television station uses Jeffrey Street on an almost daily basis as their camera location or backdrop for the evening news bulletins. Thus, the view from Jeffrey Street is instantly recognisable to millions of people. Because Jeffrey Street is immediately across the harbour from the city, many Sydney-based professional photographers showcase photographs of the city that they have taken from the street.

The lookouts adjacent to Jeffrey Street are popular tourist destinations. The size of the crowds that often gather here to watch celebrations on the harbour now necessitates strong police and security presence. Jeffrey Street is also a celebrated location for weddings and wedding photographs. Ted Mack, at the time an Independent MP and formerly Mayor of North Sydney, was quoted as saying that it is one of the most important locations in Sydney.

== History of Jeffrey or Jeffreys Street, Kirribilli ==
=== Pre-European history ===
The Aboriginal tribe "Cammeraygal" lived in the Kirribilli and Milson's Point area. The area was a fertile fishing ground and the name "Kirribilli" is the Aboriginal word for "good fishing spot".

=== Early European history ===
==== Samuel Lightfoot ====
Kirribilli was settled early in the history of the colony. One of the first records of land being granted on the "North Shore" was of 30 acres (120,000 m^{2}) on the "North side of the Harbour of Port Jackson opposite Sydney Cove" on 20 February 1794 to a convict, Samuel Lightfoot, whose sentence had expired. (Note: The first land grants north of the harbour occurred on 3 January 1792 to eight marines. This occurred in the Ryde area along the northern bank of the river between Sydney and Parramatta. Grants were subsequently made in February 1792 to ten emancipated convicts (including John or Joseph Carter) at the Field of Mars further up the North Shore in the area of the modern suburb of Ryde.)

Lightfoot was born in about 1763 and was in his mid-twenties when he was transported to Australia for seven years for stealing clothing. He arrived with the First Fleet in 1788 on Charlotte. The Colonial Secretary records (NSW State Records) that the land grant was cancelled and given to Robert Ryan in 1800 with no mention of the intermediate sale to Muir.

After serving his sentence, Lightfoot did not stay in Kirribilli for long. He returned to England soon after his sentence expired and petitioned to be allowed to return with his wife, who however appears not to have sailed. Lightfoot subsequently returned to Australia on HMS Calcutta as a free settler, participating in the effort to establish a settlement at Port Phillip, near the modern city of Melbourne. When the settlement was abandoned, Lightfoot travelled on Ocean from Port Phillip, arriving in Tasmania in 1804. Lieutenant-Governor David Collins subsequently appointed Lightfoot supervisor of the hospital in Hobart Town. Lightfoot died in 1818 aged 65.

There is no other known record of Lightfoot's time in Kirribilli. (Note: Research from the Information Request Service at the State Library of New South Wales, Reference question #: IR141101 on 29 June 2010) Nor is the exact location of the land grant known. The size of the grant of 30 acres (120,000 m^{2}) corresponds to an area of approximately one quarter the area of the Kirribilli peninsula but boundaries on early maps do not correspond to a grant of this size. The area of Jeffrey Street was probably the most attractive area (from an agricultural perspective), being a fertile alluvial area leading to a small beach near the current wharf at Jeffrey Street. Thomas Muir and James Milson subsequently farmed in this general vicinity, but whether their farms included the area of Lightfoot's grant is uncertain.

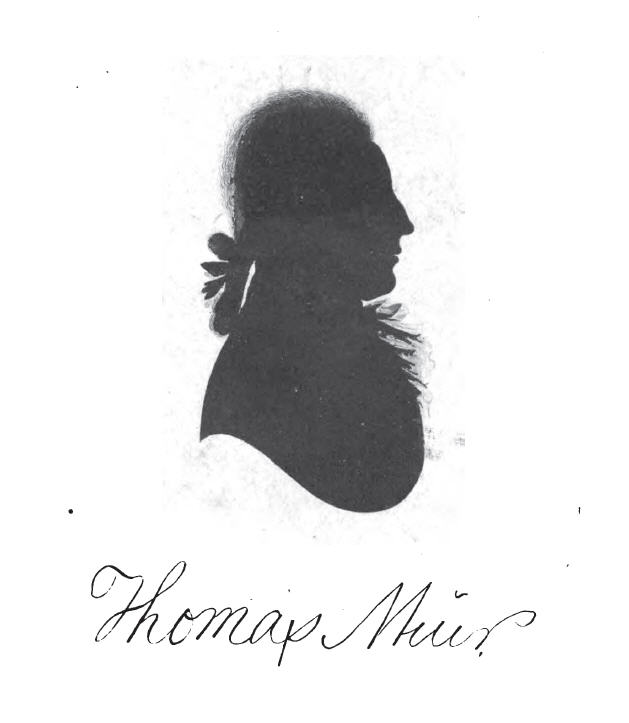
Thomas Muir circa 1793

==== Thomas Muir ====
Thomas Muir of Huntershill, a Scots Martyr accused of religious subversion, acquired Lightfoot's grant in 1794, the same year in which he arrived in the colony. Muir stated in letters that he purchased a "small hut and several acres of land", and accounts indicate that the land was located in the immediate vicinity of Jeffrey Street.

Muir's life is well documented in several books but there is little information about his home in on the North Shore of Sydney Harbour. The accounts vary:

- Most accounts state that the hut was "on the opposite side of the bay" to the early settlement.
- A modern source states that his hut was located on Milsons Point, which is very close to Jeffrey Street.
- A little farm across the water.

The most descriptive modern account states "...the bay that is situated close under the eastern side of the present northern harbour bridge pylon. On the narrow alluvial flat beyond the beach was a small hut and close around Muir was to have his domestic gardens.*** " (Note: The original sources referenced in this book and indicated *** have not been cited. The only narrow alluvial flat in the area is the area between the modern day Jeffrey Street and Broughton Street close to the wharf.)

Some sources allege that Muir purchased the land illegally. The reason for the allegation is that the Colonial Secretary's records have no record of the sale transaction; the record notes simply that the land grant passed from Lightfoot to Ryan. However, it is likely that Muir, who had studied law at Edinburgh University and had passed his bar examinations in 1787 at the age of 22, had arranged a private contract for the sale of the land. If so, this was almost certainly one of the first contracts for the sale of property in Australia.

Muir is recorded as having periodically lived in the area. He also owned a house at Sydney Cove. In 1794 he wrote to a friend in London and said that he had two houses, one here (Sydney Cove) and " another two miles distant, at a farm across the water, which I purchased".

At the date of Mr. Muir's sentence, the colony of New South Wales (now of such vast consequence) was only in its infancy, and hardly known, except to a few intrepid navigators. They first shipment of convicts to it, from this country, was made in the year 1785. And when Mr. Muir reached it, nine years afterwards, there were scarcely 1500 individuals in it altogether. He laboured, with his own hands, to improve and cultivate the land he had purchased, and which, till then, was in a state of native wildness; and, in remembrance of his patrimonial tide and estate in Scotland, he called it Huntershill, by which name we hope it is still known.

— McKenzie, Peter (1792). The Life of Thomas Muir, esq., Younger, of Huntershill. W.R.McPhun.

Muir called the area "Huntershill" (not to be confused with the modern day suburb of "Hunters Hill" further up the harbour). The spelling as a single word appears on a number of early maps and books.

Muir escaped Australia in 1796, aboard an American ship Otter. A good account of his escape from the colony appears in several books and Pierre François Péron chronicled Otter's voyage across the Pacific. After Muir escaped, the government retracted the land grant and the land reverted to the government. Muir died in France two years later.

==== Robert Ryan ====
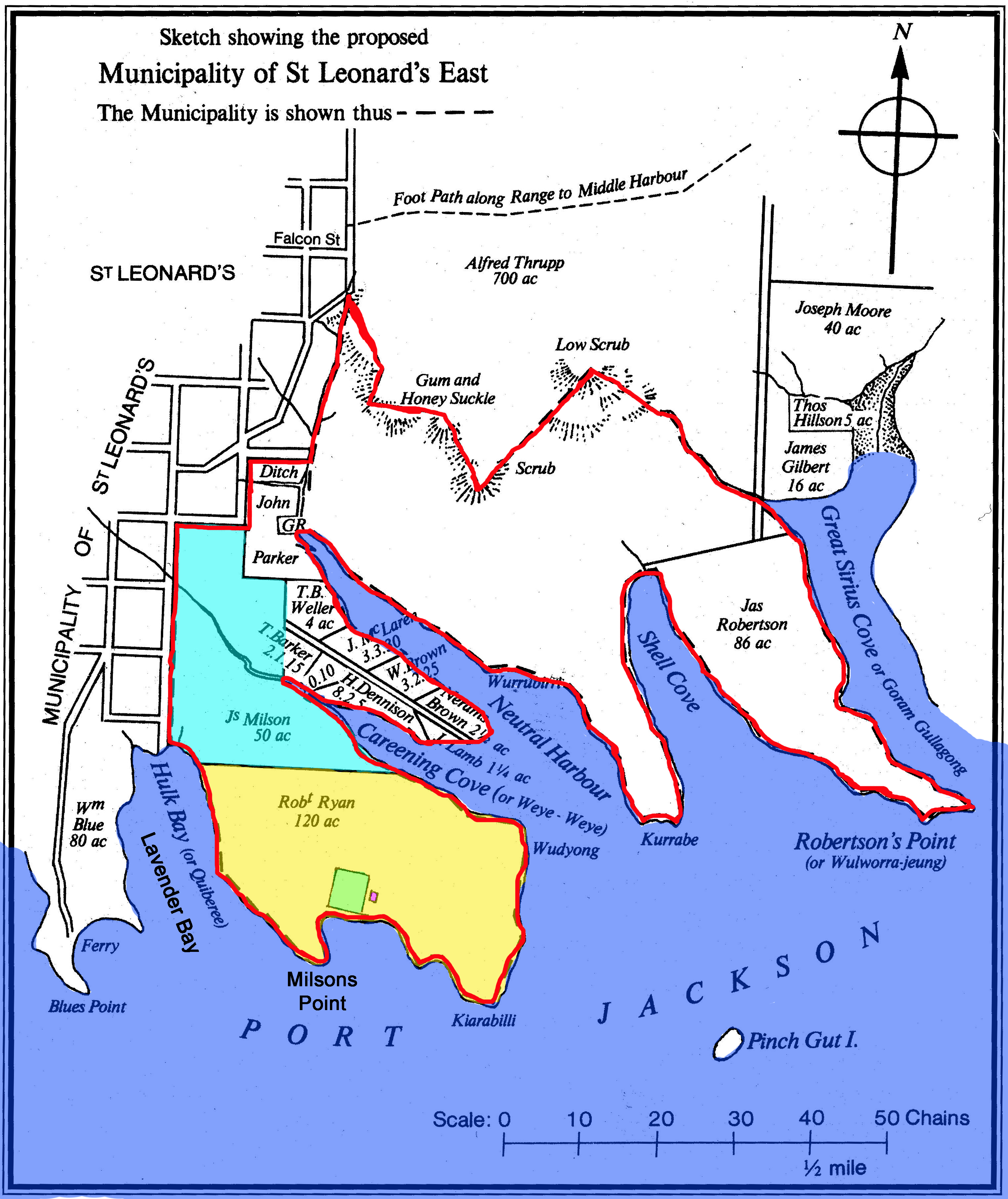
1850s Map is from the 1850s but refers to earlier land grants. Caption reads "Early map published in the North Shore Times 8 May 1963 showing the boundary of the Municipality of St Leonards East, proclaimed 1860." Added to the original map are the words "Lavender Bay" which used to be called Hulk Bay, and "Milsons Point". Colours have also been added. Highlighted in yellow is the original 120 acre grant to Robert Ryan in 1800 that was purchased around 1806 by Robert Campbell; in pale blue is the 50 acre grant to James Milson in August 1824; in green is the approximate position that was marked on the map for the orchard that James Milson was still leasing from Robert Campbell in the 1840s (in the 1820s he leased the whole 120 acres); and in pink is the approximate position that was marked on the map for the farm of F.J. Hilly that was leased from Robert Campbell in the 1840s. The boundary of the Municipality of East St Leonards is marked in red.

Robert Ryan (?-?) was an Irish marine (Private - Royal Marines 32nd (Portsmouth) Company) on the First Fleet assigned to guard the convicts on board the Prince of Wales, a 334-ton transport. Ryan established a relationship with Frances Williams, born circa 1760 in Wales. Williams first appeared before the courts in 1783 in Mold Wales accused of stealing clothing and cloth valued at 1 pound 17 shillings and 5 pence. Frances was found guilty and sentenced to death. The sentence was later commuted to 7 years transportation. Frances met Ryan on the Prince of Wales on the voyage to Australia (a voyage of almost nine months). Soon after the establishment of the settlement at Port Jackson Frances gave birth to a daughter Sarah. It is known that early in 1790 the impending starvation at Sydney Cove led to the transportation of convicts and marines to Norfolk Island. Williams and Ryan arrived in Norfolk Island in March 1790 on board HMS Sirius.

In January 1792 Robert Ryan received a discharge from the New South Wales Marine Corps and a land grant of 60 acres (240,000 m^{2}) located at Mount Pitt Valley, Queenborough Norfolk Island. Frances Williams gave birth to daughter Jane in August 1793. Some sources state that Convict John Cropper is thought to be the father. The 1794 victualling List for Norfolk Island records Frances Williams and 2 children being supported by Robert Ryan. Later in 1794 Robert Ryan abandoned the land and returned to Sydney. He enlisted in the New South Wales Corps, later returning to Norfolk Island with a contingent of soldiers. In December 1796 a son James was born. No name for the father was given. After Robert Ryan left the Island records state that the Norfolk Island community cared for the children. The children eventually moved to Tasmania.

Back in Sydney in 1800, the 30 acres (12 hectares) of Lightfoot's Grant was cancelled and included in a 120-acre (48.5-hectare) grant to Ryan for his service in the marines and the NSW Corps. The corresponding entry in the Register of Land Grants states Cancelled, and a New Grant given to Robert Ryan for 90 acres in addition to this Allotment, by Governor Hunter. See the third Register, Folio 37. This grant surrounded what is now Jeffrey Street and later maps referred.

It is reported that Ryan knew nothing about farming so the land was sold to Robert Campbell in about 1806. Other reliable accounts state that the land was sold to Charles Grimes, the Surveyor General who then quickly on-sold to Campbell.

==== Charles Grimes ====
Details of the sale of the land from Ryan to Charles Grimes, the NSW Surveyor General are not known.

However, it is known that Grimes sold the land relatively quickly to John Palmer who was acting as the agent for Robert Campbell in about 1806. Accounts indicate that Campbell identified the block of land and asked his agent to purchase it before leaving for England. The transaction had been completed by the time he returned.

The block of land included all of the Kirribilli peninsula. It included roughly all of the land between Lavender Bay and Careening Bay, with the northern boundary being where Willoughby Road runs today. Kirribilli Point, Admiralty House, Sydney, Milsons Point and Luna Park, Sydney were all within its boundaries. It ran from Milson's Point for about 600 yards inland. Campbell's main interest in the block of land was the gently sloping foreshores of Careening Bay. There are relatively few places on Sydney Harbour where there are gently sloping foreshores suitable for a shipyard.

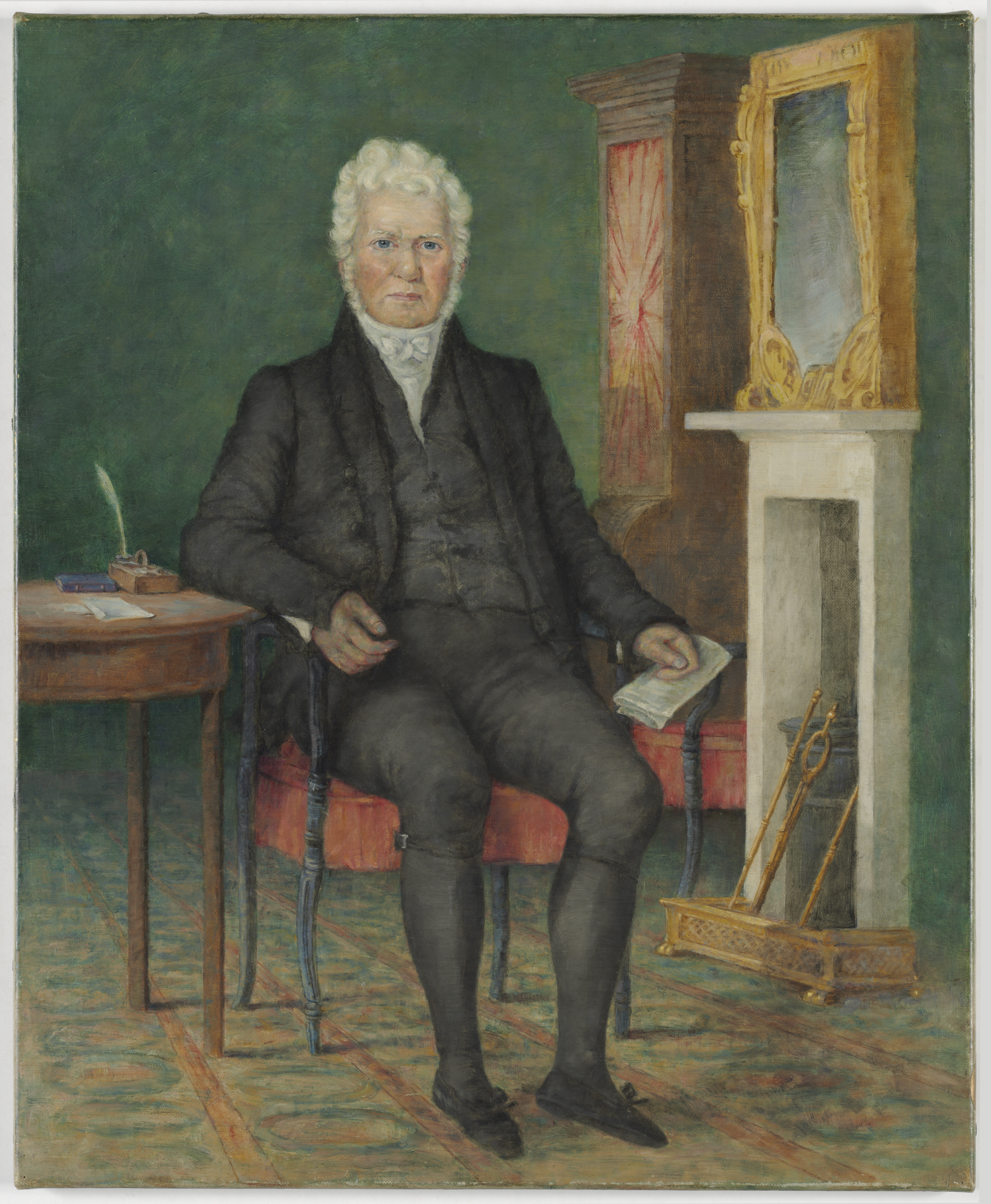
Portrait of Robert Campbell, 1834, by Rodius

==== Robert Campbell ====
Robert Campbell (1769–1846), popularly known as "Robert Campbell of the Wharf", merchant, pastoralist, politician and philanthropist, was born on 28 April 1769 at Greenock, Scotland. After some unprofitable commercial experience in Greenock, Robert at 27 went to India to join his elder brother John, a partner in the Calcutta agency house of Campbell Clarke & Co., established in 1790. In January 1798, a few months after his arrival, Robert was admitted to a partnership and in July 1799 the Clarkes gave up their interest in the firm which became Campbell & Co. In 1796 Campbell Clarke & Co. had sent their first cargo to New South Wales in the Sydney Cove, which had been wrecked on Preservation Island in Bass Strait in February 1797. Robert Campbell first sailed into Sydney aboard the company's ship the Hunter in 1798.

Campbell was forced to sell his first consignment of goods to a syndicate of military officers in return for Paymaster's Bills drawn on London. The enterprising Campbell managed to have discussions with Governor Hunter on mercantile trading possibilities. Campbell ascertained that the Governor was seeking to break the New South Wales Corps officer's profiteering monopoly. Campbell returned to India on the Barwell in August 1798.

Campbell returned to Sydney with another cargo on the Hunter in February 1800. With the governor's permission he took up residence on land bought in 1798 at Dawes Point, where he had begun to build warehouses and a private wharf. Though Campbell's request for permission to establish himself at Sydney as a resident merchant apparently was never pronounced upon by the British Government, Campbell & Co. was soon heavily involved in the Australian trade, having £50,000 worth of goods in its Sydney warehouses by 1804.

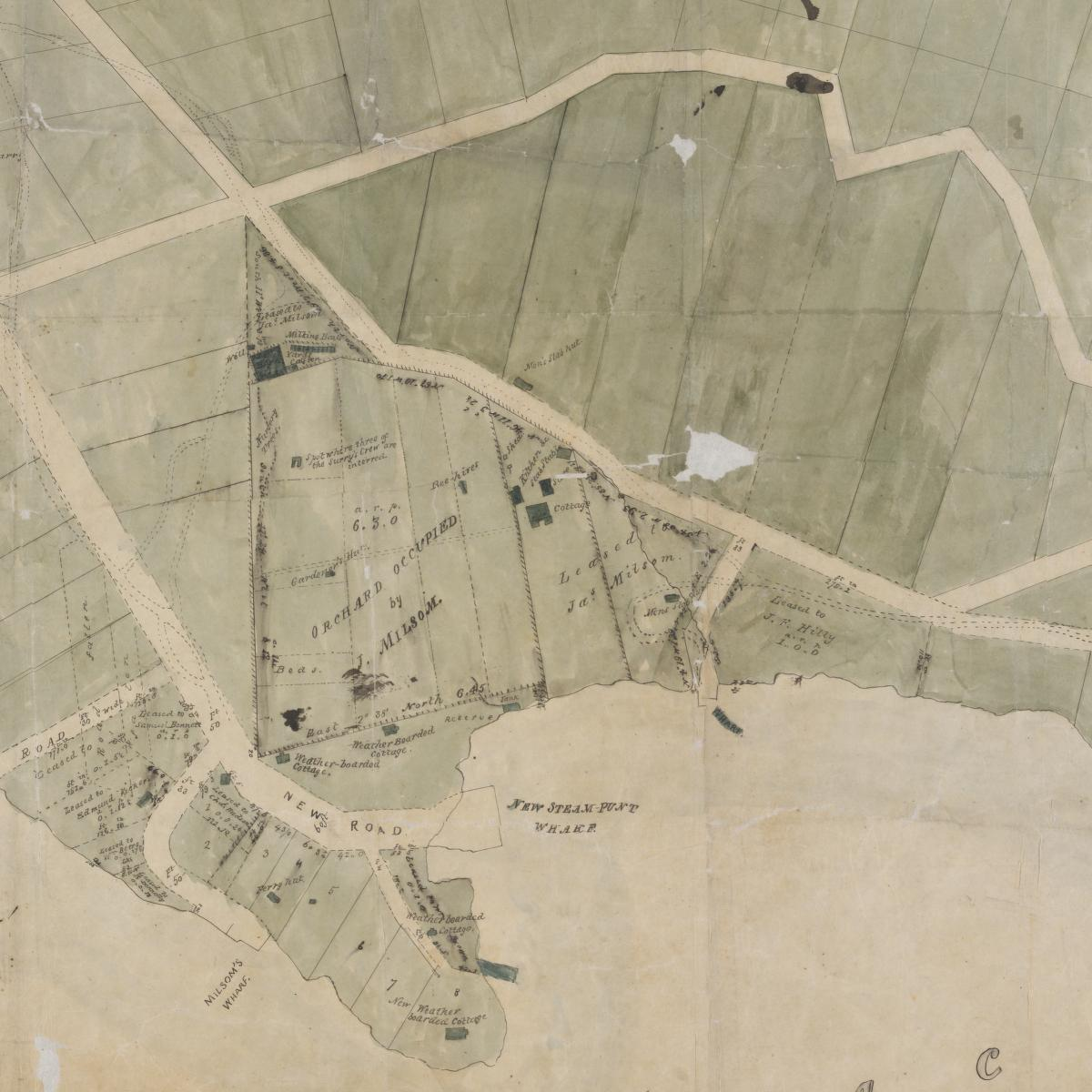
1840s map of the Jeffrey Street area in Kirribilli detailing the land that Campbell leased to Milson for Milson's Orchard & Dairy. The cottage shown on the map is near the southern end of Jeffrey Street.

In January 1805, Campbell returned to England and was involved in a famous court case in London which precipitated the breaking of the monopoly of the British East India Company. Before leaving for England Campbell had approached Philip Gidley King with a plan for to construct a ship in Sydney of 136-tons burthen, and had identified the site of the proposed shipyard in Kirribilli. His agent, John Palmer, purchased the land while Campbell was in England from Charles Grimes, the Surveyor General. The block of land included all of the Kirribilli peninsula.

While Campbell was in London, he studied the building of ships and engaged a number of tradesmen and foremen to return to Sydney with him and work for him in his new shipyard. The land was cleared in his absence and timber was held in readiness at Campbell's Wharf.

Campbell arrived back in the colony on the Albion in August 1806 in company with James Milson. By this time Robert Campbell was the largest private owner of cattle in the colony and one of the richest men in NSW. Campbell never occupied the land in Kirribilli. Campbell did however build Australia's first shipbuilding yards in 1807, at the site that is now the Royal Sydney Yacht Squadron, at the eastern end of Kirribilli. Campbell lived at Dawes Point, by 1810 he had added another wharf and his house was described as being 'finished in an elegant manner with colonnades & two fronts'.

Robert Campbell's estate commissioned the 1840s map held at the National Library of Australia which bears his name. The map shows the Kirribilli area divided into subdivisions. Some of the subdivisions proposed on this map eventuated and can be readily compared with modern maps.

Campbell left a complex will. Eventually each of the sons received one-sixth of the estate while both daughters' shares passed on to the Jeffreys family by about 1880. The west side of Jeffreys Street was left to George Campbell, the youngest son. He also became the owner of Duntroon. The east side of Jeffreys Street was left to the elder sons, John and Robert Campbell. They also became the owners of the wharf and of the whole business of Campbell & Co. in Sydney. Arthur Jeffreys was left the block of land immediately to the north of Jeffreys Street, on the northern side of Fitzroy Street.

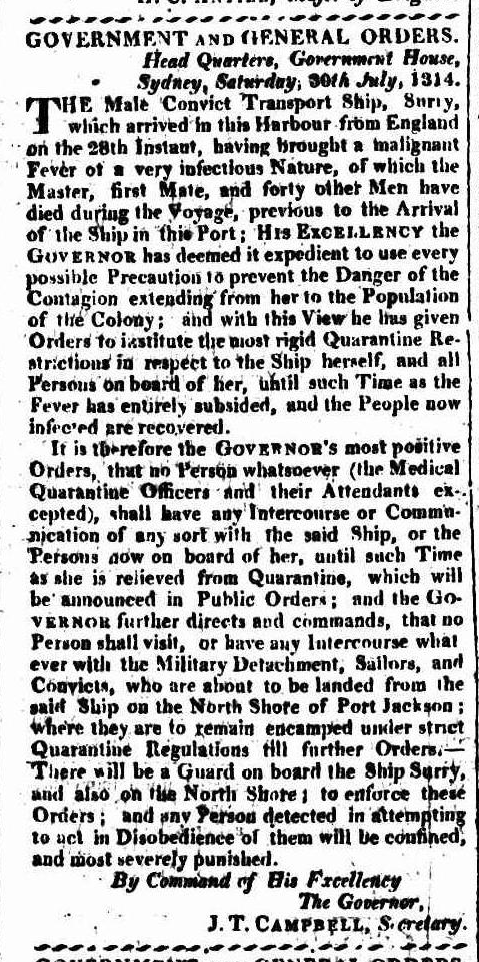
Quarantine of the convict ship Surry on the North Shore

==== Quarantine of the convict ship Surry ====
In 1814 Surry transported 200 male convicts to Australia, guarded by 25 men of the 46th Regiment. During the voyage out from England malignant fever (typhoid fever) raged on board and a total of 42 men died before the ship anchored in Port Jackson on 27 July 1814. Of these 42 men: 36 were convicts (listed with their names and dates of death in the Sydney Gazette of 10 September 1814), 2 were of the ship's crew, 2 were soldiers from the 46th Regiment, 1 was the 1st (Chief) Mate, and shortly before the ship anchored the Master (Captain) of the ship also died.

The "malignant fever of a very infectious nature" resulted in Surry being placed in quarantine on the "North Shore". Convicts were landed and a camp established in the immediate vicinity of what is now Jeffrey Street in Kirribilli. Quarantine restrictions were lifted for the ship on 13 August 1814, but the restrictions on the camp lasted longer.

Thus, the area of Jeffrey Street was the first site in Australia to be used for quarantine purposes. Some sources incorrectly state that North Head was the first site in Australia to be used for quarantine purposes when the Bussorah Merchant was detained in Spring Cove, Sydney, in 1828. This, however, was not until 10 years later.

The 1840s map of the area of Jeffrey Street (see above) identifies the graves for 3 typhoid victims with the notation "Spot where three of Surry's crew are interred". These graves are stated to be the site of the first burials on the North Shore. One of those buried is known to have been the ship's surgeon who attended the typhoid victims. In 1925-26 when homes were being demolished for the construction of the Sydney Harbour Bridge, the gravestones were found being used as hearthstones in cottages in what is now Bradfield Park (located approximately 50-metres west of the location of the graves shown on the early map), and included the gravestone of the surgeon.

The 42 deaths before the ship anchored, plus the 3 graves brings the death toll to 45 (assuming that the 3 graves were all for deaths that occurred after the ship anchored). Bateson, however, states that there were a total of 51 deaths before the quarantine was lifted and lists the additional 9 deaths as the 2nd Mate, the boatswain, an additional 4 seaman, an additional 2 soldiers, and the surgeon.

Thomas Raine was a junior officer on board Surry. The epidemic of typhus left him the only surviving officer. He subsequently commanded her for the next three voyages (1816, 1819, 1823).

Raine's grandson Tom Raine founded Raine & Horne, an Australian real estate franchise in 1883. There is a memorial to Raine slightly to the west of the Jeffrey Street Wharf.

==== James Milson ====
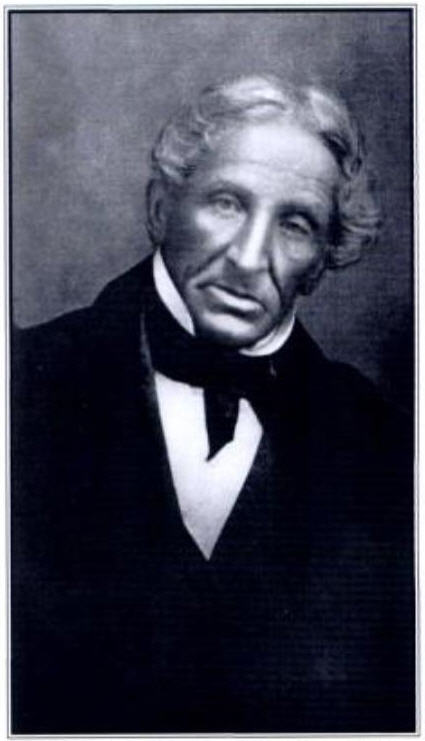
James Milson (1785–1872)

Twenty-three-year-old James Milson arrived in Port Jackson (Sydney) on the Albion on 19 August 1806 as one of the earliest free settlers in the Colony of New South Wales. His motivation for immigrating was the same as the many who followed him, the promise of free land. He was a native of Lincolnshire experienced in farming and was welcomed by the colonists, desperate for men with agricultural knowledge. He married in 1810 and subsequently raised a family of 6 children.

Milson did well in the Colony of New South Wales, and established a number of prosperous businesses, including an orchard and a dairy in the vicinity of Jeffrey Street.

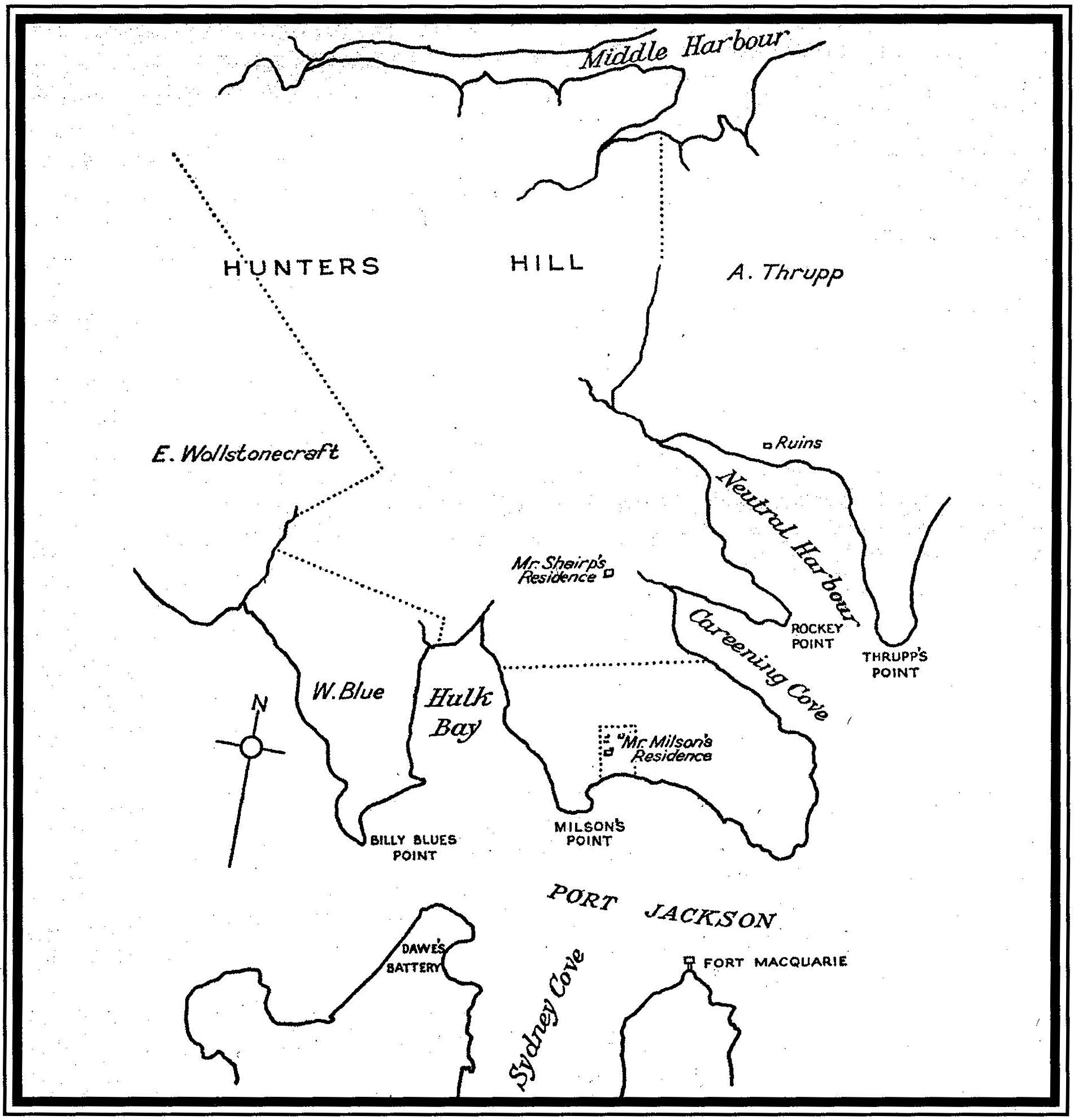
Sketch map of the Kirribilli area first published in 1955 in the book "The Life and Times of James Milson" showing approximate location of Milson's residence and that of his son-in-law William Shairp who married Milson's daughter Sophia in 1827. The perforated line marks the approximate boundary between Milson's 50 acres in the north and Campbell's 120 acres in the south.

- In the early 1820s Milson settled in the District of Sydney in the vicinity of Jeffrey Street on 120 acres of land he leased from Robert Campbell.
- In 1824 Milson received a 50-acre grant of his own adjoining Campbell's land (refer to the 1850s map above).
- In 1826 a bushfire raged through the area destroying Milson's home, orchard and dairy and farm which he subsequently rebuilt.
- In 1831 Campbell was involved with Milson in a court action over Milson's non-payment of the lease of the 120 acres.
- Milson lived in the vicinity of Jeffrey Street until 1831 when he built a new home on his 50 acres facing Lavender Bay.
- By the 1840s Milson was leasing only the portion Campbell's 120 acres that contained Milson's orchard in the vicinity of Jeffrey Street.

Milson was a prominent resident of the area for more than 50 years until his death in 1872 at home at "Grantham" in the modern suburb of Milsons Point in what was then called the Municipality of East St Leonards.

Milson and his sons and grandsons built several homes in the area: "Brisbane House" (James Milson), "Grantham" (James Milson), "Fern Lodge" (James Milson), "Wia Wia" (John Milson), "Elamang" (James Milson Jnr), "Coreena" (Alfred Milson, son of James Milson Jnr), and "Wayala" (Arthur Milson, son of James Milson Jnr). Milson's son-in-law William Shairp also built "Carabella". Fern Lodge (heritage listed) and Elamang (in the grounds of the Loreto Convent) were still standing in 2008.

Milsons Point, the headland into Sydney Harbour on which the north pylons of the Sydney Harbour Bridge stand, and the suburb on this headland to the west of Kirribilli, are both named after James Milson. A retirement village at North Sydney that includes a nursing home is also named after him.

==== Thomas Jeffrey ====
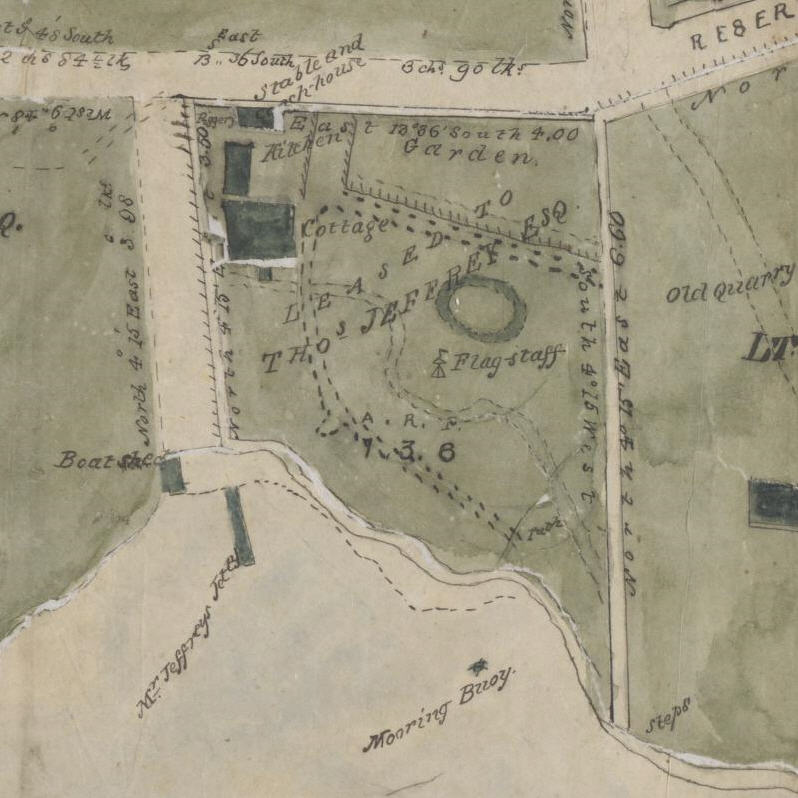
First known map of Kirribilli showing an area leased to Thomas Jeffrey circa 1840

A lot is known about Thomas Jeffrey. He was known for example to the Father of Federation, Sir Henry Parkes and letters survive of their correspondence. Jeffrey is known to have been appointed as "Landing Waiter, Searcher and Gauger" in the Department of Customs on 15 July 1831. He is also named in Court documents (Decisions of the Superior Courts of New South Wales, 1788–1899) as a "Boarding Officer". He worked at the Customs House in Kirribilli, an influential position in the early colony, most probably the most senior citizen resident in Kirribilli for many years. His funeral notice describes him as the "Landing Surveyor and Second Officer of Customs". His name was mentioned frequently in the papers at the time in a professional capacity, including shipping news, customs lists and police events.

Jeffrey had the first registered land dealing in the area on 10 October 1838 when he leased 1 acre 3 rods and 6 perches of it from Robert Campbell.

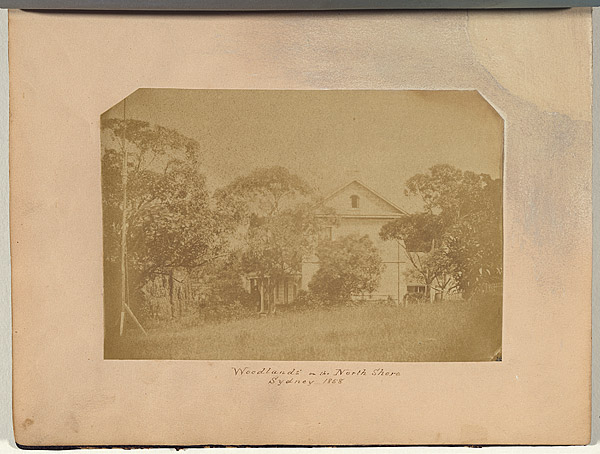
Early photograph of Woodlands on the North Shore, the home of Thomas Jeffrey, photograph circa 1858

His property "Woodlands", which was described as having "a beautiful view of the harbour", was located adjacent to Admiralty House. In 1842 Admiralty House was leased to, and later bought by, the Colonial Collector of Customs, Lt. Colonel J.G.N. Gibbes, as the site for his residence. Customs was an important early government function located in Kirribilli. Jeffrey died in 1847. The house was sold after his death by his widow. A photograph of Woodlands is held by the National Gallery of Australia.

Thomas Jeffrey's name appears on the 1840s map of Kirribilli area as leasing a property in the vicinity of what is now Beulah Street. The map shows the development on his lease at the time including a stable and coach-house, kitchen, cottage, flag-staff and a jetty marked "Mr Jeffreys Jetty". The presence of the flag-staff indicating the Customs House, an important location for all ships entering the harbour. Significantly the flag-staff is also visible in the very early photo which is possibly the first known photograph of Kirribilli. The "Mr Jeffreys Jetty" is in the approximate location of the modern Beulah Street Wharf. Thomas Jeffrey was a leading local citizen at the time, and it is likely that Jeffrey Street was originally named in his honour.

==== John Jeffreys ====
The North Sydney Council leaflet on Greencliffe mentions a John Jeffreys. Greencliffe was one of North Sydney's former early sandstone homes, and occupied a prime position at Kirribilli possessing outstanding views of the harbour. The original house, located at 51-53 Kirribilli Avenue (on the corner of Jeffrey Street), was built in the 1860s by Mrs Mary Paul, who ran a boarding house nearby at Milsons Point in 1858–1859. The leaflet states that Milson retained the lease until 1841, a John Jeffreys taking over the lease from that time. The North Sydney Council leaflet on Greencliffe states that Jeffreys Street and the wharf are named after him.

It is likely that this is a mistake but there is no supporting evidence, indeed other Council records attribute the name to Arthur Jeffreys (refer Arthur Jeffreys below). There is no other record of a John Jeffreys in the early colony. The first record of any John Jeffreys arrived in Sydney on 10 April 1851 on the Deucalion from San Francisco. A John Jeffreys appeared before a magistrate in Paddington in the same year.

==== Arthur Frederick Jeffreys ====
Arthur (Frederick) Jeffreys (born in Surrey, England, in 1811) was a clergyman's son who decided to emigrate to Australia when aged in his late 20s. He arrived in Sydney on 20 February 1839, on the Honduras. Prior to emigrating he was a commissioned lieutenant in the Royal Navy. Arthur Jeffreys married Sarah Campbell, the daughter of Robert Campbell, in 1841. In 1843, at the end of a severe five-year-long drought, Jeffreys purchased a property of 1,742 acres (7.05 km^{2}), near Queanbeyan, NSW, which he named "Acton" after a town in Denbighshire, Wales. The name is perpetuated in the City of Canberra suburb of Acton, which forms part of the Australian Capital Territory. Robert Campbell was one of the considerable pastoralists, merchants and land-owners in the early colony of NSW with significant land holdings in Kirribilli, Duntroon on the Limestone Plains, and the Canterbury Estate near Sydney, among others. By way of marriage into the Campbells, Arthur Jeffreys, became a prominent land-owner in Kirribilli.

There is no known record that Arthur and Sarah Jeffreys ever lived in the area. When Robert Campbell died in 1846, Arthur Jeffreys inherited a proportion of the estate in Kirribilli and also a large estate in what became the residential Sydney suburb of Canterbury. By this time Jeffreys was a wealthy man. A son was born on 30 Dec 1845, possibly John Jeffreys.

In about 1850 Jeffreys built a "palatial colonial mansion", called Canterbury House in the modern day suburb of Canterbury. This was a large dwelling set at the end of a wide avenue of trees of sufficient importance and interest to have been painted by Conrad Martens. He subsequently became a member of the New South Wales Legislative Council (1851–54). He was the Elective Member of the first Legislative Council 1843 - 1856 for the Pastoral District of Maneroo Jeffreys died in England 1861 and his family also returned there to live.

The son of Jeffreys Senior, Arthur Frederick Jeffreys (who was born in Kirribilli in 1848), continued to visit Australia from England. He reportedly sold the land occupied by the modern-day site of the Kirribilli Neighbourhood Centre at the top of Jeffrey Street in 1873. Later in life he became a British Conservative politician. A grandson became a prominent military commander and was elevated to the peerage as Baron Jeffreys in 1952.

It is also possible that Jeffrey(s) Street was named after Arthur Jeffreys. The subdivision of the Canterbury estate by Miss Campbell in 1878 resulted in a Jeffrey's Road in Canterbury.

== Early structures ==
The Cottage at the corner of Pitt and Jeffrey Streets, on the site of what is now St. Aloysius' College pre-1907

=== Cottage (demolished early 1900s) ===
Plans and a photograph (circa 1907) remain of the early cottage at the corner of Pitt and Jeffrey Street, the site of what is now St Aloysius' College. It is not known when the cottage was demolished.

=== Terraces (demolished 1920s) ===
Most of the terraces and cottages in nearby streets were demolished in order to construct the approaches for the bridge (refer map). Almost all of the properties between Alfred Street and Fitzroy Street shown on the detailed 1890s block plan were demolished. Photographs of many of the demolished terrace houses and cottages are held by North Sydney Council and are available online.

Thus the row of terraces in Jeffrey Street have become historically important largely because they are the survivors. Smaller rows survived on the west side of the bridge, but the row in Jeffrey Street is the longest surviving row on the North Shore.

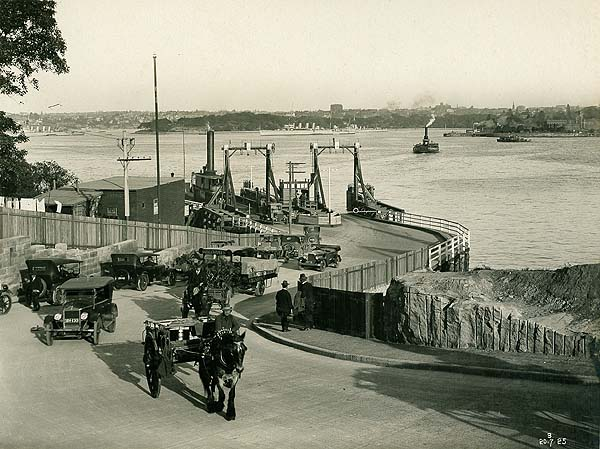
Jeffrey Street Vehicular Ferry Docks and Road in Approach (1925)

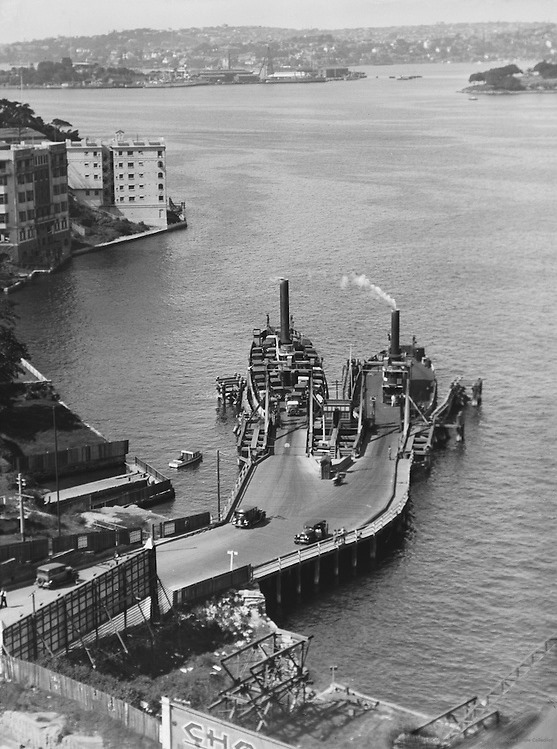
Sydney car ferries at Kirribilli 1930 before the opening of the Sydney Harbour Bridge

=== Vehicular Ferry Docks (demolished 1930s) ===
Prior to the construction of the Sydney Harbour Bridge, the "Jeffrey Street Ferry Docks" was the main vehicular ferry terminal for the North Shore of Sydney. A number of vehicular ferries were constructed in the area, the last was constructed in about 1925 and was used until after the opening of the Sydney Harbour Bridge.

The last ferry terminal was demolished in the 1930s.

=== Construction of Sydney Harbour Bridge (circa 1930) ===
The construction of the Sydney Harbour Bridge was a significant event in Australian history, numerous books have been written on the subject. Jeffrey Street, being immediately adjacent to the bridge approaches featured prominently in photographs of the event.

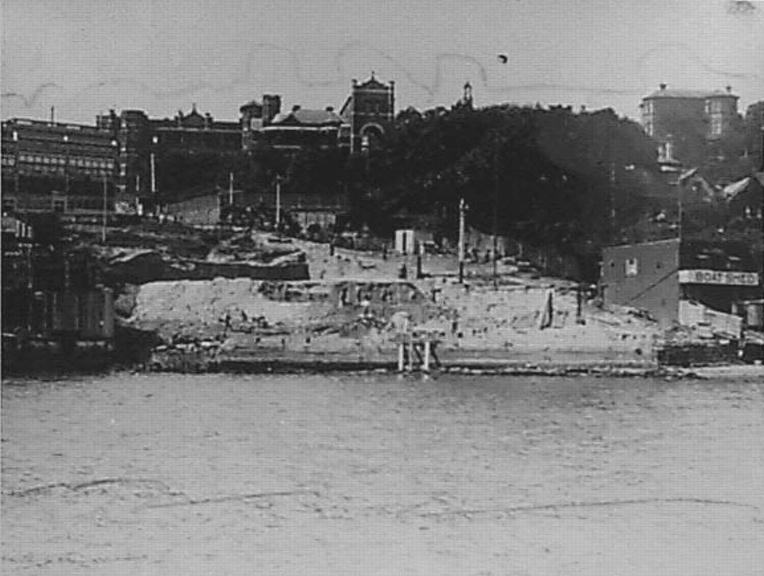
Photograph shows construction on foreshores of Kirribilli above Jeffrey Street c.1930s. St. Aloysius College incorporating Dr. Cox's home and the tower of Star of the Sea Church on the skyline. The homes Greencliffe and Craiglea are also visible on the right hand side above M. Steel boatshed.

=== Dr. Cox's home (demolished 1970s) ===
In 1902, a property owned by Dr Cox, adjoining the "Our Lady, Star of the Sea" church was rented by St Aloysius' College for £225 and a few years later bought by the college for £4,500. The area bounded by Jeffrey Street, Clapham Rise (Upper Pitt St) and Campbell St (Kirribilli Ave) was small – about three quarters of an acre. The building with its crenellated tower and lace iron balconies was set in picturesque surroundings and commanded an unimpeded view of the harbour.

St Aloysius' College in Kirribilli was opened on 2 February 1903.

=== Church (demolished 1978) ===
The First Congregational Church on the North Shore was built at Jeffrey Street in 1863 but it went out of use in 1869. The church was acquired by the Jesuits in 1878 and blessed by Archbishop Vaughan on 7 November 1880. It was given the name, "Our Lady, Star of the Sea". To avoid confusion, the church at Ridge St previously known as "Our Lady, Star of the Sea" from then on was known as "St Mary's". In 1903 "Star of the Sea" became the chapel for St Aloysius' College, which had just moved from Surry Hills into a large house next to the church formerly owned by Dr. Cox.

In 1940 extensive alterations were made to the church. A refurbished sanctuary and sacristies were built, the entrance and porch were moved to the northern end facing Pitt Street. Further changes were carried in the early 1950s to bring the building into line with the trend towards simplicity. After 1965 "Star of the Sea" was no longer used. It was demolished in 1978 to enlarge St Aloysius' College.

The modern "Star of the Sea Church" in Willoughby Street was blessed and opened in 1970.

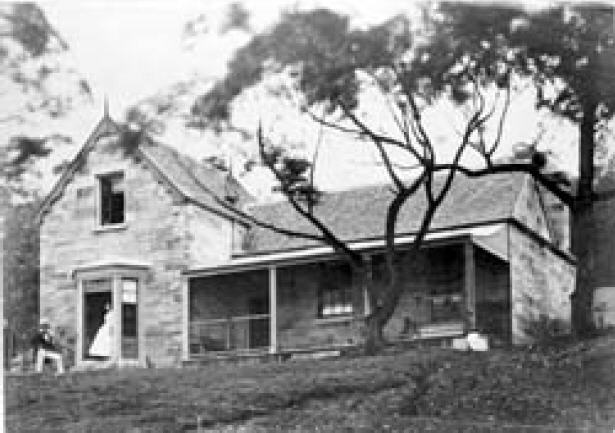
Greencliffe circa 1885

=== Greencliffe (demolished 1994) ===
Greencliffe, one of North Sydney's former early sandstone homes, occupied a prime position on the corner of what is now Jeffrey Street and Kirribilli Avenue at 51–53 Kirribilli Avenue.

The original house was built in the 1860s by Mrs Mary Paul, who ran a boarding house nearby at Milsons Point in 1858–1859. The first record of Mrs Paul living at Greencliffe appears in the "Sands Directories" in 1864. The house itself had undergone numerous alterations and additions throughout its history including an eastern wing added sometime before 1880 and a substantial Italianate style addition which was built around the sandstone cottage in 1884. By the 1920s the house was turned into residential flats – the trend of the day in the Kirribilli area.

Greencliffe was demolished in 1994 and redeveloped into modern apartments.

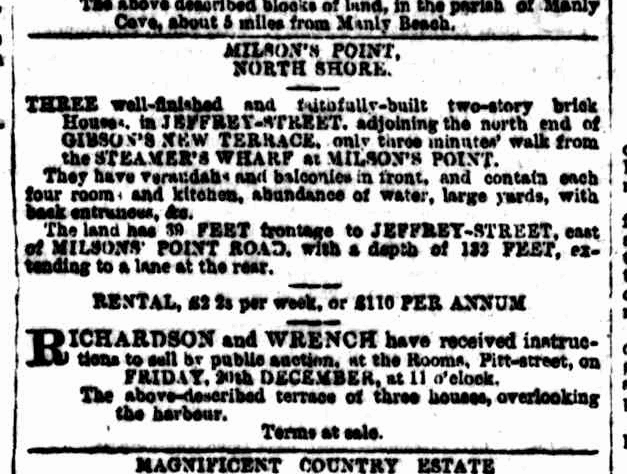
Auction sales notice of the original terraces at 52-56 Jeffrey Street

=== Original terraces 52–56 Jeffrey St (demolished 1990s) ===
Three terraces were constructed at 52–56 Jeffrey Street in about 1878 at the northern end of the "Gibson's New Terrace" which is how the row of terraces from 44 to 50 Jeffrey Street were known at the time. These terraces were demolished in the 1990s.

== Modern landmarks and structures ==
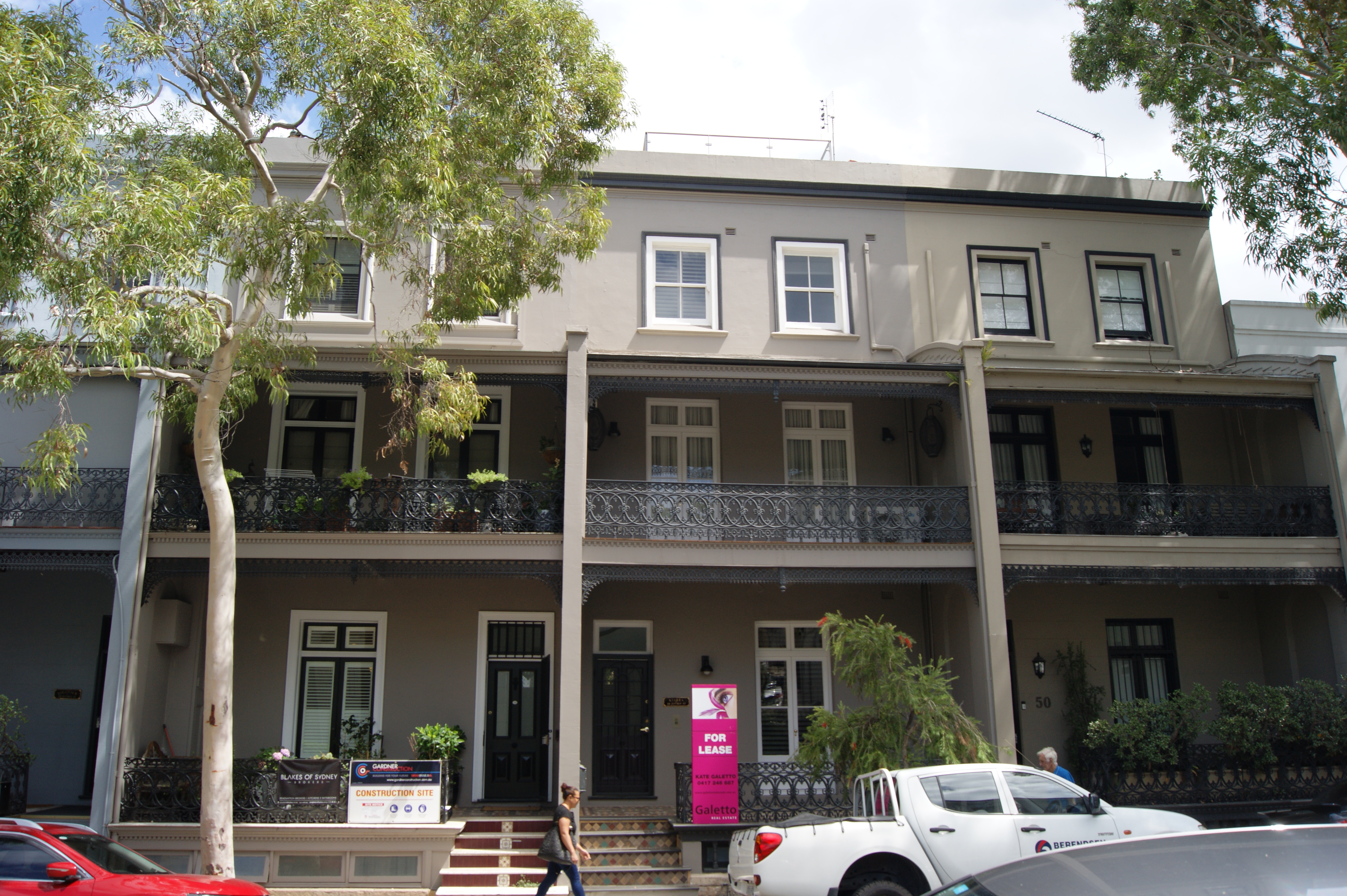
Three-storey gentrified Victorian terrace houses on Jeffrey Street

=== Landmarks ===
The main landmarks in the street are as follows (walking away from the harbour up the hill i.e. listed from south to north):

- Jeffrey(s) Street Wharf: South end of street. The provenance or derivation of the name is disputed. Refer separate heading below.
- Memorial to Thomas Raine: Located on the foreshore, slightly to the west of Jeffrey Street Wharf. Raine was the surviving officer of the Surry.
- Footpath / track paved with sandstone blocks: The path at the south end of Jeffrey Street running up the hill from the Jeffrey Street Wharf to Kirribilli Avenue is possibly the remains of the old road. If so, this would be the oldest track on the Lower North Shore of Sydney Harbour, and one of the oldest tracks in Australia.
- Captain Henry Waterhouse Reserve: East side of wharf. Captain Henry Waterhouse, a midshipman, then a lieutenant, sailed in the First Fleet. He commanded HMS Reliance from 1794, bringing George Bass and Matthew Flinders, "Bass and Flinders" to the Colony. Waterhouse, along with Captain Hunter and Lieutenant Bradley, conducted the first survey of Sydney Harbour, completed on 17 March 1788. He is also credited with the first transportation of merino sheep into Australia. In 1994 an area of foreshore land was dedicated for use as a public reserve by the Waterhouse family
- Copes Lookout: East side of track above wall. William Cope owned land and properties in the area in the late 19th century. It is possible that Cope's Lookout refers to this William Cope. (Note: North Sydney Council website states that there are numerous references to "Cope and King" as property owners in the Kirribilli area in East St. Leonards Minute Books held by North Sydney Council.)
- Jeffreys Street Lookout: East side of track below Kirribilli Avenue.
- Stanton Lookout: West side of track below Kirribilli Avenue. Named after Alderman James Street Stanton, Mayor of North Sydney 1938/39.
- St Aloysius' College: East side of street. An independent, Catholic, day school for boys secondary school. Refer separate heading below.
- The Miguel Pro Playhouse: East side of street. The St Aloysius' College drama theatre.
- Whyalla: East side of street. A Victorian mansion which is the senior school (years 11 and 12) for St Aloysius' College. Refer separate heading below.
- Dalton Hall: Completed 2011 on the east side of the street. The building houses a pool and gymnasium for St Aloysius' College.
- Kirribilli Neighbourhood Centre: The Council operated Kirribilli Neighbourhood Centre is at the north end of Jeffrey Street at the intersection of Fitzroy Street. Refer separate heading below.

=== Terraces ===
The row of 17 heritage-listed terraces on the west side of Jeffrey Street is one of the oldest largely intact streets in Sydney and has changed very little for more than 100 years. The row of terraces is the second longest unbroken line of heritage listed terraces in Australia. (Note: Exceeded only by the 21 heritage listed properties from 47 to 87 Lower Fort Street in Millers Point at the Rocks.) The relevant North Sydney Council Heritage records for the heritage listed terraces is reproduced below together with known information about the construction date. These 17 terrace houses have all been gazetted as heritage items by the Local Council and appear on the NSW Heritage database. (Note: The terraces at 18, 20, 22, 24, 26, 28, 30, 32, 34, 36, 38, 40, 42, 44, 46, 48 and 50 Jeffrey Street are all heritage listed.)

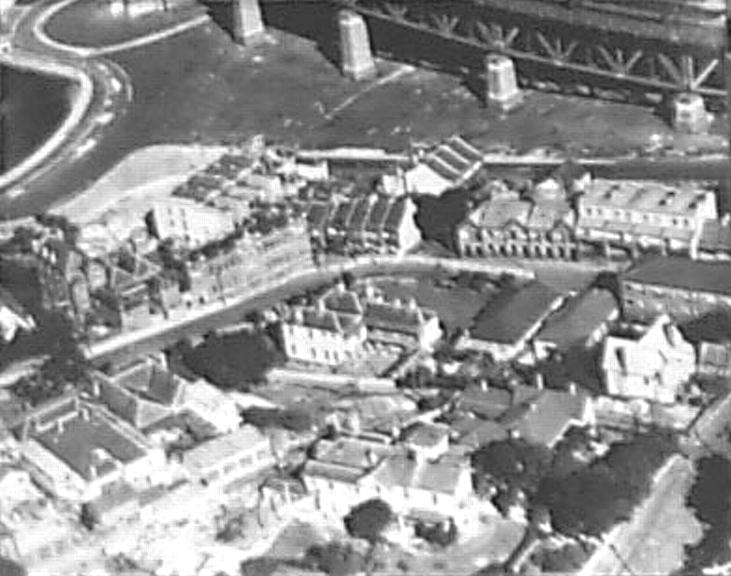
Aerial view of St Aloysius College and immediate vicinity showing the row of terraces in Jeffrey Street and the Sydney Harbour Bridge (1940s)

The aerial photo taken in about the 1940s provides a good view of the cottages. The modern streetscape is more difficult to see because of trees. Almost all of the buildings in the foreground (except for Wyalla) have since been demolished and now form part of St Aloysius' College.

- Terraces from 18 to 24 Jeffrey Street: The row of 4 terraces from 18 to 24 Jeffrey Street are likely to have been the first row of terraces constructed. They are at the southern end of the street, closest to the harbour and appear on the 1890s plan. The exact date of construction is not known.
- Terraces from 26 to 32 Jeffrey Street: The row of four terraces from 26 to 32 Jeffrey Street do not appear on the 1890s plan. The exact date of construction is not known. The terraces at 28 and 32 are now owned by St Aloysius' College and are used by the school.

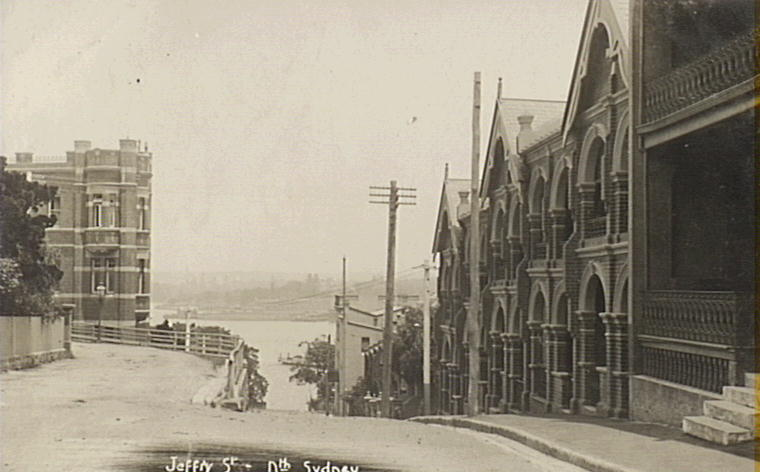
Postcard of 'Jeffrey Street', North Sydney circa 1905 featuring the terraces from 34 to 42 Jeffrey Street

- Terraces from 34 to 42 Jeffrey(s): This row of five terraces do not appear on the 1890s plan. Described in the NSW Heritage register as

One of a two storey terrace of five houses (nos. 34, 36, 38, 40, 42 Jeffreys Street) each characteristed by upper and lower verandah valences formed as heavily moulded brick and stucco pairs of semi-circular arches with elaborate cast-iron balustrades. The two flanking and the centre house each have a projecting gable to the street frontage.

The 1905 postcard shows this row of terrace houses. The exact date of construction is not known but would have been prior to 1900. The NSW Heritage database states the 1880s but the early maps suggest that it might have been the 1890s. The Jeffrey Street facade of this row of terraces is virtually unchanged more than 110 years after they were originally constructed.

- Terraces from 44 to 50 Jeffrey Street: These terraces appear in the 1890s block plan. The exact date of construction is not known, some records state 1878. Newspaper advertisements at the time refer to these terraces as "Gibson's New Terrace". It appears that Gibson was the proprietor of the "Gibson's Hotel" in Milsons Point. A notice appeared in the Sydney Morning Herald on 26 October 1878 offering the row of 4 terraces for let or for sale.

Again, the Jeffrey Street facade of this row of tall terraces is virtually unchanged more than 110 years after they were originally constructed.

- Terraces from 52 to 56 Jeffrey Street: These town-house/ terraces are of modern construction. The earliest reference to houses in Jeffrey Street was in the Sydney Morning Herald on 14, 18 and 19 December 1878 for:

"THREE well-finished and faithfully built two-story brick Houses in JEFFREY-STREET, adjoining the north end of GIBSON'S NEW TERRACE, only three minutes' walk from the STEAMER'S WHARF at MILSON'S POINT."

It is almost certain that these advertisements refer to the terraces from 52-56 Jeffrey(s) Street. These terraces were demolished circa 2000 and the three new terraces constructed at 52, 54 and 56 Jeffrey Street (these modern terraces are not heritage listed).

=== Wyalla ===
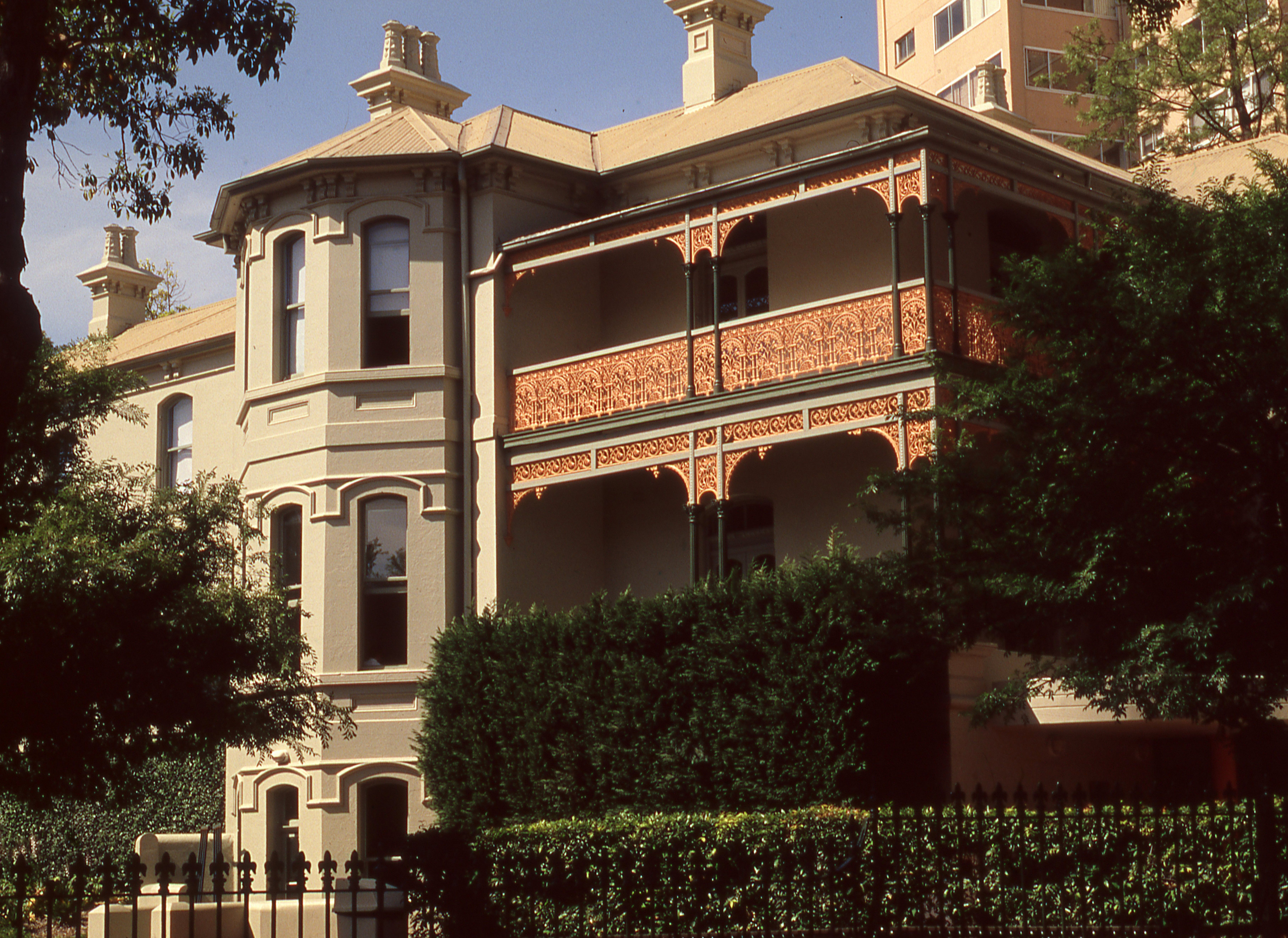
Wyalla which forms part of St Aloysius' College (2007)

"Wyalla" is the large mansion set well back from the east side of the street at the intersection of Jeffrey Street and Upper Pitt Street. (Note: Wyalla forms part of St Aloysius' College. The address is actually 46 Upper Pitt Street but it appears to front Jeffrey Street) Wyalla is a later-19th century mansion designed in the Victorian Italianate style. The heritage listing notes that it is a large two storey Italianate house with an asymmetrical front having a projecting three-facet bay with moulded details to segmental arch windows. The south wing behind has a two-storey verandah with cast-iron posts in pairs and lace balustrades and valences. The north wing is sparsely detailed by comparison, with no verandahs. Hipped gable roof is clad in corrugated-iron and moulded cornices are bracketed.

The early history of the house has not been researched but it was purchased 1916 by St Aloysius' College and has housed the school since then.

=== St Aloysius' College ===
Postcard of St. Aloysius College, Milsons Point c. 1910 – 1920 (demolished c. 1961)

The present day site of St Aloysius' College was previously occupied by a small, stone church built in 1863 by Congregationalists, Wesleyans and Anglicans. The church had fallen into disuse, reportedly due to the lack of a congregation. The original stone church was purchased by the Jesuits in 1880 to serve the district of Kirribilli and Milsons Point.

Archbishop of Sydney Cardinal Moran urged the Jesuits to move St Aloysius' College from Bourke Street to a site in Kirribilli near the church in order to give regular service to the Catholics of the area.

In 1902, a property in Jeffrey Street adjoining the church owned by Dr Cox was rented for £225 and a few years later purchased for £4,500. St Aloysius' College officially commenced classes in Kirribilli on 2 February 1903, with less than 50 students.

Before long enrolments again increased and additional accommodation became an urgent need. A wooden building was hastily erected, housing classrooms and study hall until it was replaced in 1907–1908 by a three-storeyed brick building later known as the "Junior School". As student numbers increased, additional rooms again became necessary and in 1913-1914 a new wing was constructed on the eastern side of the original residence. The site has been continually developed since, with significant redevelopment occurring in 1961 and most recently over the period 1979–81.

The new building at the northern end of Jeffrey Street will be named Dalton Hall after the Founding Father of St Aloysius' College, Fr Joseph Dalton SJ. It consists of a swimming pool, basketball court, classrooms and offices.

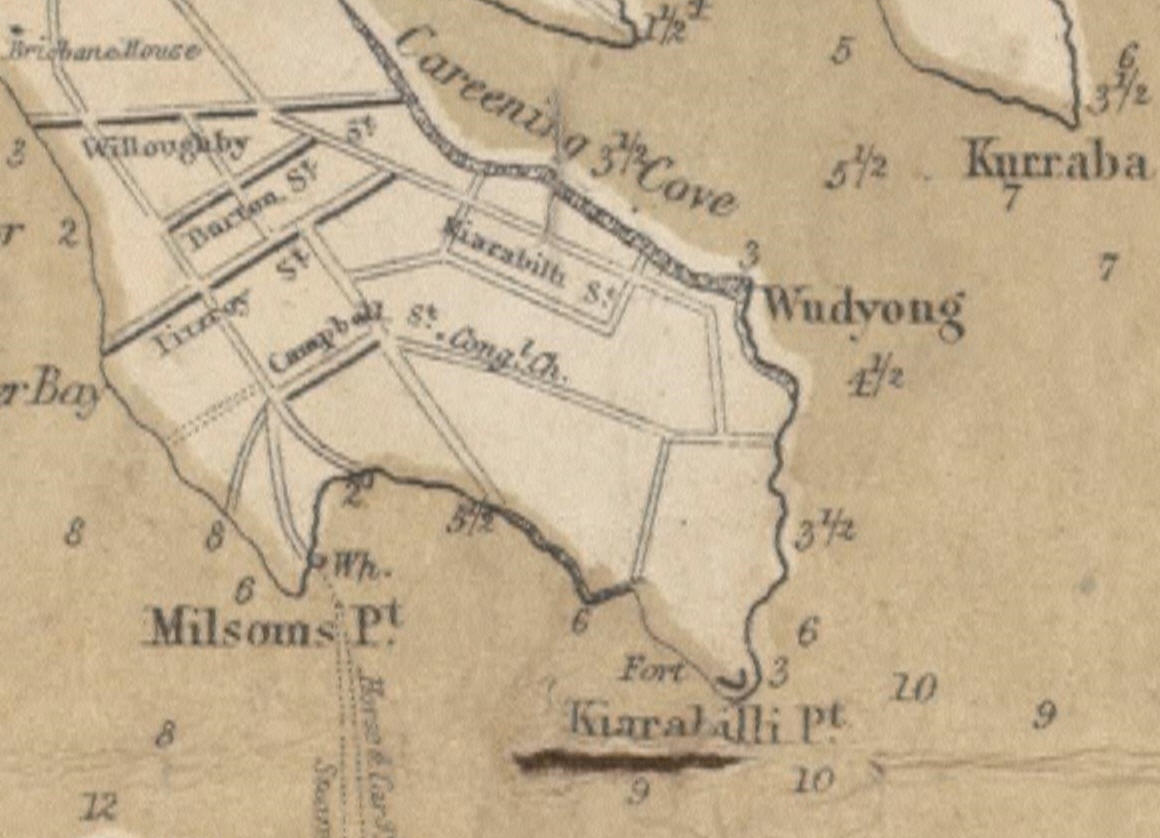
Street map of Kirribilli (1875)

=== Kirribilli Neighbourhood Centre ===
The Kirribilli Neighbourhood Centre (or KNC) was built as a private residence in 1873 by Henry Bligh and is heritage-listed on the Register of the National Estate.

The building is described on the NSW heritage database as being "designed in the Victorian Rustic Gothic style". The "Two storey symmetrical semi-detached houses of stone with a corrugated iron gabled roof. There are carved bargeboards, finials and a lancet ventillator to the gable ends, three-light square-headed windows and iron lace, columns and balustrades to the verandahs." And as being "Built 1876 for Henry Hocken Bligh (1826-1904), former Mayor of Willoughby (1869–70) and husband of Elizabeth Shairp, granddaughter of James Milson. The Blighs lived at No. 16 and owned other properties in the area. It was sold in 1911, through various ownerships until acquired by the Council in 1974. It was restored subsequently as the Kirribilli Neighbourhood Centre."

The Kirribilli Neighbourhood Centre is now run as a community neighbourhood centre by a committee governed by the North Sydney Council. The centre provides spaces for community activities and parties or celebrations. It also provides a wide range of adult education courses, holds a monthly market, and offers activities and services for all ages. Rooms with views of the Sydney Opera House and the Sydney Harbour Bridge are available for hire.

=== Bratton ===
"Bratton" which is located at 38 Pitt Street (very close to Jeffrey Street) is another significant heritage listed property in the area. It is described on the NSW heritage database as being designed in the "Victorian Italianate style". And as a "Two storey rendered brick terrace with rendered brick verandah formed as three semi-circular arches sprung from square columns between and plain rendered balustrade panels."

== Heritage ==
=== Jeffreys Street Heritage Conservation Area ===
At its meeting of 8 March 2010, North Sydney Council's Planning and Development Committee resolved to investigate the establishment of a new heritage conservation area centred on Jeffreys Street, Kirribilli.A consultant was engaged to prepare a report. A report was subsequently completed by John Oultram Heritage & Design titled Proposed Conservation Area, Jeffreys Street, Kirribilli. The consultant's assessment was then presented to Council on 29 Nov 2010 which resolved to adopt the recommendations of the Heritage Assessment and to commence the process of preparing a planning proposal to establish a new heritage conservation area centered on Jeffreys Street. The planning proposal was then presented to and adopted by Council on 21 Mar 2011 which resolved to forward the planning proposal to the Minister for Planning seeking a gateway determination under section 56 of the EP&A Act 1979. The Minister accepted the proposal and the Jeffreys Street Heritage Conservation Area was gazetted on 16 December 2011.

=== Collections ===
Relevant historical collections are recorded at the following libraries:

- Stanton Library (North Sydney Council)
- State Library of NSW
- St Aloysius' College
- National Library of Australia

== Etymology ==
=== Locality ===
Over the past 200 years the immediate area has been called by many names:

- Huntershill, the name coined by Thoman Muir
- St Leonards, the area was originally part of the Parish and Municipality of St Leonards East, early Parish maps refer
- North Sydney
- Kiarabilli, an Aboriginal word which means "good fishing spot"
- Milsons Point
- Kirribilli Point
- Kirribilli was first used in about 1853 and the use of Kirribilli as a suburb or locality is more recent.

=== Confusion over the name of the street ===
As to the confusion about the street's name, various government departments spell the name of the street in three different ways. The street has mainly been called Jeffrey Street for much of the past 150 years. Certainly, it is easier to pronounce the name of the street without the "s" on the end of Jeffrey. There are three common spelling variations as follows:

Option	Named after	Examples of usage
Jeffrey Street	Thomas Jeffrey	NSW State Government (Heritage reference to the wharf); North Sydney Council (via the MapData layer on the Council website); Various federal government agencies (e.g. Centrelink); St Aloysius' College; UBD Street Directory; Google maps; A large number of real estate agents; www.geonames.org
Jeffreys Street	Arthur Jeffreys or John Jeffreys	North Sydney Council (preferred but the North Sydney Council is internally inconsistent and in various places suggests the street is named after both these people); Yahoo maps; Geographical Names Board of NSW (but only in relation to the wharf)
Jeffereys Street	Reported to be a mistake	Sydney Ferries (Two signs on the wharf refer); 131500 Transport Infoline

The earliest map showing Jeffrey Street is contained in a book about Robert Campbell. The map refers to a Jeffreys Street.

The name Jeffrey Street was used almost exclusively from 1878 to the 1970s, for almost 100 years. A number of the early mentions are listed below. The spelling "Jeffreys Street" was not used in newspapers before 1910, and subsequent appearances were rare. For example, an Auction Sale notice for an auction that occurred on 20 July 1910 for "2 Valuable Blocks of Land" but these were rare. The name Jeffrey Street was used almost exclusively.

It is not known why North Sydney Council favoured Jeffreys Street and there is no record of the basis of the decision to adopt "Jeffreys Street" in favour of "Jeffrey Street" which occurred in about 1990. The confusion over names has often been publicised. Sydney Morning Herald article on 19 and 21 May 2010 refers.

The North Sydney Council website is internally inconsistent:

- The "Greencliffe" leaflet on the North Sydney Council website states that Jeffreys Street and the wharf are named after a "John Jeffreys". However, there is no evidence that this person ever lived.
- The "Naming North Sydney" database on the North Sydney Council website states that the street was named after "Arthur Jeffreys".

It is widely agreed that the signs on the wharf that read "Jeffereys" Street are a mistake.

To add further confusion, the Kirribilli Neighbourhood Centre which is located in the same street has recently (circa 2008) named the upstairs back room "Jeffreys" after Alice Jeffreys, "a wonderful organizer and hard worker". Alice is a volunteer organiser at the centre. It is understood that Alice is not related to Arthur and that this is purely coincidence.

=== Intersections ===
Jeffrey Street runs from Fitzroy Street in the north to Kirribilli Avenue in the south. It has only one intermediate intersection, with Pitt Street to the west and Upper Pitt Street to the east.

== News, television and film ==
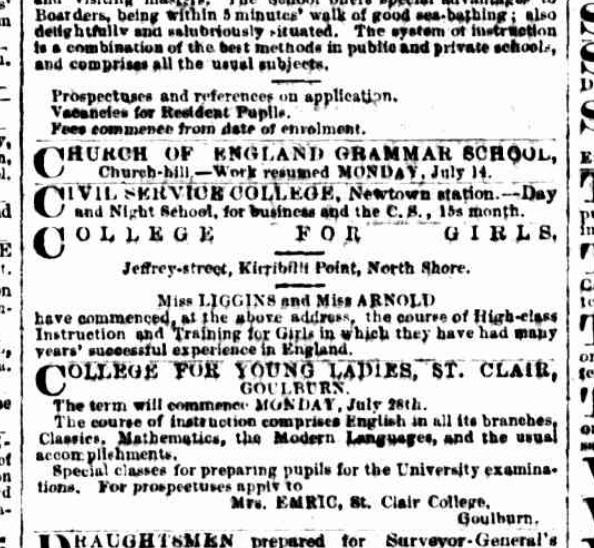
Early advertisement referring to Jeffrey Street (a "College for Girls" in 1884)

Select mentions over the years have been as follows:

Early mentions in the Sydney Morning Herald

- "Insolvent Estate". Sydney Morning Herald. 26 April 1878. for the sale by auction of the Insolvent Estate of George Thrale Kemp (the earliest reference to Jeffrey Street)
- "Lost and Found". Sydney Morning Herald. 30 April 1880. for a lost dog
- "To Let". Sydney Morning Herald. 30 September 1880. advertisement to let a family residence
- "Order of Sale". Sydney Morning Herald. 5 October 1882. for a Commodious Family Residence known as Hillside (Milson's Point)
- "Order of Sale". Sydney Morning Herald. 6 October 1882. for a Residence and a large block of land fronting the harbour known as Mrs Paul's (Milson's Point)
- "Auction Sales". Sydney Morning Herald. 28 October 1882. for an auction sale to sell all the old material in the construction of Old Kirribilli Cottage
- "Auction Sales". Sydney Morning Herald. 28 November 1882. for a valuable and beautifully situated corner site
- "Order of Sale". Sydney Morning Herald. 30 November 1883. for a splendid corner block (Milson's Point, St. Leonards)
- "Educational". Sydney Morning Herald. 26 July 1884. for a College for Girls
- describes the impact of the Sydney Harbour Tunnel which passes underneath the area.
- describes the Olympic Torch from the Wharf.

Protests

- "150 Protest against Kirribilli Plan", Sydney Morning Herald, 11/08/1993 describes a protest against adjacent development in Kirribilli Avenue.
- "Battle over foreshore flats plan", Sydney Morning Herald, 06/08/1993 which quotes the local Mayor who describes the area as "one of the most important locations in Sydney".

Brothels and gambling

- "Two-Up School", Sydney Morning Herald, 14/05/1951 describes a police raid on a two-up school where 27 people were arrested
- Use of the street for brothels during and post WW2 (Note: North Sydney Council records)

Film and television.

The views from Jeffrey Street of Sydney Harbour, the Sydney Opera House and the Sydney Harbour Bridge and the long row of heritage listed terrace houses in Jeffrey Street have been immortalised in a number of films, movies and television shows.

== Court cases ==
In 1997 John Taylor and Pam Taylor, the owners of 28 Jeffrey Street applied for Development Consent to North Sydney Council to add "Juliette balconies", a roof deck and a glass roof to their Victorian terrace house. The terrace has a 2-storey appearance from the street, 3-stories from the rear which is below street level. Consent was refused by Council. This decision was appealed to the Land and Environment Court of New South Wales. The original application had been in May 1997 and had led to five sets of plans being prepared. Objections raised included concerns related to the party wall, consent, noise, privacy, reduction in heritage integrity, light, and detrimental impact on the strong geometric shapes of the gable roofs on the terraces and their stepping down the hill. Evidence from Mrs. Worrall was that in the 1960s the area had been regarded as a slum, but the history of the area had been recognised. The Court heard evidence from neighbouring owners, architects and town planners including:

- Mrs. D. Worrall (26 Jeffrey)
- Mr. J. Skarratt (42 Kirribilli Ave)
- Mr. L. Sheridan (30 Jeffrey)

The Judgement handed down by Commissioner K.G. Hoffman stated that the Court came to the conclusion that the heritage significance of the group of terraces and that of No. 28 would be compromised to an unacceptable degree by the proposed roof deck. The court however allowed modified Juliette balconies, an attic room and a dormer window.

A 2001 Judgement in the Land and Environment Court for the Case concerning 22–28 Alfred Street, Milsons Point also referred to Jeffrey Street. This case involved a proposed development on the site occupied by five terrace houses in nearby Milsons Point. The Judgement noted that "terrace buildings are not rare and appear in large numbers elsewhere in Sydney and, in particular, in North Sydney. Better examples exist in North Sydney; for example, in Jeffrey Street, on the opposite side of Bradfield Park to the subject land".

Jeffrey Street was mentioned in the 2005 case of Meehan v. North Sydney Council which related to a nearby property at 40 Kirribilli Avenue. The judgement noted that "the area was not a conservation area, although there was discussion during the proceedings of the fact that perhaps this should be a conservation area, given the large number of heritage items in the vicinity". It also noted that the properties at No. 41–45 Pitt Street are heritage items of regional significance and the properties in Jeffrey Street are also heritage items of regional significance.

There was a series of 10 cases in the Consumer, Trader and Tenancy Tribunal of New South Wales (CTTT) relating to 40 Jeffrey Street ending in 2005. These cases involved the administration of the strata scheme at 40 Jeffrey Street. In November 2005 the owners of Lot 1 made an application to the CTTT seeking to have a compulsory strata managing agent appointed. The application was successful. This led to the resolution of a long-running dispute between the owners in the strata scheme which had involved 10 applications to the CTTT and a reported 100 to North Sydney Council.

== Footnotes and References ==
Footnotes
