= George Mealmaker =

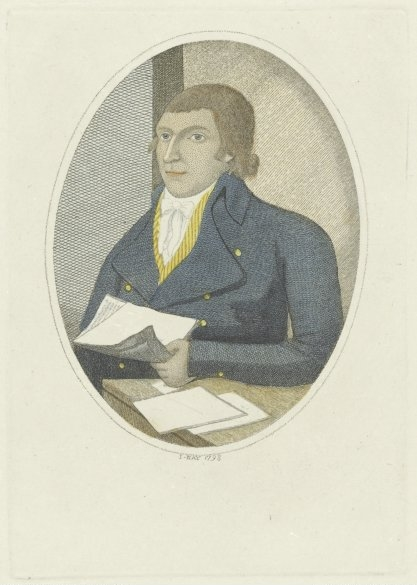
Mealmaker by John Kay.

George Mealmaker (10 February 1768 – 30 March 1808) was a Scottish radical organiser and writer, born in Dundee, Scotland. Like his father before him he was a weaver by trade.

== Liberty ==
He was born in the Seagate district of Dundee in 1768 the son of a handloom weaver and became a weaver himself around 1780.

In the late 1780s Mealmaker, along with Thomas Fyshe Palmer formed the Dundee Friends of Liberty group, Mealmaker becoming head of the group from 1796. In 1793 Mealmaker wrote Dundee Address to the Friends of Liberty in which he criticised the British government, for which Palmer was arrested as being the writer. Despite Mealmaker admitting that it was he, and not Palmer who had written the pamphlet the court found Palmer guilty on the grounds that he had prepared the text for publication and circulated it, and sentenced him to 14 years penal transportation.

Other persons arrested in relations to the political activities of the Edinburgh Society of the Friends of the People and associated groups like The Dundee Friends of Liberty were Thomas Muir, William Skirving, Maurice Margarot and Joseph Gerrald. These five were transported to Australia in 1794 and 1795 and were collectively known as the Scottish Martyrs to Liberty.

== Transported ==
Mealmaker continued his radical activities and became involved in the Society of the United Scotsmen. He continued to write treatises critical of the government and in 1797 he wrote The Moral and Political Catechism of Man for which he was arrested. Tried at the High Court of Justiciary in Edinburgh by David Rae, Lord Eskgrove on 10/11 January 1798 for sedition and found guilty, he was transported for 14 years to Australia.

This ended a short married life with Marjory Thoms (died c. 1843) of Dundee, whom he had married in 1795 and by whom he had two daughters.

Mealmaker's skills were needed in the colony, and he was put in charge of a weaving factory in Parramatta by Governor King. For several years he did well, and was granted a conditional pardon and other rewards. The next Governor, William Bligh, did not place the same value on developing weaving, a fire partly destroyed the factory in 1807, and Mealmaker died destitute in 1808, of alcoholic suffocation.

== Outlook ==
Mealmaker's "political ideology and outlook, which were formed from an amalgam of Paineite republicanism, radical Presbyterianism, and a commitment to religious freedom and democratic parliamentary reform, distanced him from the mainstream of Scottish radicalism of this period."

== See also ==
- List of convicts transported to Australia
