= John Baxter (political reformer) =

English silversmith

- Born: 17 August 1756; Shoreditch, London, England
- Occupations: Silversmith; writer; political activist
- Known for: Chairman of the London Corresponding Society
- Spouse: Mary Adams

John Baxter (1756 – 1845?), was a radical British writer and silversmith, living in St Leonards parish, Shoreditch during the 1790s and until at least 1817. He is noteworthy as chairman of the London Corresponding Society in 1794 and as one of the twelve indicted during the 1794 Treason Trials. He also compiled and published ‘’A new and impartial history of England’’ in 1796.

== Early life ==
John Baxter was the son of Samuel and Elizabeth Baxter, born 17 August 1756 and christened 5 September 1756 at St. Leonard's, Shoreditch. He married Mary Adams 2 September 1776 at the same church, and is usually described as a silversmith. Before his involvement with the London Corresponding Society, he was thrown out of a vestry meeting in Shoreditch and assaulted for doubting "the existence of persons who were Levellers, or who wished to convert England into a Republic." "Seeing he could not resist, he put his hand into his pocket, and pulled out many of the society's addresses, and threw them with a great deal of exultation among the people there." His assailants accused him of High Treason, but Magistrates rejected the charge. They then indicted him for a libel, which was also rejected so he was eventually charged with causing a riot. No further details of the case are known, but one of the accounts of the incident states that Baxter was "scarcely three feet and a half high", so he may have suffered from dwarfism.

== London Corresponding Society ==
Baxter became the Chairman of the London Corresponding Society following the arrest of Maurice Margarot in 1793 and his subsequent transportation to Botany Bay. Baxter was then described as a journeyman silversmith living in the parish of St Leonards, Shoreditch. In November 1793 he was responsible for drawing up addresses to 'the friends of peace and parliamentary reform' and to 'His Majesty' calling for an end to the war against France, together with Thomas Hardy, the Secretary.

In June 1794 he was arrested and indicted for High Treason during the 1794 Treason Trials. One of the prosecution witnesses in the trial of Thomas Hardy claimed that Baxter had said 'there is not a man in the Society who believes that a Parliamentary Reform is all we want; and without having recourse to the sanguinary measures of the French Revolution, may be brought about in a few hours. He did not wish the King or any of the Royal Family to be killed. They may be sent to Hanover; but at the fame time some blood must unavoidably be shed, on account of the insults offered to the people, which human nature could not bear.'. However, following the acquittals of Hardy, John Horne Tooke, and John Thelwall, the authorities took no further action and he was released in the December. During the period of his imprisonment, Baxter's wife received various payments from the London Corresponding Society.

== Friends of Liberty ==
In March 1795 the bookseller Joseph Burks and Baxter broke away from the London Corresponding Society to form ‘The Friends of Liberty’, of which Baxter became president. Williams suggests that the new group was ‘probably more anarchist’ than the remainder of the London Corresponding Society, but Goodwin questions this arguing that Baxter took ‘a realistic rather than a revolutionary attitude.’

In November 1795, Baxter gave and later published a lecture entitled Resistance to oppression, the constitutional right of Britons asserted, where he ascribed much of the current distress among the poor to the ‘Pride and Luxury of the Great’, but made it clear that he was not advocating 'the opposition of Force to Force'.

== A new and impartial history of England ==
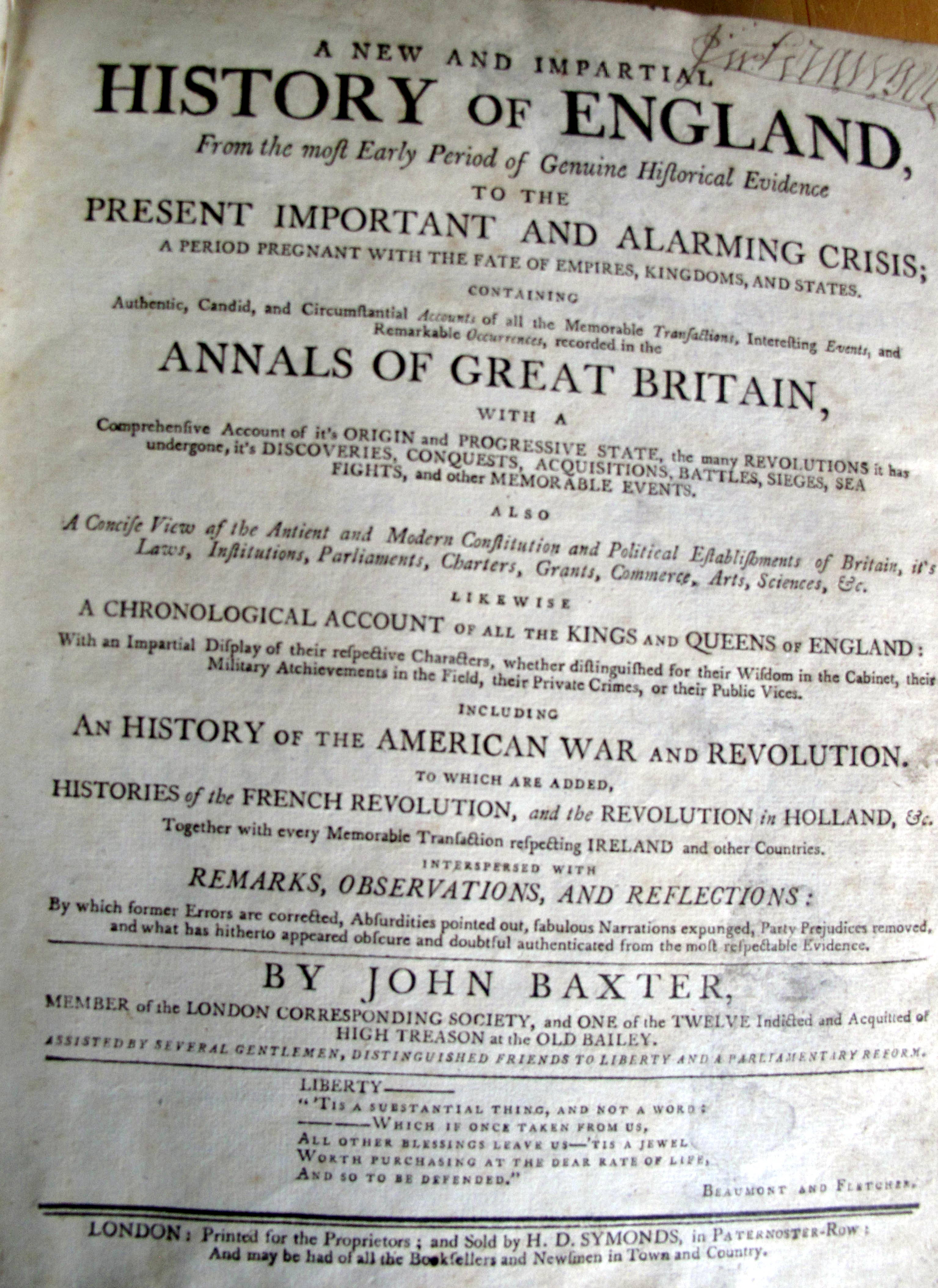
Title page of Baxter's History of England, 1796

In February 1796 Baxter circulated proposals for A new and impartial history of England written by him and ‘assisted by several gentlemen, distinguished friends to liberty and a Parliamentary reform’. The work was dedicated to the London Corresponding Society, 'to the numerous Political Societies in Great-Britain and to the people at large. It was published in weekly parts during 1796 and early 1797. This work was intended as an antidote to David Hume's history, to provide Englishmen with 'a perpetual memento of their rights and privileges.' Baxter's motives for the publication are set out in his preface. 'We are the more convinced of the propriety and absolute necessity of such an undertaking at this time, because we have seen persons in authority making considerable incroachments on the liberties of the people, and under false or frivolous accusations shutting men up in prison, and attempting their lives, because they had virtue enough to oppose their arbitrary measures.'

The first thirty-three numbers (to 1689) were largely an abridgement and plagiarism of Hume, although with revised interpretations of certain key political events such as Magna Carta, or the Glorious Revolution. The remaining 17 numbers, covering the periods of the Whig supremacy, the American and French Revolutions were Baxter's and his collaborators' own work and brought the story up to date. Baxter has been criticised for not acknowledging Hume's large contribution in his preface, and only mentioning him in the text in order to criticise his interpretations. Nevertheless, Thomas Jefferson unsuccessfully attempted to persuade American publishers to reprint Baxter's work as a 'republican' alternative to Hume's 'Tory' history for use in American universities.

== Later life ==
Over the next twenty years, Baxter's name crops up among other radicals in London in a variety of official records and reports from government spies. Thus in 1798 he was a member of a debating society and in 1799 he was arrested with members of the United Irishmen during a raid on the ‘Nags Head’ public house. He was noted attending Margarot's funeral in 1815 and in the following year was listed on the satirical broadside ‘’The polemical fleet’’ where he was given the nickname ‘Impregnable’. In 1817 he was involved in organising political discussion groups at the Mulberry Tree public house. He was, perhaps, the John Baxter who died at Shoreditch during the last quarter of 1845.
