= Basil William Douglas =

Scottish radical

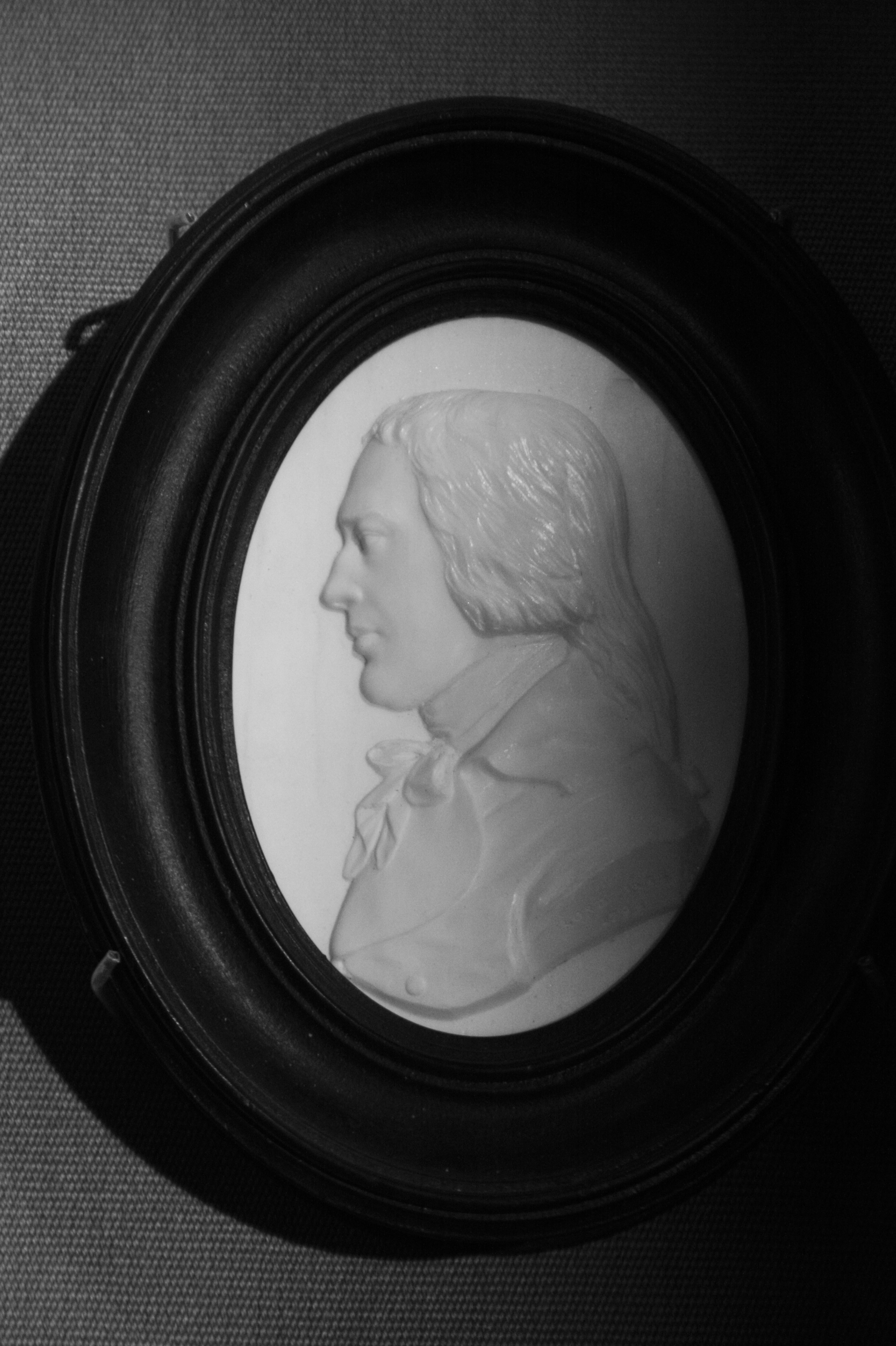
Cameo of Basil William Douglas, Lord Daer

Basil William Douglas, Lord Daer FRSE (1763-1794) was a Scottish nobleman who, in his short life, developed a reputation as an agricultural improver and an advocate of parliamentary reform. He was an active member of, among other radical societies, the "Friends of the People". He is one of the small group of people to whom Robert Burns dedicated poetry.

== Early life ==
He was the second son of Helen Hamilton and Dunbar Douglas, 4th Earl of Selkirk. Despite the death of his parents' first son in infancy, Douglas did not become Earl as he died before his father. He was educated at the University of Edinburgh. While studying lodged with his teacher moral philosopher Dugald Stewart, one of the most important figures of the later Scottish Enlightenment, and a renowned populariser of the work of Francis Hutcheson and Adam Smith.

In 1785 (soon after its inception in 1783) Daer was elected a Fellow of the Royal Society of Edinburgh. His proposers were Dugald Stewart, James Gregory, and John Walker.

In 1786 he travelled with Dugald Stewart to his country house at Catrine in Ayrshire, and there, on 23 October, he was introduced to Robert Burns, Burns' first meeting with nobility. Burns wrote of this event (of which there is engraving):

"Nae honest, worthy man need care,
To meet with noble, youthful Daer
For he but meets a brother"

== Radical political engagement ==
Daer broadly shared Burns's democratic sympathies. Returning in 1789 from a visit to early revolutionary France, he became a concurrent member of three associations dedicated to representative, parliamentary reform, and an important link between them: the learned Society for Constitutional Information and the more artisanal and radical London Corresponding Society and the Friends of the People Society in Scotland.

Though a strong critic of the English-Scottish union of 1707, Daer called for English and Scottish radical societies to work together 'to have mutually beneficial results: providing Scots with greater say in government while relieving you of that vermin from this country who infect your court, parliament and every establishment". At the national Convention of reform societies held in Edinburgh in December 1792 he clashed with Thomas Muir of the Friends of the People over his presentation of an address from the United Irishmen. The address (largely drawn up by William Drennan) was made acceptable to Daer and to the Convention only by redacting any suggestion of "Treason or Misprison of Treason against the Union [of Scotland] with England".

Daer's political career, however, was cut short when he died, unmarried, from tuberculosis on 5 November 1794 at Ivybridge, Devon; he was buried in Exeter Cathedral. On his death the title of Lord Daer passed to his younger brother Thomas Douglas who soon became the 5th Earl of Selkirk.
