= John Binns (journalist) =

Irish nationalist, later American journalist (1772–1860)

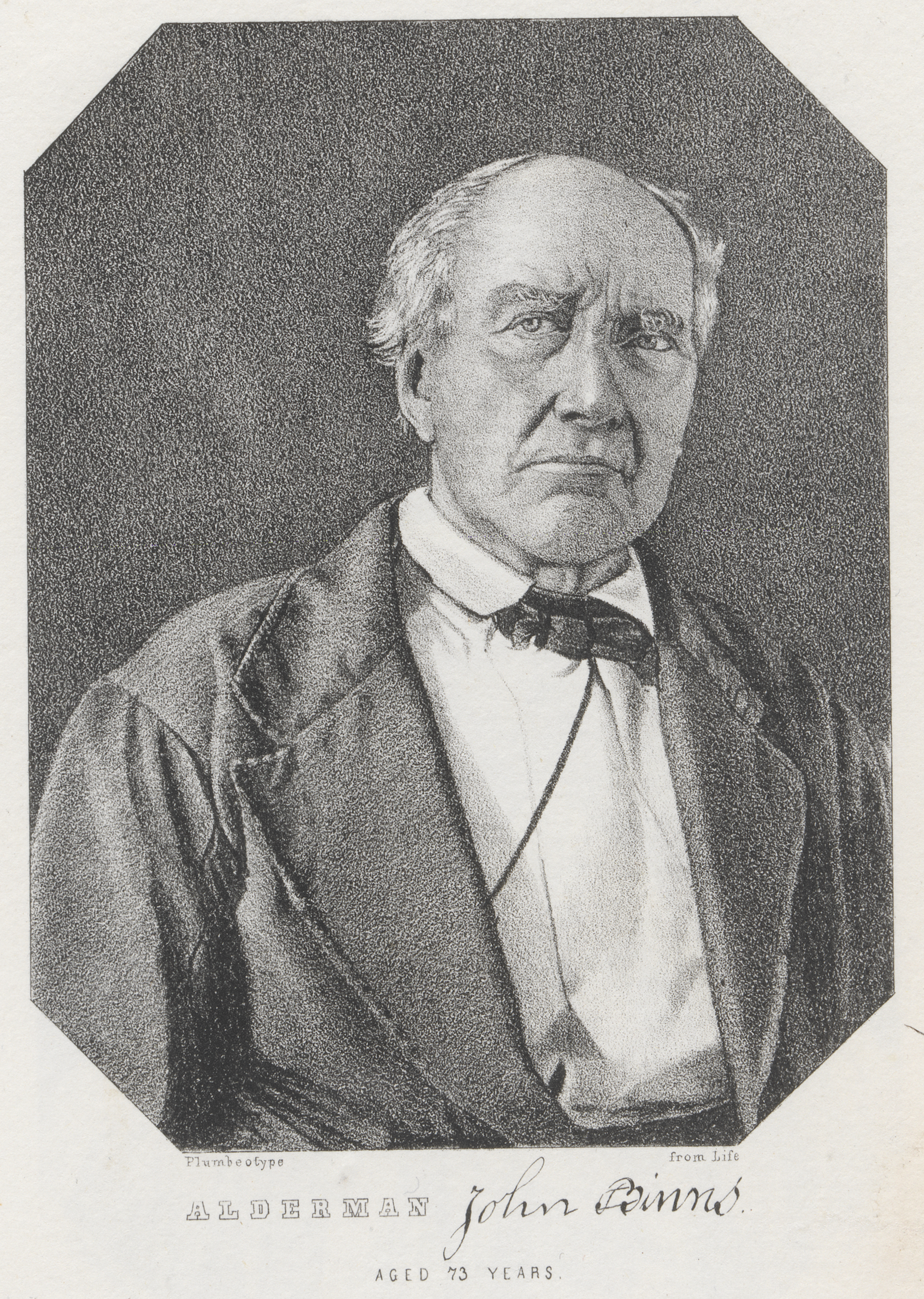
John Binns by John Plumbe Jr., 1847

John Binns (22 December 1772 – 16 June 1860) was a Dublin-born American journalist, the son of ironmonger John Binns (who died in a shipwreck aged about 30 in 1774) and his wife Mary Pemberton. A grand-nephew of Irish Patriot politician and member of Dublin Corporation John Binns, he and his older brother Benjamin moved to London and became involved with city's federation of democratic clubs, the London Corresponding Society (LCS). Rising to the society's executive council and chairing its general committee in 1795, Binns pressed the society to mobilise mass support to achieve parliamentary reform (he would later state that revolution was his true object).

In October 1795, with William Duane, Binns chaired a “monster meeting" at which crowds estimated at upwards of 200,000 heard Binns and veteran reformers Joseph Priestley, Charles James Fox, and John Thelwall call for an end to the war with the French Republic, and for universal manhood suffrage and annual parliaments. Three days later, George III, in procession to the state Opening of Parliament, had the windows of his carriage smashed by a crowd shouting "No King, No Pitt, No war", and was fired at with a dart (the Popgun Plot). The government seized on the occasion to introduce the Seditious Meetings Act and the Treason Act. Together with the encouragement given to magistrates to use their public order powers, the Two Acts effectively muzzled the Society's activities.

In 1797, Binns and his brother joined the executive committee of the United Britons, an initiative that sought to bring radical democratic societies in England and Scotland together in a revolutionary alliance with the United Irishmen and the French Directory. In January 1798, he was detained on returning with a United Britons delegation to Dublin, and was arrested again in February at Margate while seeking to arrange passage for a delegation to France. Found in the company of the United Irish agent James Coigly, who was carrying an incriminating address to the Directory, he was tried for, but acquitted of, treason. Coigly, who had refused an offer from John Binns to take responsibility for the address, was hanged. In March 1799, while attempting in the wake of the defeated rebellion in Ireland to revive the United network, he was again detained. Released in March 1801, he accepted American exile.

After a brief residence in New York and encounter with a Society of Theophilanthropists, he moved in with a community of radical émigrés (Joseph Priestley among them) in Northumberland, Pennsylvania. In March 1802, he founded a newspaper, the Republican Argus. Under its banner strapline, "persons not property should ever be the basis of representation", it called for the democratic reform of the Pennsylvania state constitution. It also advocated U.S. territorial expansion, including the annexation of Canada.

In March 1807, Binns moved to Philadelphia where, as editor of the Democratic Press, he found himself in a print war with his fellow LCS veteran, William Duane, since 1798 editor of the equally radical Aurora. Binns, was a trusted advisor to Pennsylvania Governor Simon Snyder. Snyder's administration endorsed aggressive federal activities, and in its patronage was seen to neglect the Old School Democrats of whom Duane was an acknowledged leader. The resulting feud served to split Thomas Jefferson's Democratic Republican coalition and to embolden nativist attacks on "foreign extremists".

During the War of 1812, Binns served Governor Snyder as ADC, and the Democratic Press rode a wave of patriotic anti-British sentiment. But in the late 1820s, it lost readership and influence as a result of its attacks on the populism of Andrew Jackson. Denouncing Jackson as a corrupt demagogue and murderer (holding him culpable for the deaths of six fellow militiamen in 1812), Binns supported the Whigs with whom he repudiated attempts "to array the poorer, against the richer, portions of our population". The Democratic Press ceased publication in 1829.

During the nullification crisis of 1832, Binns proposed that the federal government should buy the freedom of slaves, and that the freed slaves be “returned" to Africa. An owner of some slaves himself, Binns responded to the ardent abolitionsim of Daniel O'Connell, the "Emancipator" of Catholic Ireland, by arguing that Irish-Americans were wise to avoid the issue of slavery. This was the position of the Archbishop John Hughes of New York who, in 1841, urged Irish Americans not to sign O'Connell's abolitionist petition ("An Address of the People of Ireland to their Countrymen and Countrywomen in America") lest they further inflame anti-Irish nativist sentiment. Through the 1840s, Binns defended the Irish community in Philadelphia from nativist attacks, and from the mid-1850s from the Orangeism of the Know-Nothing party.

Binns published a manual of Pennsylvania law, Binn's Justice, in 1840, of which the eleventh and final edition was issued in 1912. Assisted with material by the Young Irelander, Thomas D”Arcy McGee, in 1852 Binns produced his History of the Irish settlers in America (1852).

In 1806, Binns had married Mary Anne Bagster, in the Church of the United Brethren; they had ten children. He died in Philadelphia 16 June 1860.
