= William Skirving =

Scottish Martyrs (c. 1745 – 1796)

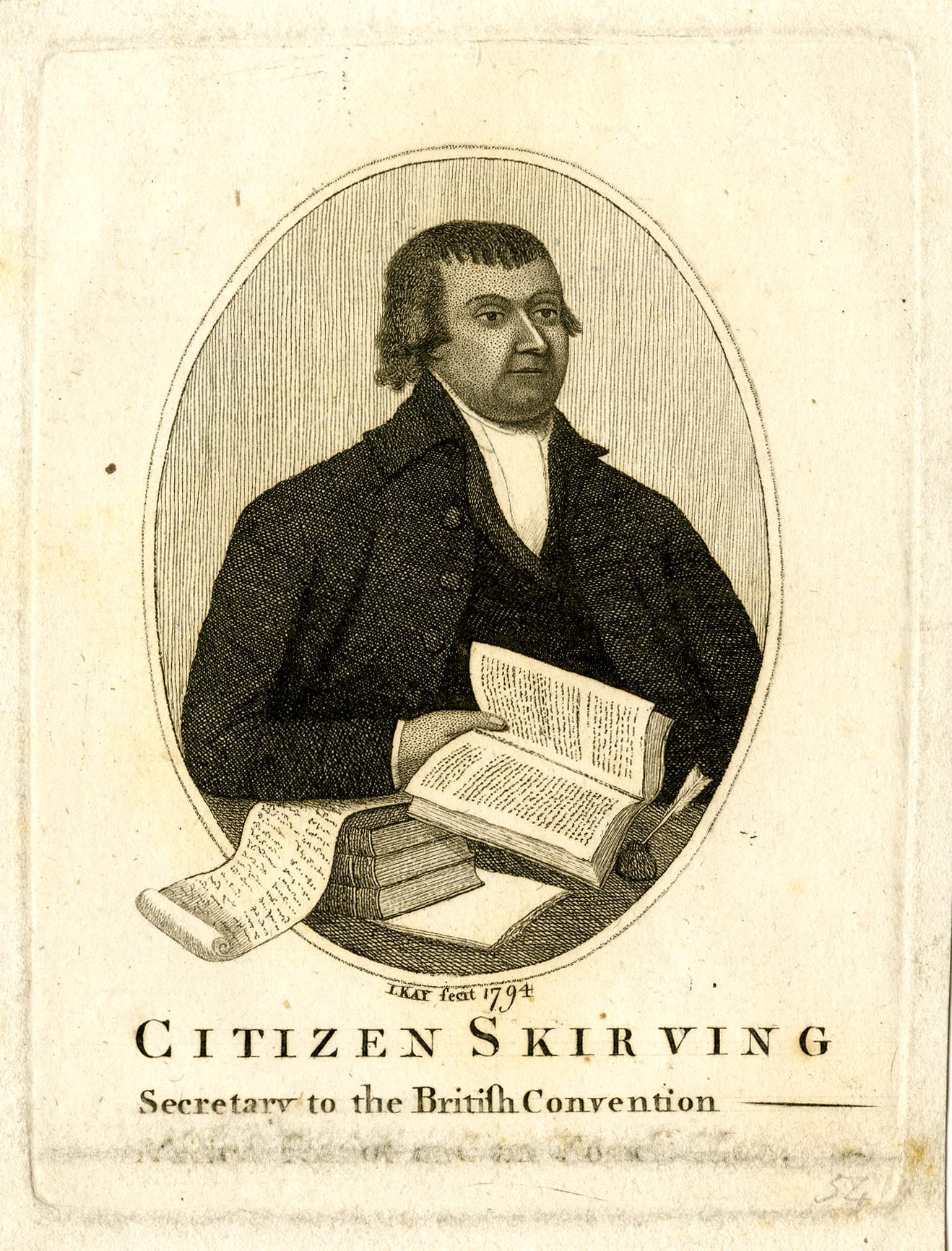
Citizen Skirving, Secretary to the British Convention. A tried patriot and an honest man

William Skirving (c. 1745 – 1796) was one of the five Scottish Martyrs for Liberty. Active in the cause of universal franchise and other reforms inspired by the French Revolution, they were convicted of sedition in 1793–94, and sentenced to transportation to New South Wales.

== Early life and farming ==
William Skirving was born about 1745 in Liberton, near Edinburgh to William Skirving, a farmer, and his wife (probably Margaret, née Bryden). He was educated at Haddington grammar school and at Edinburgh University, originally with a view to the ministry in the Burgher Secession Church (a branch of Presbyterianism). On graduation he studied divinity for a short time before changing direction and taking up a position as a tutor in a private household, and then leasing land to farm at Damhead. In 1775 he married Rachel Abercrombie (b. 1748) the only child of Andrew Abercrombie, who had been a farmer and merchant in Fife. William set about farming in Strathruddy, Fife, on land Rachel had inherited from her father. In the same year, William's father passed on to him some of his tacks (leased lands), and in the following year William senior died. William and Rachel had two sons William (b. 1779) and Alexander (b. 1782). In 1792 he moved to Edinburgh and published a manual of husbandry. He had hopes of obtaining the Chair in Agriculture at Edinburgh University but was unsuccessful.

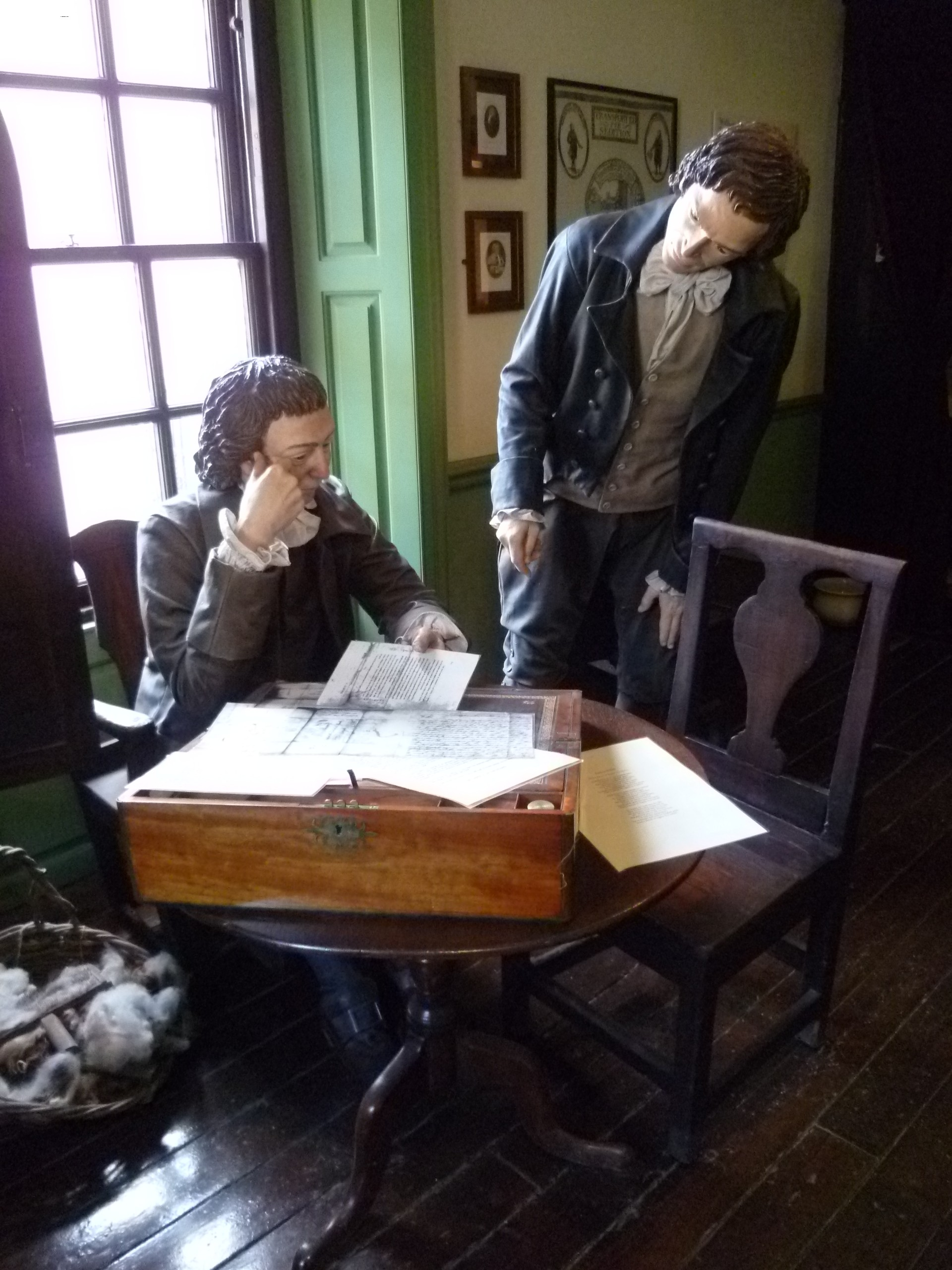
William Skirving (left) tableau in the Abbot House, Dunfermline

== A Friend of the People ==
In 1792 he also became active in setting up the Edinburgh Society of Friends of the People an organisation of Radical Whigs and other reformers inspired by the ideals of the French Revolution. In December 1792, when the Edinburgh Society held its first political convention, he was appointed general secretary to the convention. At that time, the only precedents for such conventions were in the French and American Revolutions. The Friends of the People called for universal suffrage, annual elections and were seeking to make contact with like-minded groups such as the United Irishmen. Although the Society made a point of saying that they were not advocating riot, revolution or republicanism, but wanted to work for Parliamentary change, their ideas were nonetheless highly threatening to the first Pitt ministry, which had managed to resist much more moderate changes supported by more radical Whigs. Thomas Muir, a young lawyer who was Vice President to the Convention, and the voice of the radical faction, was charged with sedition, partly on the grounds of reading aloud an address from a representative of the United Irishmen. When the next convention was held, the Reverend Thomas Fyshe Palmer who had taken on Muir's role, was arrested. The charge against him was preparing for publication and circulating a pamphlet written by George Mealmaker. William Skirving remained as secretary through these arrests and arranged for the publication an account of the trial of Thomas Fyshe Palmer.

By the third convention, Whig members of Parliament, lawyers and other upper middle class supporters had abandoned the Societies in fear, in both Edinburgh and London. The third convention was made a national convention and attended by representatives from the English societies for Friends of the People, as well as members of the Corresponding societies. This created a more radical atmosphere, with the representatives adopting the title Citizen, and so on. Despite the rhetoric, it was clear that the Government was successfully crushing the Friends of the People and at the same time forestalling once again any of the much more moderate reforms to entrenched privilege which had been advocated by the Whigs (and which would benefit Whigs electorally). At this convention, Frenchman Maurice Margarot, the President of the London Corresponding Society, Englishman Joseph Gerrald, and Skirving were arrested. This convention was considered incendiary by authorities because of its goals of universal suffrage and annual parliaments. Skirving was charged with circulating the seditious pamphlet that Fyshe Palmer had prepared for publication and with organising seditious associations and meetings (through his role as secretary). After a trial on 6–7 January he was sentenced to fourteen years transportation.

== On board the convict transport ==
William Skirving spent about a month in Newgate Prison and in February was sent on board the convict transport Surprize with Fyshe Palmer, Margarot and Muir. (Gerrald remained in prison and was sent out on a later ship). They remained waiting on board the Surprize until it sailed in May. They were all allowed to purchase cabin space and other amenities for the voyage. Margarot's wife accompanied him to New South Wales, at the government's expense. Some associates of Fyshe Palmer travelled on the ship as free settlers.

During the voyage, the vessel's master Captain Campbell claimed that he had detected a plot for murder and mutiny with the aim of sailing to France and that Fyshe Palmer and Skirving were ringleaders. The source for this claim was information provided by this ships' superintendent of convicts William Baker, a former marine who had taken a strong dislike to the four Scotsmen. By contrast, Campbell praised Margarot, and Fyshe Palmer claimed that Margarot had been influenced to give false testimony. Campbell ordered Fyshe Palmer and Skirving to be confined together in a small cabin without any of the amenities they had paid for and minus their personal effects. Ordinary convicts accused of being part of this conspiracy were flogged and kept in chains.

Skirving and Fyshe Palmer wrote to the Governor of New South Wales protesting their innocence and accusing Captain Campbell of conspiring against them. The whole matter was dropped on arrival: no charges were laid against Fyshe Palmer and Skirving, or against Campbell. Fyshe Palmer wrote an account of the voyage which was taken back to England by the colony's surgeon John White and prepared for publication by Palmer's friend Jeremiah Joyce.

== Life and death in New South Wales ==
In New South Wales the men were treated as gentlemen convicts and political exiles and each given their own cottage. Skirving's was close to the eastern bank of the Tank Stream and adjoined Fyshe Palmer's and Muir's. Funds supplied by supporters to make them independent had made this possible, as anybody who drew on Government stores was liable to provide labour. The Governor had been instructed to give the Martyrs a fairly free rein and specifically asked to avoid discovering ‘seditious’ books which they were not supposed to take with them. A biographer of surgeon George Bass suggests that the Martyrs would have been in close company and held many discussions about their cause, probably with interested or sympathetic others, such as Bass, present. However, Judge-Advocate David Collins stated that 'in this settlement his [Skirving's] political principles never evinced themselves, but all his solicitude seemed to be to evince himself the friend of human nature' which suggests that he kept his own council, at least with those outside his circle.

Skirving acquired pieces of land from various people to put together a holding of about 100 acres (0.40 km^{2}) at Petershem where he applied himself with vigor to farming. According to Collins, he was disappointed that expected remittances from supporters in Britain did not arrive, leaving him with some debts, and he was unsuccessful in his farming efforts. He became homesick for wife and family, and his health declined. He suffered a bout of yellow fever around January 1796 and died of dysentery in March.

== Monuments ==
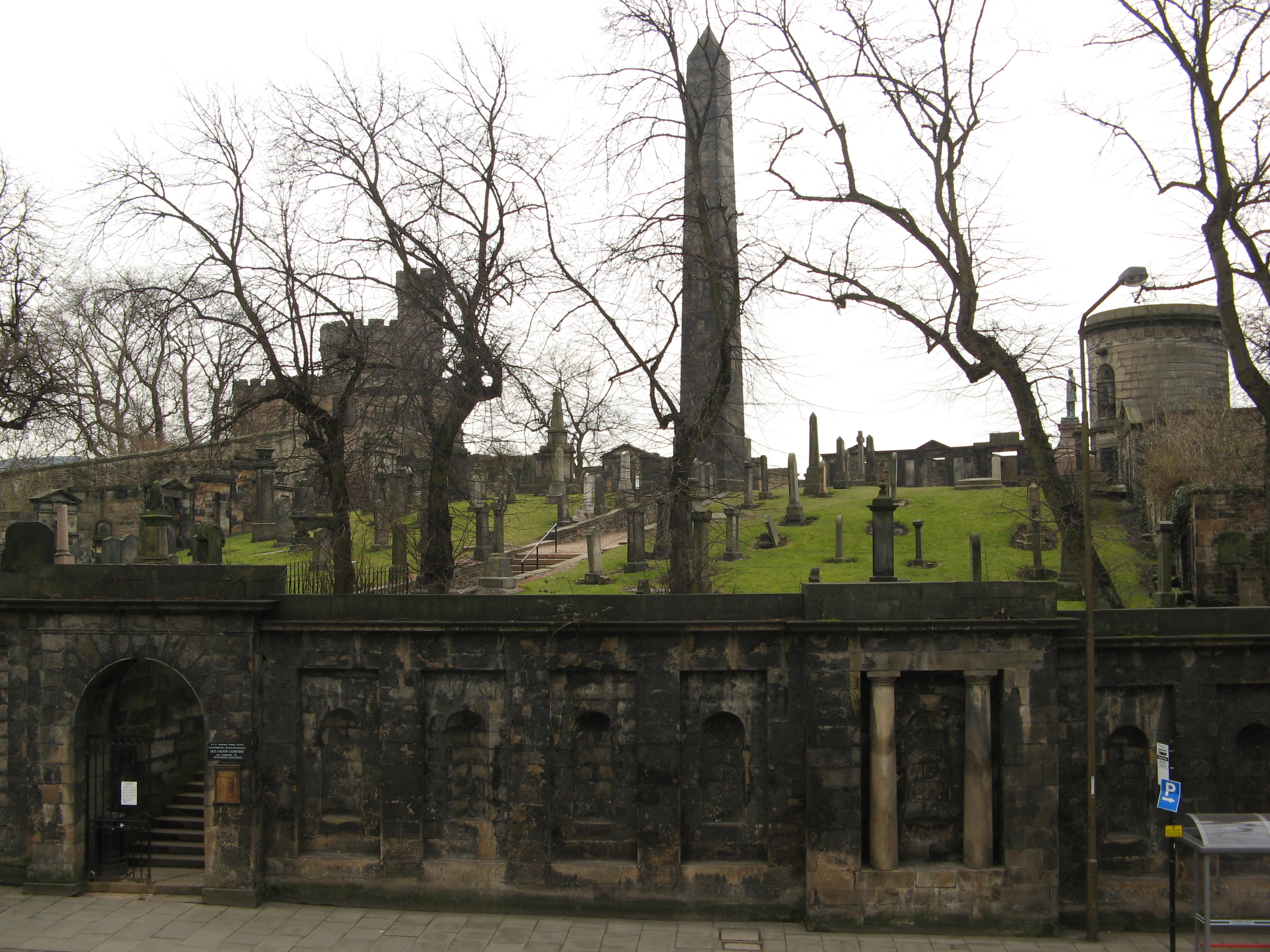
The Martyrs Monument at Old Calton in Edinburgh

The cause of Parliamentary Reform in the sense of elimination of 'rotten boroughs' (with very small number of electors) and introducing new electorates to cover the new, large cities, was ultimately successful after pro-reform Whigs won a majority in the elections of 1831. In the more liberal atmosphere memories of the Scottish Martyrs were revived. In 1837 the Scottish Radical MP Joseph Hume suggested that twin memorials be built for the Scottish Martyrs in Edinburgh and London, and subscriptions began to be collected. He laid the first stone of the Edinburgh monument in 1844 and of the British monument in 1852. Hume was at the time the main Parliamentary supporter of universal suffrage. The plaque on the Edinburgh memorial reads that the monument was erected 'by the Friends of Parliamentary Reform'. The Edinburgh memorial is a tall obelisk in the Old Calton Cemetery while the London memorial is a 33 ft (10 m) high obelisk in Nungate cemetery.

== See also ==
- List of convicts transported to Australia
