= London Corresponding Society =

Late 18th-century British parliamentary reform organization

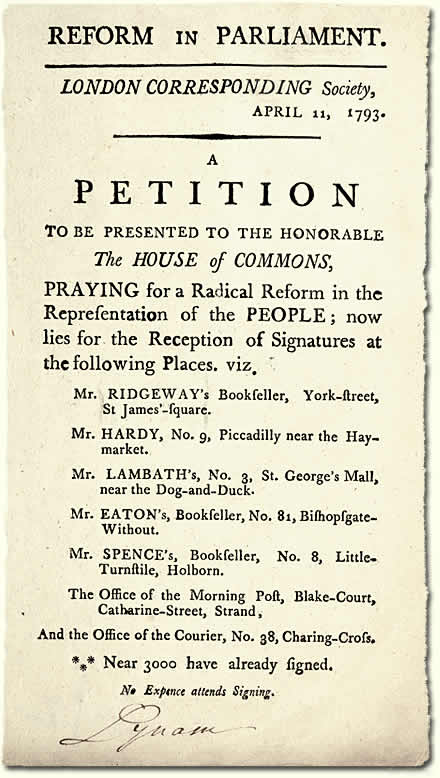
- London Corresponding Society handbill, 1793
- Formation: 25 January 1792
- Headquarters: London
- Key people: Thomas Hardy, Joseph Gerrald, Maurice Margarot, Edward Despard

The London Corresponding Society (LCS) was a federation of local reading and debating clubs that in the decade following the French Revolution agitated for the democratic reform of the British Parliament. In contrast to other reform associations of the period, it drew largely upon working men (artisans, tradesmen, and shopkeepers) and was itself organised on a formal democratic basis. At its height of its popularity in late 1795, the Society had upwards of 5,000 subscribing members, and was able to broadcast its demands for universal (male) suffrage and annual parliaments to meetings and rallies attended by tens of thousands of unenfranchised working people.

Characterising it as an instrument of French revolutionary subversion, and citing links to the insurrectionist United Irishmen, the government of William Pitt the Younger sought to break the Society, twice charging leading members with complicity in plots to assassinate the King. Measures against the society intensified in the wake of the naval mutinies of 1797, the 1798 Irish Rebellion and growing protest against the continuation of the war with France. In 1799, new legislation suppressed the Society by name, along with the remnants of the United Irishmen and their franchise organisations, United Scotsmen and the United Englishmen, with which the diminishing membership of the LCS had associated.

== Early influences and foundation of the society ==
In the last decades of the 18th century the percolation of Enlightenment thinking and the dramas of American independence and the French Revolution stimulated in Britain, as elsewhere in Europe, new clubs and societies committed to principles of popular sovereignty and constitutional government. In the north of England the Non-Conformist, principally Unitarian, currents in the new disenfranchised mill towns and manufacturing centres, supported the Society for Constitutional Information (SCI). This had been founded by, among others, Major John Cartwright, author of Take Your Choice (1776) which called for manhood suffrage, the secret ballot, annual elections and equal electoral districts.

In 1788, prominent Unitarian members of the SCI, Richard Price and Joseph Priestley among them, formed the Revolution Society. Ostensibly convened to commemorate the centennial of the Glorious Revolution of 1688, the society called for the repeal of the Corporation Act 1661 and Test Act 1673 on the grounds that "the right of private judgement, liberty of conscience, trial by jury, freedom of the press and freedom of election ought ever to be held sacred and inviolable". After 1792 the radical momentum shifted from the Revolution Society back to the SCI and, more decidedly, to a new London society.

During the American Revolutionary War, Thomas Hardy, a Scottish shoemaker in London, was convinced of the American cause by the pamphlets of Dr. Richard Price, a Unitarian minister and prominent reformer. A gift of the pamphlet library of the SCI, including a reprint of a proposal from a "Correspondence Committee" of the Irish Volunteer movement to restore "the purity and vigour" of the Irish constitution through parliamentary reform, helped persuade him of the need for a workingman's reform club.

At the first meeting of his "Correspondence Society" on 25 January 1792, Hardy led seven friends in a discussion that determined that "gross ignorance and prejudice in the bulk of the nation was the greatest obstacle to obtaining redress" from the "defects and abuses that have crept into the administration of our Government"; and that to remove that obstacle it should be the aim of those subscribing:

to instil into [the public] in a legal and constitutional way by means of the press, a sense of their rights as freemen, and of their duty to themselves and their posterity, as good citizens, and hereditary guardians of the liberties transmitted to them by their forefathers.

Hardy is said to have been distinguished in radical company by never speaking "but to the purpose at hand" and by his "high organising ability".

In promoting the new society, Hardy and his friends rode a wave of popular political engagement lifted by the two-part publication (March 1791, February 1792) of Thomas Paine's Rights of Man. Selling as many as a million copies, Paine's reply to Edmund Burke in defence of the French Revolution (and of Dr. Richard Price) was "eagerly read by reformers, Protestant dissenters, democrats, London craftsman, and the skilled factory-hands of the new industrial north".

== Organisation and membership ==
=== Democratic structure ===
From the beginning, the LCS was viewed with suspicion by the British government, and was infiltrated by spies on the government payroll. In addition to domestic subversion, the state authorities feared collaboration with French agents, against whose entry and circulation within the country they had introduced the Aliens Act 1793. Partly in response to the surveillance, and in express "imitation of the societies in and about Sheffield" whose cutlers had repudiated deference to Whig constitutionalists, the society adopted a decentralised, democratic structure. The LCS organised in "divisions" each comprising neighbourhood "tithings" of not more than ten members. Each division met twice a week to conduct business and discuss historical and political texts.

In contrast to some of Whig-establishment reform clubs, the organisation allowed all subscribers to participate in open debate, and to elect members to leadership positions such as tithing-man, divisional secretary, sub-delegate, or delegate. Rules also ensured that discussion was not monopolised. Francis Place recalled that "no one could speak a second time [on a subject] until every one who chose had spoken once".

The LCS issued its first public statement in April 1792. In addition to Sheffield (the "Faubourg Saint Antoine to an English Revolution") sister societies existed, or by 1793 had sprung to life, in Manchester, Norwich, and Stockport.

=== Social composition ===
By May 1792 the LCS comprised nine separate divisions, each with a minimum of thirty members. The height of its popularity in late 1795 it may have had between 3,500 and 5000 member organised in 79 divisions In contrast to the SCI with its annual 4 guinea subscription, in levying just a penny a week the LCS opened its proceedings to workers of almost every condition. Those, however, who as independent tradesmen were not subject to the political disapproval of employers took the leading role. They were the committeemen.

[John] Ashley, a shoemaker, [John] Baxter, a journeyman silvermith; [John] Binns, a plumber, John Boyne, a Holborn bookseller, Alexander Galloway, a mathematical machine- maker . . ., Thomas Evans, a colourer of prints and (later) a patent brace-maker, Richard Hodgson, a master hatter, John Lovett, a hairdresser, [John] Luffman, a goldsmith, [John] Oxlade, a master book-binder ...

While the LCS remained primarily a forum for "a politically conscious and articulate artisan population", men of a more prominent social and professional standing did join, drawn in many cases from existing debating societies. They brought with them important political connections and skills. Barristers such as Felix Vaughan and attorneys like Joseph Gerrald (who had practiced law in Philadelphia, and there associated with Paine) were especially useful given near continuous entanglement of members in court proceedings. Among the physicians were SCI member James Parkinson, a prolific propagandist, and John Gale Jones, an accomplished orator. But the Society's egalitarian constitution accorded them no definitive preference. Hardy in particular was wary of placing them in positions of authority lest ordinary members be discouraged from "exerting themselves in their own cause".

=== Male fraternity ===
Women participated in some of popular debating societies from which the LCS recruited. For short periods they created their own, bringing to public notice demands for equal education, equal rights and protection of female occupations. While it counted among its members men like Thomas Spence and Dr William Hodgson (The Female Citizen) who did advocate political rights and equality for women, the LCS appears to have been a male fraternity. The venues in which its divisions met – taverns and coffee houses – were predominantly male spaces, and reference to women in records of their proceedings are few.

In August 1793, the Society's General Committee approved a motion calling for the formation of a female Society of Patriots. By September, a government spy reported that there was a Society of Women meeting in Southwark. The LCS arranged to send two of its delegates to instruct them. But it does not appear that female patriots were ever admitted as members to the LCS itself. Women did turn out for major LCS demonstrations.

=== Noted members ===
The society had an early celebrity recruit, the ex-slave, free West-Indian black and abolitionist, Olaudah Equiano. In 1791–92, Equiano was touring the British Isles with his autobiography, The Interesting Narrative of the Life of Olaudah Equiano, or Gustavus Vassa the African. Drawing on abolitionist networks he brokered connections for the LCS, including what may have been the society's first contacts with the United Irishmen. In Belfast (where civic outrage had defeated plans to commission vessels for the Middle Passage) Equiano was hosted by the leading United Irishman, publisher of their Painite newspaper the Northern Star, Samuel Neilson.

Paine subscribed to the Society; as did the radical poet William Blake; Joseph Ritson the noted antiquarian and founder of modern vegetarianism; and Basil William Douglas, Lord Daer, who held concurrent membership of the Society for Constitutional Information and the Scottish Association of the Friends of the People.

=== London's sans-culottes ===
Despite such notables, the government were assured by their most trusted informer, "'Citizen' Groves", that the real body of the club was made of "the very lowest order of society". They took little persuading that within the LCS English Jacobins were leading on the equivalent to the sans-culottes of the revolutionary Paris sections. Some of the working class membership did take the republican doctrines of Paine to their extreme, posing the claims of an absolute political democracy against those of monarchy and aristocracy.

Of these radical democrats, the most renowned was Thomas Spence. Originally from Newcastle, where he had protested the enclosure of commons, Spence re-issued as The Real Rights of Man a penny pamphlet he had produced in 1775, Property in Land Every One's Right. His vision was of a society based on common ownership of land administered democratically, by men and women alike, at the parish level. In 1797, in response to Thomas Paine's Agrarian Justice, he wrote The Rights of Infants which, in the course of vindicating the right of children to freedom from want and abuse, proposed an unconditional and universal basic income.

== Political equality not social "levelling" ==
From the outset, the LCS contended with the charge that a "full and equal representation of the people" in Parliament represented a "levelling" of all distinctions of rank and property. This was delivered, and (with considerable Church and aristocratic patronage) circulated widely, in a short three-penny pamphlet Village Politics: Addressed to All the Mechanics, Journeymen, and Day Labourers in Great Britain (1793). Written by Hannah More as "Burke for Beginners", it is an imagined conversation in which a mason learns from a blacksmith that to declare for "Liberty and Equality" is to associate with "levellers" and "republicans", rogues who hide from him the simple truth that if everyone is digging potatoes on their half acre no one would be available to mend his broken spade.

Against this onslaught, the LCS produced "An Explicit Declaration of the Principles and View of the L.C.S". But for having to address the "frantic" notions of "alarmists", it claimed that those who would "restore the House of Commons to a state of independence" would never even conceive "so wild and detestable a sentiment" as "the equalisation of property".

We know and are sensible that the Wages of every man are his Right; that Difference of Strength, of Talents, and of Industry, do and ought to afford proportional Distinction of Property, which, when acquired and confirmed by the Laws, is sacred and inviolable.

The LCS did not pronounce on social questions, confident that key to addressing inequities lay in reform of the constitution. It was sufficient to observe that it was from the "partial, unequal, and therefore inadequate Representation, together with the corrupt method in which Representatives are elected," that "oppressive Taxes, unjust Laws, restrictions of Liberty, and wasting of the Public Money, have ensued."

There were members, however, who appeared to revel in the scorn of ruling opinion. To Edmund Burke, James Parkinson, physician (Parkinson's disease) and pamphleteer, wrote "An Address from the Swinish Multitude" and allowed that "REPUBLICAN, DEMOCRAT and LEVELLER" were "all distinctions" with which he had "for some time been favoured".

== The Conventions and Pitt's "Reign of Terror" ==
=== The first Edinburgh Convention ===
At the end of November 1792 the LCS published an Address of the London Corresponding Society to the other Societies of Great Britain, united for obtaining a Reform in Parliament expressing confidence in the prospects for obtaining a reformed, democratic franchise through "moral force". A national convention was called for Edinburgh in December.

The LCS delegates' host in the Scottish capital, and perhaps the most radical delegate present, Thomas Muir of the Society of the Friends of the People, himself said nothing that was not strictly constitutional. An address which he presented from the United Irishmen (largely drawn up by William Drennan) was made acceptable to the Convention only by redacting any suggestion of "Treason or Misprison of Treason against the Union [of Scotland] with England". Beginning with the title "Convention", and including an oath to "live free or die", the "imitation of French forms" did cause the authorities some alarm. Minor prosecutions were instituted.

=== The Edinburgh treason trials ===
By the time LCS delegates attended their second reform convention in Edinburgh in October 1793, the political climate had changed dramatically. From 1 February 1793 the Crown was at war with the new French Republic. Any association with Paris or defence of its policies, foreign or domestic, was now regarded as treasonable. In May 1793 the House of Commons refused by 282 votes to 41 even to consider petitions asking for reform.

At a time when reformers were beginning to mobilise a broad swath of opinion in Britain in favour of a reformed Parliament and a strictly constitutional monarchy, they were being forced, by their early embrace of the French revolution, to defend policies in France they did not advocate at home: the execution of the king and of regime opponents, the confiscation of the property of the Church and nobility. Following the institution of the Reign of Terror, the French Republic paid no heed to the entreaties in Paris of Thomas Muir or, from his place in the French National Convention, of Thomas Paine.

After Muir returned to Scotland, he was charged with treason. Although the prosecutorial evidence amounted to little more than a presentation of his political views, in August 1793 a jury of landlords upheld the charge. Muir was sentenced to 14 years transportation. Convicted of sedition, the same fate befell the secretary of a second Edinburgh convention in October, 1793, William Skirving, and the two LCS delegates.

Joseph Gerrald and LCS chairman Maurice Margarot had been elected as delegates to the convention by the LCS's first open-air meeting, attended by some 4,000 persons in a field off the Hackney Road. Gerrald had published earlier in the year A Convention the Only Means of Saving Us from Ruin. With ancient precedents sought in the Anglo-Saxon mycelgemot (popular assemblies) and wittengamot (delegated representatives), the pamphlet's laid out a three-stage sequence, from local gatherings to regional delegations to national convention. There was the scarcely disguised suggestion that such a convention would have a representative legitimacy greater than the corrupted, unreformed Parliament.

As the son of a wine importer, Margarot (who alone survived to return to England in 1810) had continental connections, including residence in Paris during the first year of the revolution. These allowed the authorities to draw upon him the suspicion of being a French spy.

=== The London treason trials ===
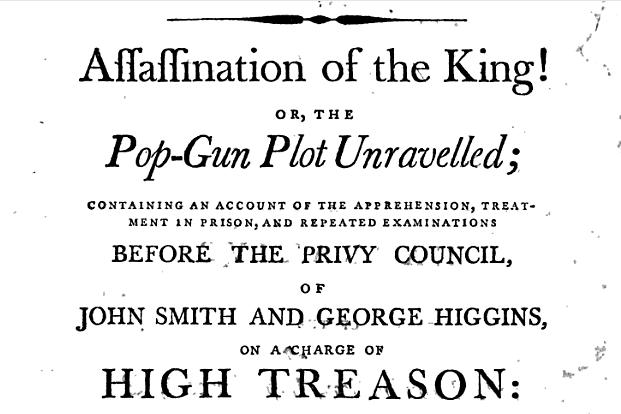
Frontispiece for John Smith's 1795 account of testimony before the Privy Council on the "Pop-Gun" Plot

The weight of repression substantially reduced popular societies in the provinces. In London, Hardy and Margarot's successor as chairman, John Baxter, undaunted, had drawn up addresses to "the friends of peace and parliamentary reform" and to "His Majesty" calling for an end to the war against France. Prime Minister, William Pitt, responded by having the papers of the London societies seized and examined by a secret committee of the House of Commons.

In May 1794, hard on the committee's "Report on Radical and Reform Societies", charges of treason were laid against thirty leading radicals including Hardy, Thomas Spence, the dramatist Thomas Holcroft, the poet, public lecturer and journalist John Thelwall, and sometime parliamentary candidate John Horne Tooke. Their trials in November misfired. The juries in London were not as ready as those in Edinburgh to accept the mere expression of political opinion as evidence of plots against King and Parliament. When the evidence running to four printed volumes failed to impress in the case of Hardy, the courts were unable to take seriously the charges against his associates: Horne Tooke jeered at the Attorney-General and clowned in the dock, and the Lord Chief Justice slept through the prosecution's summary against Thelwall.

The process did deliver Hardy a blow: during his trial his wife was attacked in their home by a loyalist "Church and King mob" and subsequently died in childbirth. On his release, Hardy did not return to his position in the Society.

Beginning in the course of these trials further LCS arrests were made. Paul Thomas LeMaitre (an 18-year old a gold watch case maker), George Higgins (a chemist), John Smith (a bookseller, who with Higgins and James Parkinson had already been called before the Privy Council), and Dr. Robert Thomas Crossfield (whom witnesses testified to hearing singing a song damning King) were indicted as accomplices in the so-called "Popgun Plot", an alleged conspiracy to assassinate George III by means of a poison dart fired from an airgun. In May 1796, their cases similarly collapsed.

The reformers were not allowed to celebrate their victory. John Smith provocatively renamed his shop The Pop Gun, and sold a pamphlet that explained that the government required three instruments: 1) soldiers ("by profession slaughterers"), 2) clergymen (who "hallow with the sanction of Divinity state robbery"), and 3) lawyers (who "thrive on misery" and are the "tyrants of property"). In December 1796, he was given two years hard labour on bread and water for seditious libel.

In advance of the treason trials, habeas Corpus had been suspended and six members of the Society detained, including Thomas Spence. Invoking the presence of "a traitorous and detestable conspiracy ... formed for subverting the existing laws and constitution, and for introducing the system of anarchy and confusion which has so fatally prevailed in France", in May 1794 Parliament had allowed the Privy Council to direct detentions "any law or statute to the contrary notwithstanding"

== Radicalisation and dissolution ==
=== The final rally ===
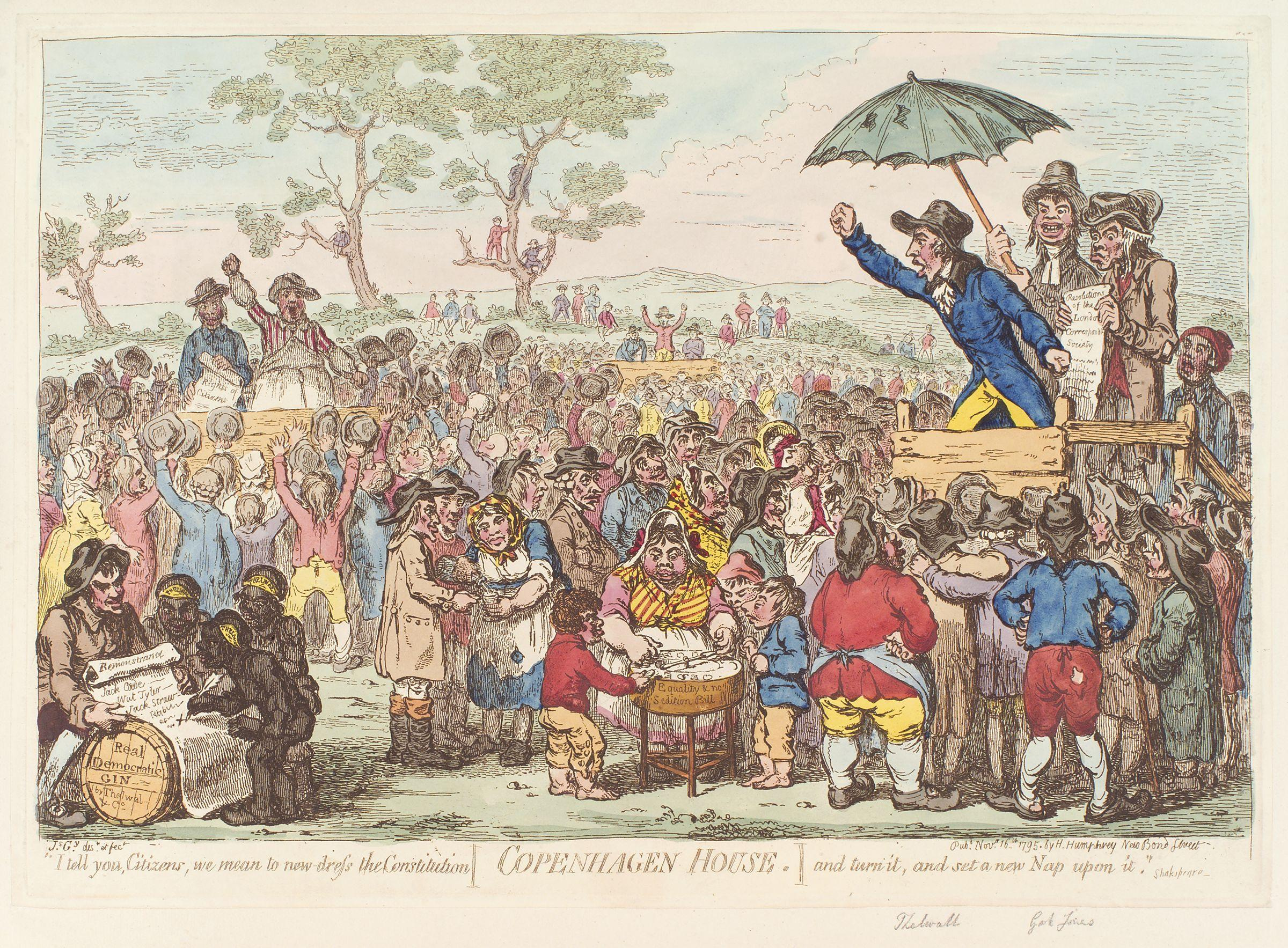
LCS speakers address the crowds at Copenhagen Fields, 1795. John Gale Jones on hustings to the left.

In the summer of 1795, weariness with the war combined with failed harvests to trigger renewed protest—including an attack on the Prime Minister's residence in Downing Street. The Society was growing again: from 17 divisions in March to 79 in October. General Meetings were attended by tens of thousands.

The LCS called a "monster meeting" for 26 October 1795 at Copenhagen Fields, Islington. Veteran reformers Joseph Priestley, John Thelwall and Charles James Fox, joined Hardy's successor as LCS secretary John Ashley (another shoemaker); chairman John Binns (a plumber's labourer), John Gale Jones (surgeon), and William Duane (Irish-American editor of The Telegraph) in addressing crowds estimated at upwards of 200,000.

For the Society, Binns and Ashley declared that should the British nation, in the face of "the continuation of the present detestable War, the horrors of an approaching Famine, and above all, the increased Corruption, and Inquisitorial measures, demand strong and decisive measures", the London Corresponding Society would be "the powerful organ" ushering in "joyful tidings of peace ... universal suffrage and annual parliaments". Three days later, George III, in procession to the state Opening of Parliament, had the windows of his carriage smashed by crowd shouting "No King, No Pitt, No war".

=== The "Gagging Acts" ===
Seizing upon this incident, and in response to their earlier humiliation in the courts, the government introduced the so-called "Gagging Acts" of 1795. The Seditious Meetings Act 1795 and the Treason Act 1795 made writing and speaking as much treason as overt acts, and made inciting hatred of the government a "high misdemeanour". They also required licences for public meetings, lectures and reading rooms. These restrictions, with the encouragement given to magistrates to use public order powers to close taverns and bookshops regarded as centres of radical activity, wound down the Society's extensive publishing programme—some eighty separate pamphlets and broadsides and two periodicals —and, in general, "hamstrung" its propaganda activity.

The rally in LCS membership and activity in the summer of 1795 was brief. The problem was not alone Pitt's "reign of terror".

=== The fall of Paine ===
As an immediate leader of popular opinion there had been no rival to Paine. But following the purge and mass execution of the Girondins in June 1793, in France Paine found himself a prisoner of the revolution he had defended. In prison, and prior to an obscure American exile, he had produced his second great work, published in 1796 and 1797. The Age of Reason submitted the Christian bible and churches to the same type of deconstructive logical analysis that The Rights of Man had applied to the monarchy and aristocracy. The social historian G. D. H. Cole noted that only "the broadest-minded Unitarian could tolerate it, and the dissenters [the Non-Conformists] who till then had been consistent if timid recruits to the reform movement, were henceforth as horrified as the bishops themselves".

Already in 1795 disgruntled Methodists had withdrawn from the LCS to form the Friends of Religious and Civil Liberty. Prominent among them was Richard Lee, a bookseller reputedly expelled from the LCS for refusing to stock Paine's newest work and yet subsequently prosecuted for publishing the regicidal handbill King Killing, and Edward Iliff's A summary of the duties of citizenship, written expressly for the members of the London Corresponding Society.

=== United Britons ===
The government's closure of peaceful avenues for reform agitation, and the prospect of French assistance, encouraged a radical rump to consider the threat implicit in the Copenhagen Fields address: to achieve universal male suffrage and annual parliaments by physical force. In this, they were supported by the United Irishmen. The LCS's Moral and Political Magazine applauded the democratic spirit of the "floating republics" created by the Spithead and Nore mutinies in April and May 1797. But, while the government was quick to see the hand of the LCS and of the United Irishmen, whose members were present and whose literature circulated among the sailors, no evidence emerged of the mutineers being directed by societies' agents. A revolutionary conspiracy takes clearer shape with the arrival in London of the Irish priest James Coigly.

In Manchester, Coigly and a cotton spinner from Belfast, James Dixon, had helped convert the town's Corresponding Society into the republican, United Englishmen. Bound by a test that promised to "Remove the diadem and take off the crown ... [and to] exalt him that is low and abuse him that is high", the United men went on to organise in Stockport, Bolton, Warrington and Birmingham. Like the United Scotsmen, in their constitutions the new societies were "direct copies of the United Irishmen".

Presenting himself as an emissary of the United Irish executive in Dublin, Coigly met with leading members of the LCS, among them the Irishmen Edward Despard, the brothers Benjamin and John Binns, William Henry Hamilton, and Alexander Galloway who had succeeded as the Society's chairman when, in protest against the violent turn in rhetoric, Francis Place resigned. Meetings were held at Furnival's Inn, Holborn, at which United delegates from London (where several divisions of United Englishmen appear to have formed), Scotland and the regions were reported to have committed themselves "to overthrow the present Government, and to join the French as soon as they made a landing in England" (in December 1796 only weather had prevented a major French landing in Ireland).

In March 1798 Coigly was arrested in a party with O'Connor, Benjamin Binns, and John Allen at Margate just as they were to embark for France. Found on his person was an address (composed by Dr. Crossfield) to the French Directory from the "United Britons". While its suggestion of a mass movement primed for insurrection had been scarcely credible, it was sufficient proof of the intent to invite and encourage a French invasion. Coigly was hanged in June.

=== Turn against United conspiracy, and final suppression ===
On 30 January 1798, the LCS had issued an Address to the United Irishmen, declaring that "If to Unite in the Cause of Reform upon the Broadest Basis be Treason .... We, with you, are Traitors". Yet the disillusionment with France was widespread and by the time of Coigly's arrest the majority view was that the entire business of coordinating with the Directory and the United Irish was a destructive diversion. The Central Committee of Delegates suspected that the government exaggerated the threat of a French invasion, but agreed that in the event members would join their local, government-approved, militias.

On 19 April 1798, just as this was being resolved in a pub in Drury Lane, the committee was raided by the police. Together with parallel raids on corresponding societies in Birmingham and Manchester, a total of 28 persons were arrested, among them Thomas Evans, Edward Despard, John Bone, Benjamin Binns, Paul LeMaitre, Richard Hodgson and Alexander Galloway. The next day, Pitt renewed the suspension of habeas corpus absolving the government of the need to present evidence of complicity in Coigly's mission. The prisoners were held without charge until hostilities with France were (temporarily) halted with the Treaty of Amiens in 1801.

According to Francis Place (who, for the good name of the LCS and the reform movement as a whole, had threatened to inform on United conspirators) this stroke extinguished the society. Members made no attempt to meet again, not even in any division and abandoned their delegates. A final act of Parliament, the Unlawful Societies Act 1799 (39 Geo. 3. c. 79), "for the more effectual suppression of societies established for seditious and treasonable Purposes; and for better preventing treasonable and seditious practices", referenced and banned the LCS by name, along with the United Englishmen, the United Scotsmen, the United Britons, and the United Irishmen.

Despard, who had protested a betrayal of the United Britons as "dishonourable", was executed for treasonable association with their remnants—the so-called Despard Plot—in 1803.

== Legacy ==
In The Making of the English Working Class (1963), in which he proposes to "rescue the poor stockinger, the Luddite cropper, the 'obsolete' hand-loom weaver, [and] the 'utopian' artisan ... from the enormous condescension of posterity", E. P. Thompson identified the London Corresponding Society as a key incident in the emergence of a "working-class consciousness" in England. It was a waypoint in the developing sense among English working people that they have "an identity of interests as between themselves, and as against other men whose interests are different from (and usually opposed to) theirs". At the same time, it is suggested that the LCS demonstrated, as Hardy had wished, that the working class was "capable of civility, rational thought, informed debate, and peaceable assembly".

These were achievements that prefigured and contributed to the popular agitation that secured passage of the 19th century Reform parliamentary bills. Francis Place survived to be active in the agitation for the first of these, the Reform Act 1832. In 1839, Place was invited by the London Working Men's Association to become one of the London delegates to the National Convention of what might be considered as the industrial working-class continuity of the Correspondence movement of the 1790s, the Chartists.

== Selected members ==
- John Baxter
- John Binns
- William Blake
- Edward Despard
- Basil William Douglas
- William Duane
- Olaudah Equiano
- Thomas Evans
- Joseph Gerrald
- William Hamilton
- Thomas Hardy
- William Hodgson
- John Gale Jones
- Maurice Margarot
- Thomas Paine
- James Parkinson
- Francis Place
- Joseph Ritson
- Thomas Spence
- John Thelwall
