= Surprize (1780 ship) =

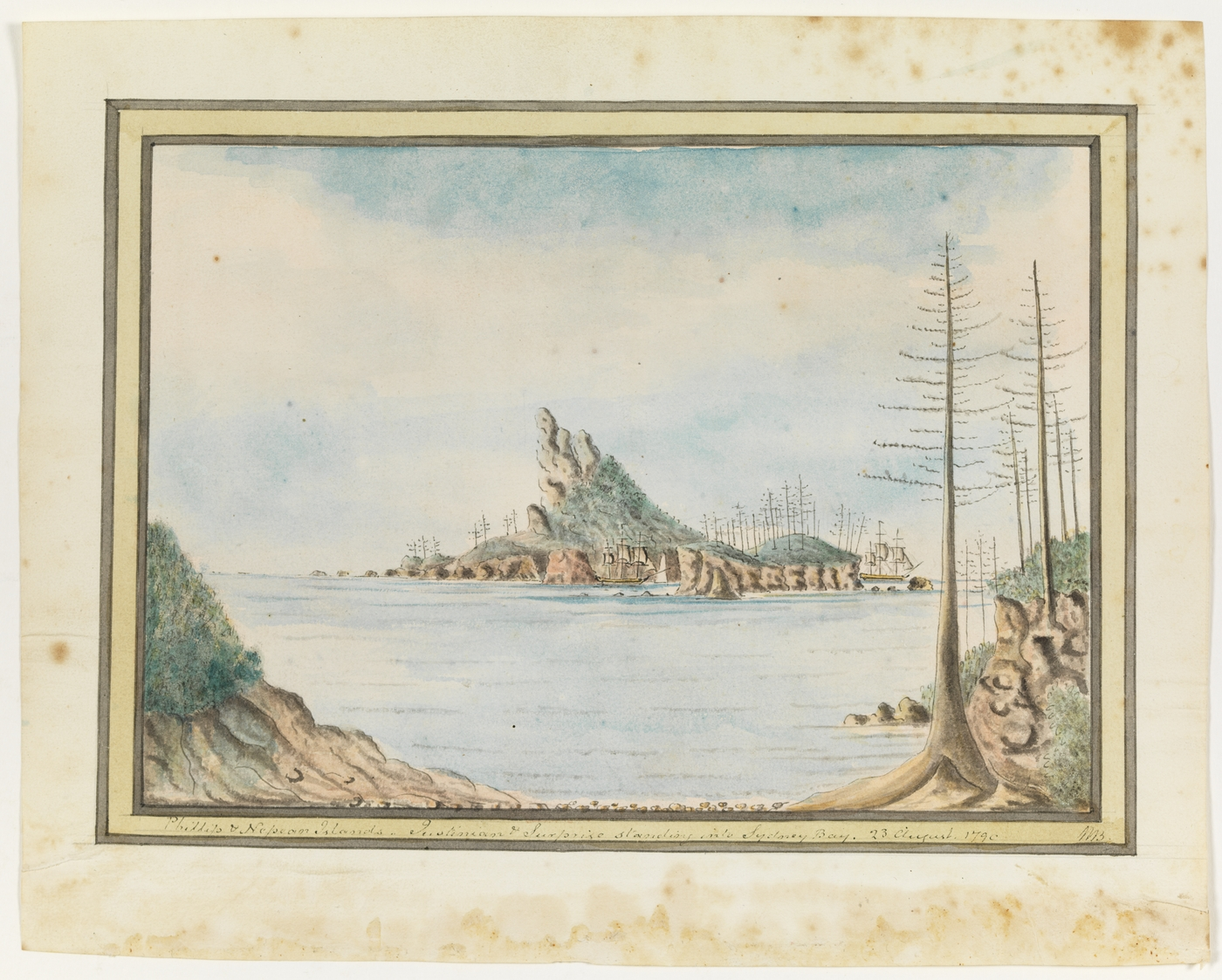
- Justinian and Surprize standing into Sydney Bay, Norfolk Island, 23 August 1790; William Bradley

History

Great Britain
- Name: Surprize
- Owner: Calvert & Co.
- Builder: Shoreham
- Launched: 1780
- Captured: 1799 in the Bay of Bengal

General characteristics
- Tons burthen: 394, or 402 (bm)
- Length: 107 ft 9 in (32.8 m) (overall); 85 ft 8 in (26.1 m) (keel)
- Beam: 29 ft 5 in (9.0 m)
- Depth of hold: 13 ft 3 in (4.0 m)
- Complement: 24
- Armament: 1794: 20 × 6 & 4-pounder + 6 × swivel guns; 1799: 20 × 6-pounder guns

Surprize was a three-deck merchant vessel launched in 1780 that made five voyages as a packet ship under charter to the British East India Company (EIC). She also participated in the notorious Second Fleet, transporting convicts to Port Jackson. A French frigate captured her in the Bay of Bengal in 1799.

== First EIC voyage (1783) ==
Under the command of Captain David Asquith, Surprize left Bengal on 22 April 1783 and reached the River Shannon on 11 September. She arrived at The Downs on 17 October.

== Second EIC voyage (1785) ==
Captain Asquith sailed for Bengal, leaving Britain on 23 January 1784. She may have left as late as 29 April. She arrived at Calcutta by 9 September, bringing with her "a variety of articles, as well useful as curious". Surprize arrived back in Britain on 16 May 1785.

== Third EIC voyage ==
Captain Asquith left the Downs on 10 July 1785. He was sailing to Madras and Bengal. Surprize was then to remain there.

== Second Fleet and fourth EIC voyage (1790–91) ==
It is not clear when Surprize returned to Britain. She was in Britain in 1789, being repaired by Calvert (her owner). At that time her measurements were taken. Her entry in Lloyd's Register for 1789 has an addendum showing that she would be sailing for Botany Bay. Camden, Calvert & King were contracted to transport, clothe and feed convicts for a flat fee of £17 7s. 6d per head, whether they landed alive or not.

In company with Neptune and Scarborough, she sailed from England with 254 male convicts on 19 January 1790. Her master was Nicholas Anstis, formerly chief mate on Lady Penrhyn in the First Fleet, and surgeon was William Waters.

At 394 tons (bm), Surprize was the smallest ship of the fleet, and was an unsuitable vessel for so long a voyage, proving to be a wet ship even in moderate weather. In rough seas and heavy gales the convicts "were considerably above their waists in water", according to the commander of the guards.

She arrived at the Cape of Good Hope on 13 April 1790, and spent sixteen days there, taking on provisions. She was parted from her consorts in heavy weather and came in sight of Port Jackson on 23 June. Contrary winds blew her out to sea again and she did not make port until 26 June 158 days after having left England. During the voyage 36 convicts died (14%), and 121 (48%) were sick when landed.

From Port Jackson Surprize first sailed to Norfolk Island, arriving there on 28 August in company with Justinian. Surprize then sailed to Canton, to load tea for the EIC for the return journey to Britain. On the way Anstis sighted, identified as an island, and named Montague Island (36°15′S 150°13′E) after George Montagu-Dunk, 2nd Earl of Halifax.

She left Whampoa on 4 February 1791 and reached Anger on 29 April. She did not reach St Helena until 8 July, but arrived at The Downs on 6 September.

Australian statesman William Wentworth was born onboard Surprize to convict mother Catherine Crowley and surgeon D'Arcy Wentworth just off Norfolk Island.

== Slaver (1791–93) ==
In 1791 and 1793, Surprize attempted two voyages as a slave ship. Her owners for both voyages owners were Anthony Calvert, Thomas King, and William Campbell, and her master was J. Martin, though "Cambell" succeeded him during the second.

On the first voyage she sailed 13 December 1791 but a nautical mishap caused her to end the voyage before she had embarked any slaves.

On Surprize's second voyage she left London on 2 July 1792, bound for the Gold Coast. She gathered her slaves at Cape Coast Castle, which she left on 1 April 1793. She transported the slaves to Kingston, Jamaica, where she arrived on 20 May with 518 slaves. She arrived back at London on 11 October.

Lloyd's Register for 1794 provides the following information:

Year	Master	Owner	Trade
1794	J. Martin; P. Campbell	Calvert & Co.	London–Africa; London–Botany Bay

Also, Lloyd's Register indicates that Surprize underwent a thorough repair for damages in 1792.

== Second convict transport and fifth EIC voyage (1794–96) ==
Captain Patrick Campbell received a letter of marque on 20 January 1794. Surprize left England on 2 May with 33 male and 58 female convicts. The guards consisted of an ensign, a sergeant, and 23 privates of the New South Wales Corps. Among the privates were six men who were deserters from other British regiments and who chose the Corps over remaining in gaol; one was a mutineer from Quebec. On the vessel were four Scottish Martyrs, the political prisoners Thomas Muir, Thomas Fyshe Palmer, William Skirving, and Maurice Margarot. The surgeon for the voyage was James Thompson.

Surprize sailed with a convoy of East Indiamen and under the escort of HMS Suffolk, Captain Peter Rainier. One of the Indiamen was the General Goddard, which would participate in a noteworthy capture of several Dutch East Indiamen in 1795 while on her return voyage to England. The convoy also included Ocean and Phoenix.

On 31 May a convict reported to Captain Campbell that the six deserters, all Irish, had been plotting in Gaelic to kill Campbell and take over the ship once it had separated from the convoy. Campbell put the men in chains, together with his first officer, Mr. Macpherson, whom Cambell suspected of knowing of the mutiny.

On 30 June Surprize parted from Suffolk and the East Indiamen.

Surprize arrived at Rio de Janeiro on 2 July, in company with HMS Swift. (Note: Swift would be lost with all hands while sailing from Macao to England, presumed foundered in the South China Sea in a typhoon after last being seen on 2 July 1797.) Due to problems obtaining fresh water, Surprize remained at Rio until 2 August.

Surprize arrived at Port Jackson on 25 October. Campbell then sailed for Bengal. Surprize left Calcutta on 16 November 1795. Surprize reached St Helena on 16 February 1796 and Kinsale on 21 April, before arriving at The Downs on 9 May.

== Later career and capture ==
Lloyd's Register for 1799 shows that she underwent a repair in 1796. Then in 1799 her master was S. Moore, her owner was Calvert & Co., and her trade was London - India.

Lloyd's Register for 1800 noted that Surprize had been captured. Lloyd's List further reported that the French frigate Forte had captured Surprize, Osterley, and a number of other East Indiamen in the Bay of Bengal.
