= Popgun Plot =

Alleged 1794 conspiracy

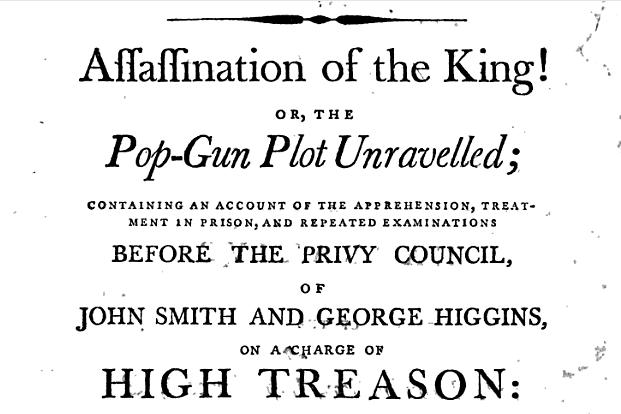
Frontispiece for LeMaitre's 1795 book

The Popgun Plot was an alleged 1794 conspiracy by three members of the London Corresponding Society to assassinate King George III by means of a poison dart fired from an airgun. Three members, Paul Thomas LeMaitre, John Smith, and George Higgins, were arrested in late 1794, and Robert Thomas Crossfield in December 1795. All four were acquitted of treason in May 1796, on the grounds that the chief witness against them was dead.
