= Political Martyrs' Monument =

Monument in Edinburgh, Scotland

Coordinates: 55.9534°N 3.1858°W

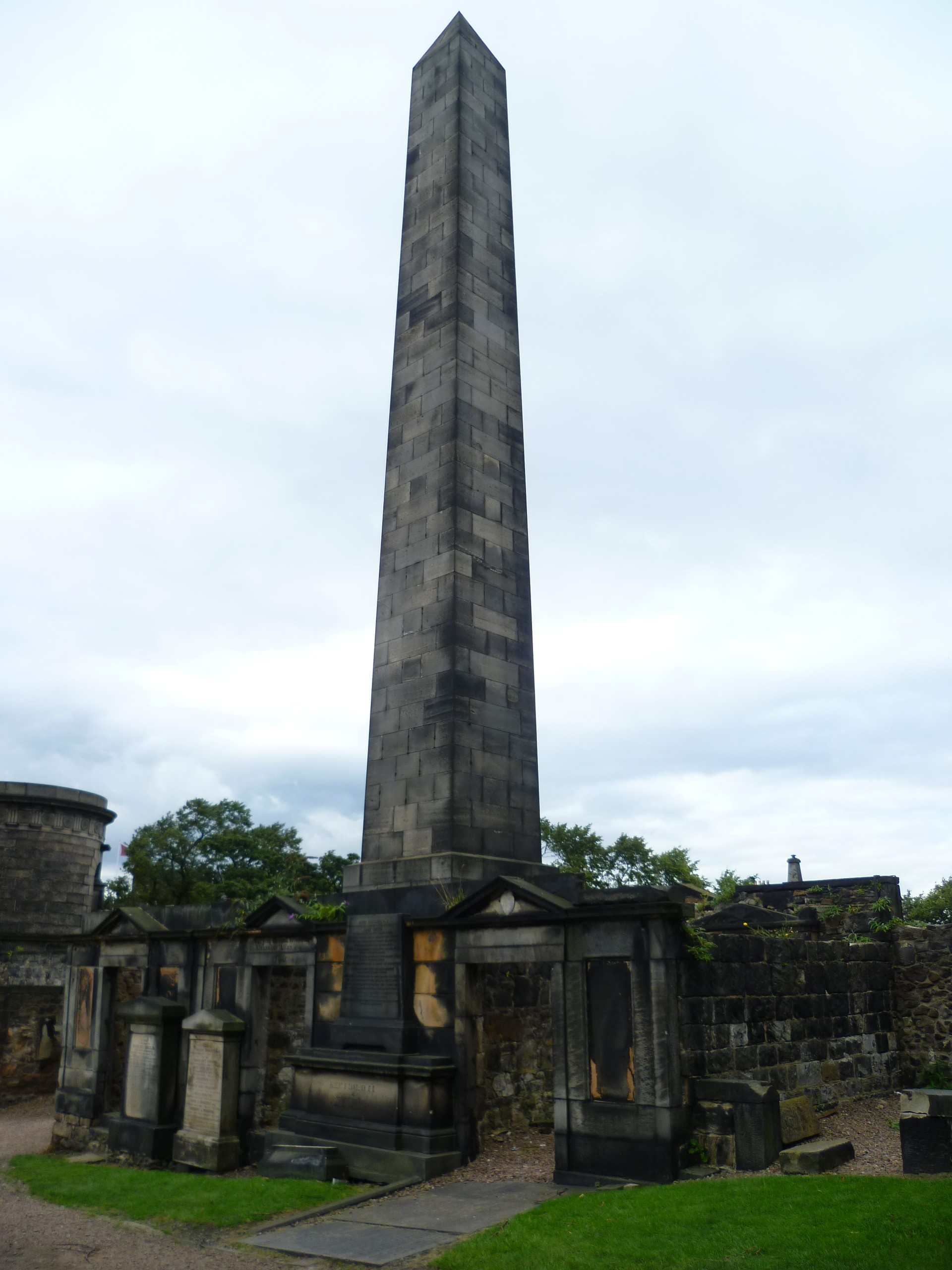
The Monument

The Political Martyrs Monument, located in the Old Calton Burial Ground on Calton Hill, Edinburgh, commemorates five political reformists from the late 18th and early 19th centuries. Designed by Thomas Hamilton and erected in 1844, it is a 90 ft (27 m) tall obelisk on a square-plan base plinth, all constructed in ashlar sandstone blocks. As part of the Burial Ground it is Category A listed.

== Inscriptions ==
The monument is inscribed on one side:

To
the memory of
Thomas Muir
Thomas Fyshe Palmer
William Skirving
Maurice Margarot
and
Joseph Gerrald

Erected by the Friends of Parliamentary Reform
In England and Scotland.
1844

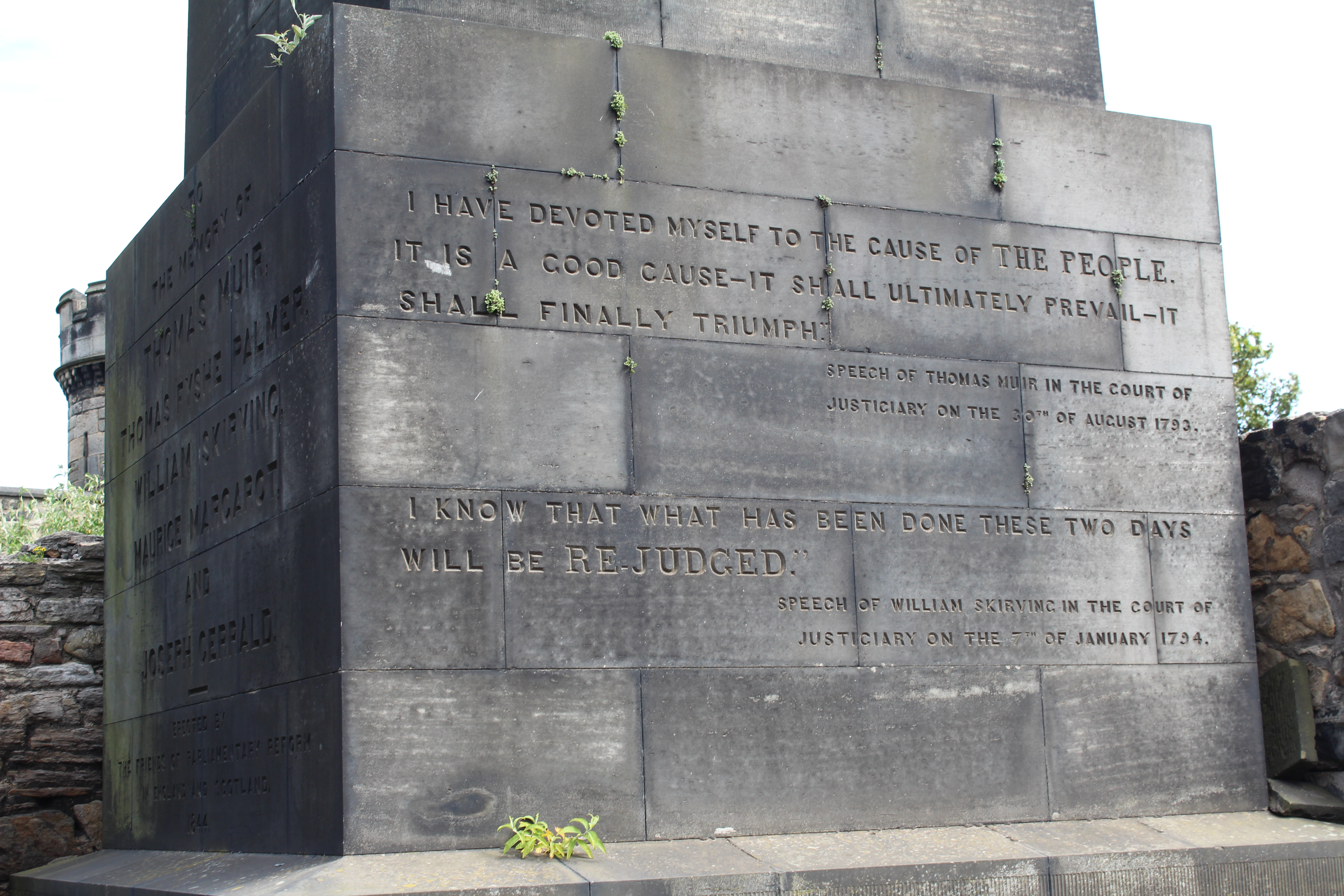
Inscriptions at the base of the monument

On another face are quotations from two of the men commemorated on the monument:

I have devoted myself to the cause of The People. It is a good cause—it shall ultimately prevail—it shall finally triumph.

— Speech of Thomas Muir in the Court of Justiciary on the 30th of August 1793.

I know that what has been done these two days will be Re-Judged.

— Speech of William Skirving in the Court of Justiciary on the 7th of January 1794.

== History ==
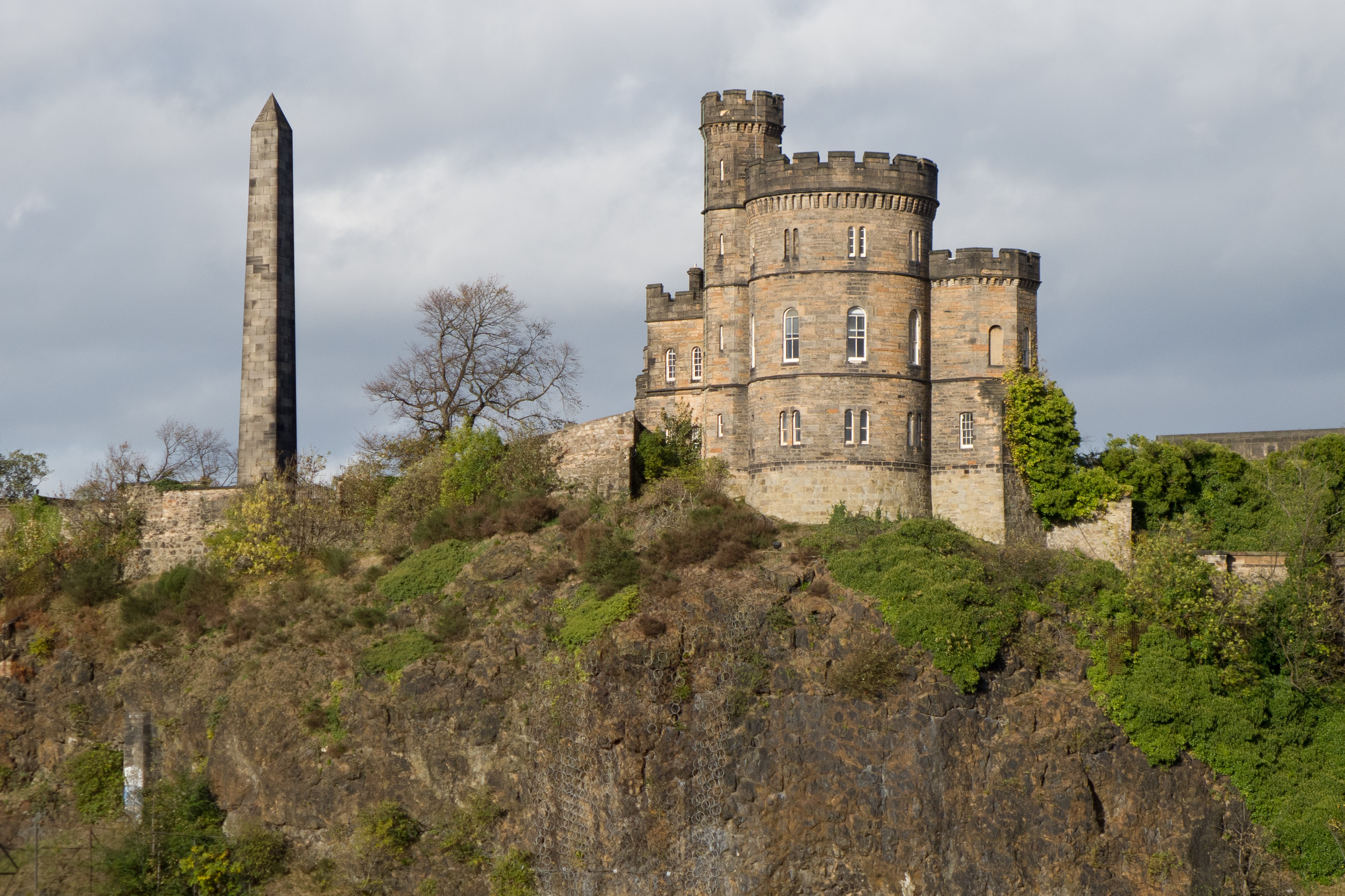
The Monument on Calton Hill, next to the Governor's House

In 1837 the Radical politician Joseph Hume MP initiated a plan to erect a monument to the five men. Hume chaired a London-based committee to raise public subscriptions in support of the monument and settled on its location being in Edinburgh. In that year the publisher William Tait of Edinburgh wrote on their behalf to the Lord Provost of Edinburgh requesting that land be made available on Calton Hill for this end.

The foundation stone was laid by Hume on 21 August 1844, with 3,000 people gathered for the occasion. The Old Calton Burial Ground, and other parts of Calton Hill, are home to a number of other monuments and memorials. The monument was designed by Thomas Hamilton, who is also responsible for a number of other structures on Calton Hill, including the former Royal High School building and the memorial to Robert Burns.

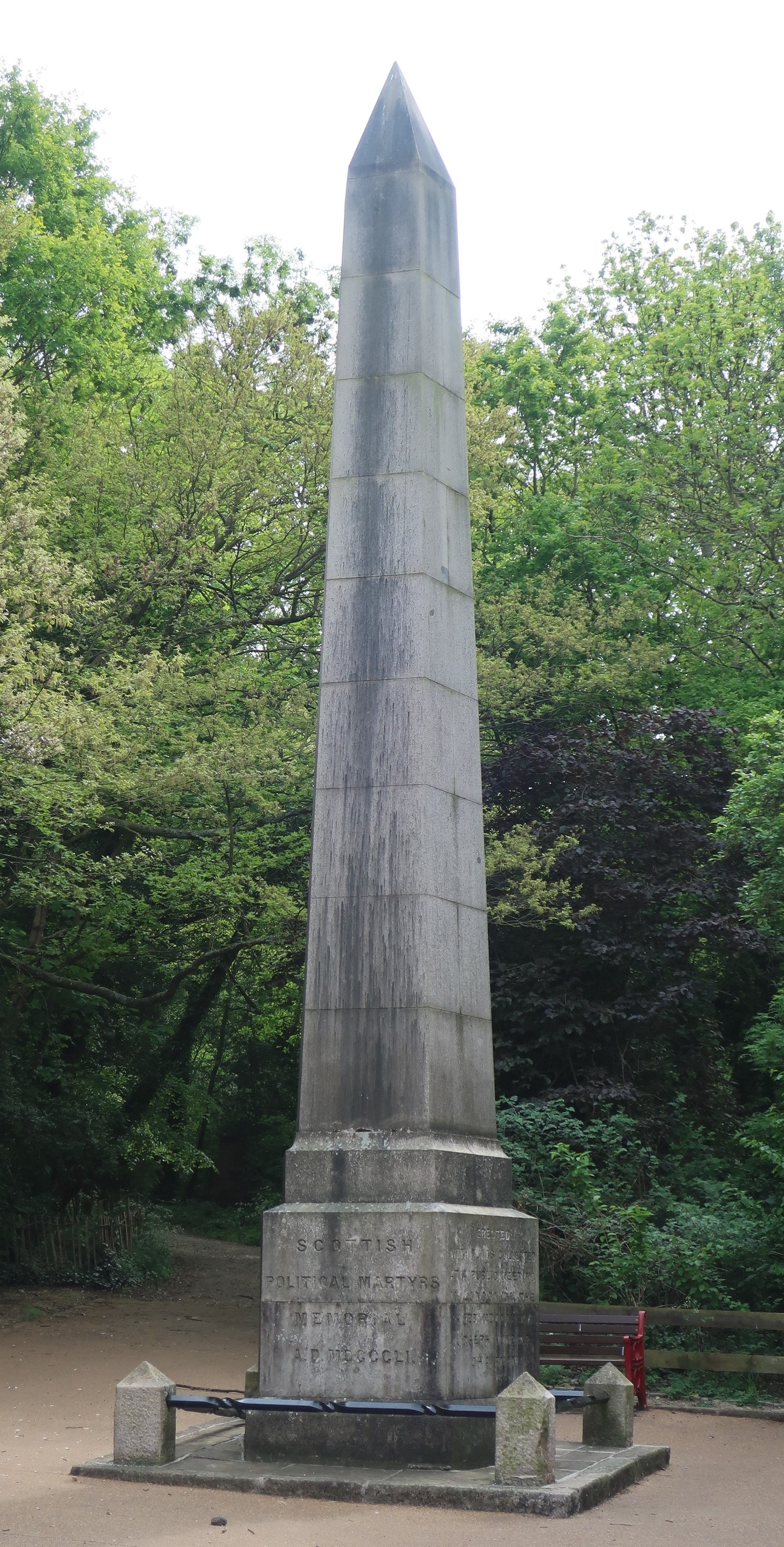
The monument in Nunhead Cemetery, London

In February 1852 Hume initiated the erection of a second monument at Nunhead Cemetery in London. This monument is an obelisk of similar design to its Edinburgh counterpart, but considerably smaller, standing at 33 ft (10 m) high.

== The Martyrs ==
The five men commemorated—two from Scotland and three from England—were imprisoned for campaigning for parliamentary reform under the influence of the ideals of the French Revolution. Specifically, their support of Palmer's 1793 address that advocated for universal suffrage and annual parliaments was considered incendiary. The five were accused of sedition in a series of trials in 1793 and 1794, and sentenced to terms of penal transportation in the British colony of New South Wales. All but Gerrald travelled together on the convict transport Surprize; Gerrald left later on the transport Sovereign.

Only Palmer and Margarot served their full 14-year sentences and were released. Palmer remained in New South Wales and established a thriving beer-brewing operation near Sydney Cove; he died of a fever on a trading voyage back to England. Margarot departed the colony when his sentence expired, and was the only one of the five to return to the British Isles.

Muir escaped in early 1796, stowing away aboard an American ship and ultimately making his way to revolutionary France where he died on 26 January 1799. On 16 March 1796 Gerrald died in Port Jackson, from tuberculosis exacerbated by a weakness brought on by excessive drinking. Skirving died three days later from either dysentery or an overdose of laudanum.

== Bibliography ==
- Knight, R. J. B.; Frost, Alan, eds. (1983). Journal of Daniel Paine, 1794–1797, together with documents illustrating the beginning of government boat-building and timber-gathering in New South Wales, 1795–1805. Sydney: Library of Australian History. ISBN 0908120494.
- Bewley, Christina (1981). Muir of Huntershill. Oxford: Oxford University Press. ISBN 0192117688.
