= Thomas Fyshe Palmer =

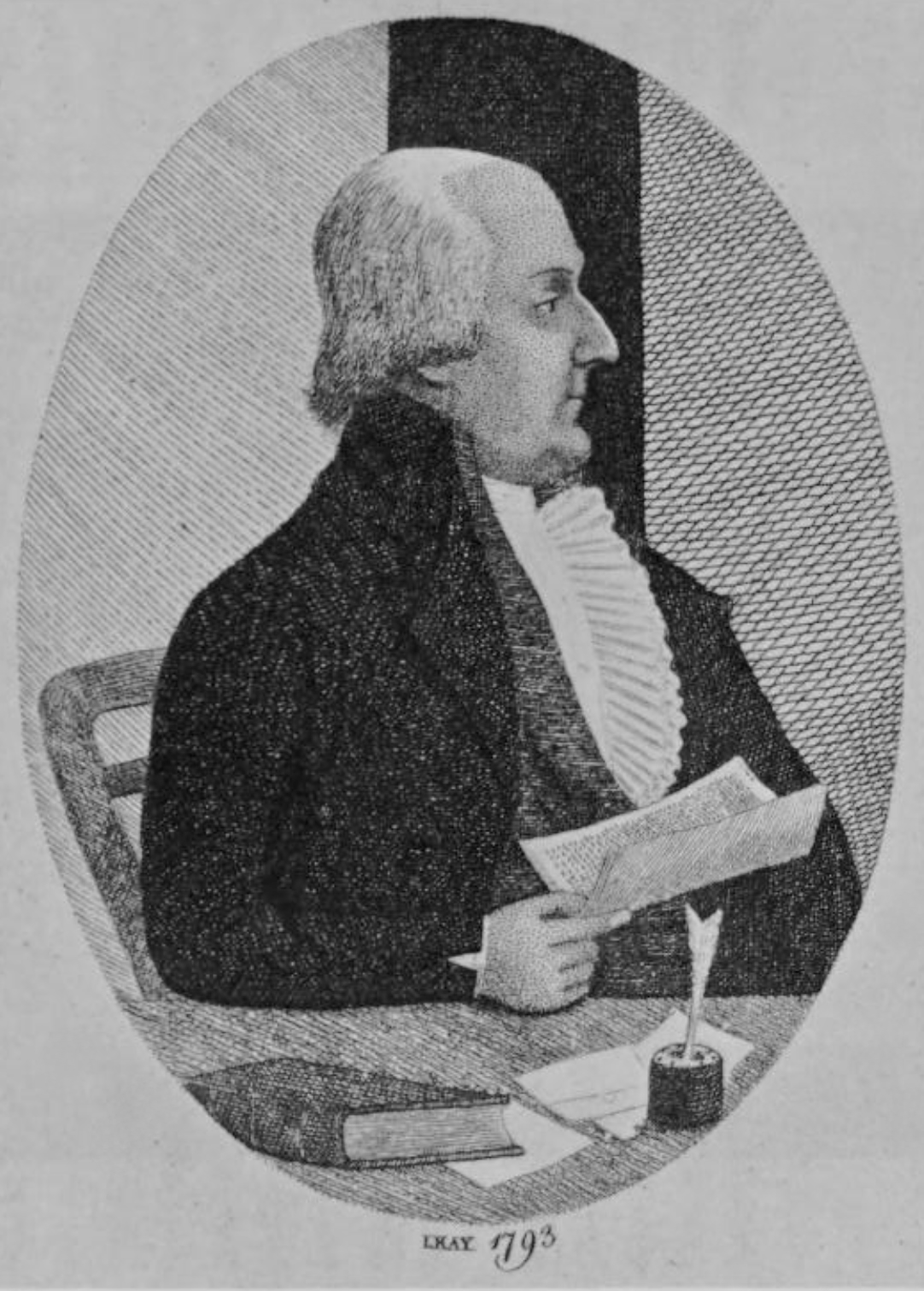
- Born: July 1747; Ickwell, Bedfordshire, England
- Died: 2 June 1802 (aged 54); Guam
- Occupation: Unitarian minister

Thomas Fyshe Palmer (1747–1802) was an English Unitarian minister, political reformer and convict.

== Early life and education ==
Thomas Fyshe Palmer was born in 1747 in Ickwell, Bedfordshire, England, the son of Henry Fyshe, who assumed the added name of Palmer because of an inheritance, and Elizabeth, the daughter of James Ingram of Barnet.

Palmer was educated at Eton College and Queens' College, Cambridge from 1765 with the purpose of taking holy orders in the Church of England. He graduated B.A. in 1769, M.A. in 1772, and BD in 1781. He obtained a fellowship of Queens' in 1781 and officiated for a year as curate at Leatherhead, Surrey. While at Leatherhead, he was introduced to Samuel Johnson and dined with him in London; but he had become disillusioned with some aspects of the Church of England.

== Unitarian ==
Palmer then read in Joseph Priestley's works and became a Unitarian. For the next ten years, Palmer preached Unitarianism to congregations in Dundee and other Scottish towns. A Unitarian society had been founded by William Christie, a merchant, at Montrose, and Palmer offered his services as a preacher (14 July 1783). In November 1783, Palmer reached Montrose and remained as Christie's colleague till May 1785. He then moved to Dundee to become pastor of a new Unitarian society there, and he founded a Unitarian church. He preached also in Edinburgh, Glasgow, Arbroath and Forfar and formed further Unitarian societies. In 1789, he took temporary charge of the society at Newcastle. In 1792, his sermons in Edinburgh attracted attention, and pamphlets were published in refutation of his doctrines.

== Activism and trial ==
When agitation for political reform began in 1792, Dundee became one of its centres in Scotland. A society called the 'Friends of Liberty' was formed in 1793 and met in the Berean meeting-house in the Methodist Close, beside the house where Palmer lived in the Overgait. The society was composed mainly of working men. One evening in June 1793, Palmer was attended a meeting, when George Mealmaker, weaver in Dundee, brought a draft of an address to the public, which he purposed circulating as a handbill. Palmer revised it by modifying it to a complaint against the government for war taxation and a claim for universal suffrage and short parliaments. The address was sent to be printed in Edinburgh in July 1793. The authorities were alarmed and decided to meet an anticipated revolution in time, and in the belief that they were attacking a revolutionary leader, Palmer was arrested in Edinburgh on 2 August on a charge of sedition as the author of the document.

At the preliminary legal inquiry, he refused to answer the questions put to him by pleading his ignorance of Scots law. He was confined in Edinburgh gaol but afterwards freed on bail. An indictment was served on him directing him to appear at the circuit court, Perth on 12 September to answer to the charge. The presiding judges were David Rae, Lord Eskgrove and Alexander Abercromby, Lord Abercromby; the prosecutor was John Burnett, advocate-depute, assisted by Allan Maconochie; and Palmer was defended by John Clerk, and Mr. Haggart. One of the first witnesses was Mealmaker, who admitted that he was the author of the address, and stated that Palmer was opposed to its publication. Other officials of the 'Friends of Liberty' corroborated, and the evidence proved nothing relevant to the charge beyond the fact that Palmer had ordered one thousand copies to be printed, but had given no instructions as to distribution.

Both the judges summed up adversely, and when the jury found the accused guilty, he was sentenced to seven years' transportation. The conviction of Palmer, following soon that of Thomas Muir, raised indignation among the Whig Party throughout the kingdom, and during February and March 1794, attempts were made by the Earl of Lauderdale and Earl Stanhope in the House of Lords and by Charles James Fox and Richard Brinsley Sheridan in the House of Commons to obtain the reversal of the sentence. However, the government, under William Pitt, was too strong.

== Transportation ==
Palmer was detained in Perth Tolbooth for three months, then taken to London and placed on the hulk Stanislaus at Woolwich, where he was put in irons for forced labour for three months. Palmer left in the Surprize, along with the so-called Scottish Martyrs, Thomas Muir, William Skirving and Maurice Margarot, embarking in February but sailing in April 1794, with a gang of convicts for Botany Bay. The vessel arrived at Port Jackson, New South Wales, on 25 October, and as Palmer and his companions had letters of introduction to the governor, they were well treated and had houses assigned to them.

Whilst serving his seven-year sentence in Sydney, Palmer did not suffer the usual convict restraint, and he engaged in business enterprises. Besides cultivating the land, the exiled reformers constructed a small vessel and traded to Norfolk Island. At the end of 1799 Palmer and his friend James Ellis, who had followed him from Dundee as a colonist, combined with others to purchase a vessel in which they might return home when Palmer's sentence expired in September 1800.

== Journey and death ==
Palmer and Ellis intended to trade on the homeward way and provisioned their vessel for six months, but their hopes of securing cargo in New Zealand were disappointed, and they were held up for half a year. They sailed to Tongatabu, where a war prevented them from landing. They steered for the Fiji Islands, where they were well received, but while making for Goraa, one of the group, their vessel struck a reef. Having refitted, they started for Macao.

Political Martyrs' Monument, Edinburgh

Adverse storms drove them about the Pacific until their provisions were exhausted, and they were compelled to put in at Guam, one of the Marianas Islands, then under Spanish rule. Spain and Britain were then at war, and the Spanish governor treated them as prisoners of war. Palmer contracted dysentery and died on 2 June 1802. He was buried by the seashore. Two years later, an American captain, Samuel W. Balch, arrived in Guam, found out where Palmer had been buried and had the remains exhumed and taken on board his vessel with the governor's permission. (Note: The Dictionary of National Biography states that Palmer died at Guguan, another of the Mariana Islands, but that appears to be a confusion with Guam, which was also known as Guajan or Guahan in the 19th century.) The remains were taken to Boston, Massachusetts, and reinterred on 2 February 1810 in the Trinity Church cemetery and reinterred again in the Mount Auburn Cemetery after the Great Boston Fire of 1872.

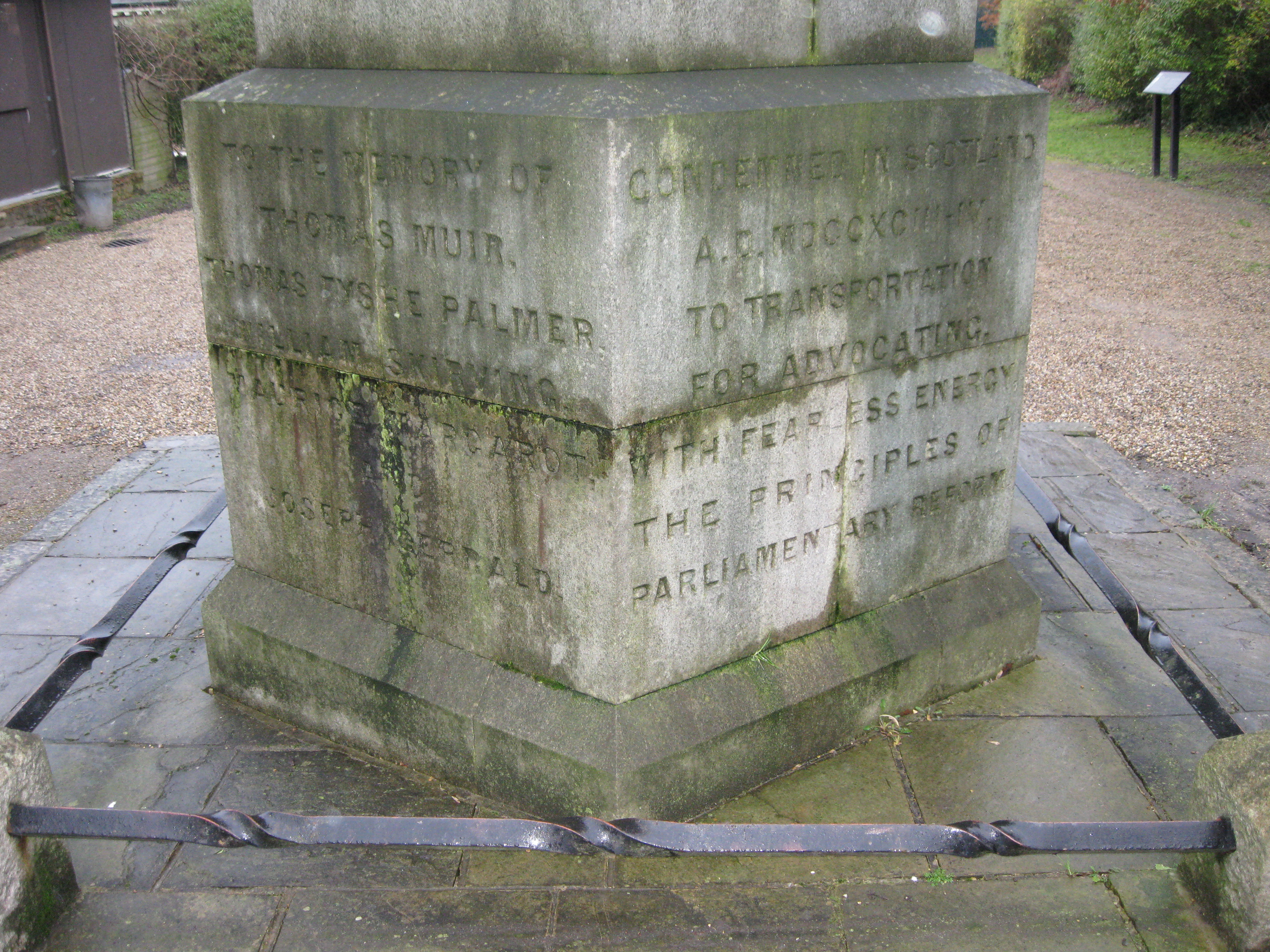
Nunhead Cemetery Monument inscription

A monument was erected in the Old Calton Cemetery, Edinburgh, in 1844 to commemorate Palmer, Muir and the other Scottish Martyrs. In 1852 a second, smaller monument was erected at Nunhead Cemetery, London.

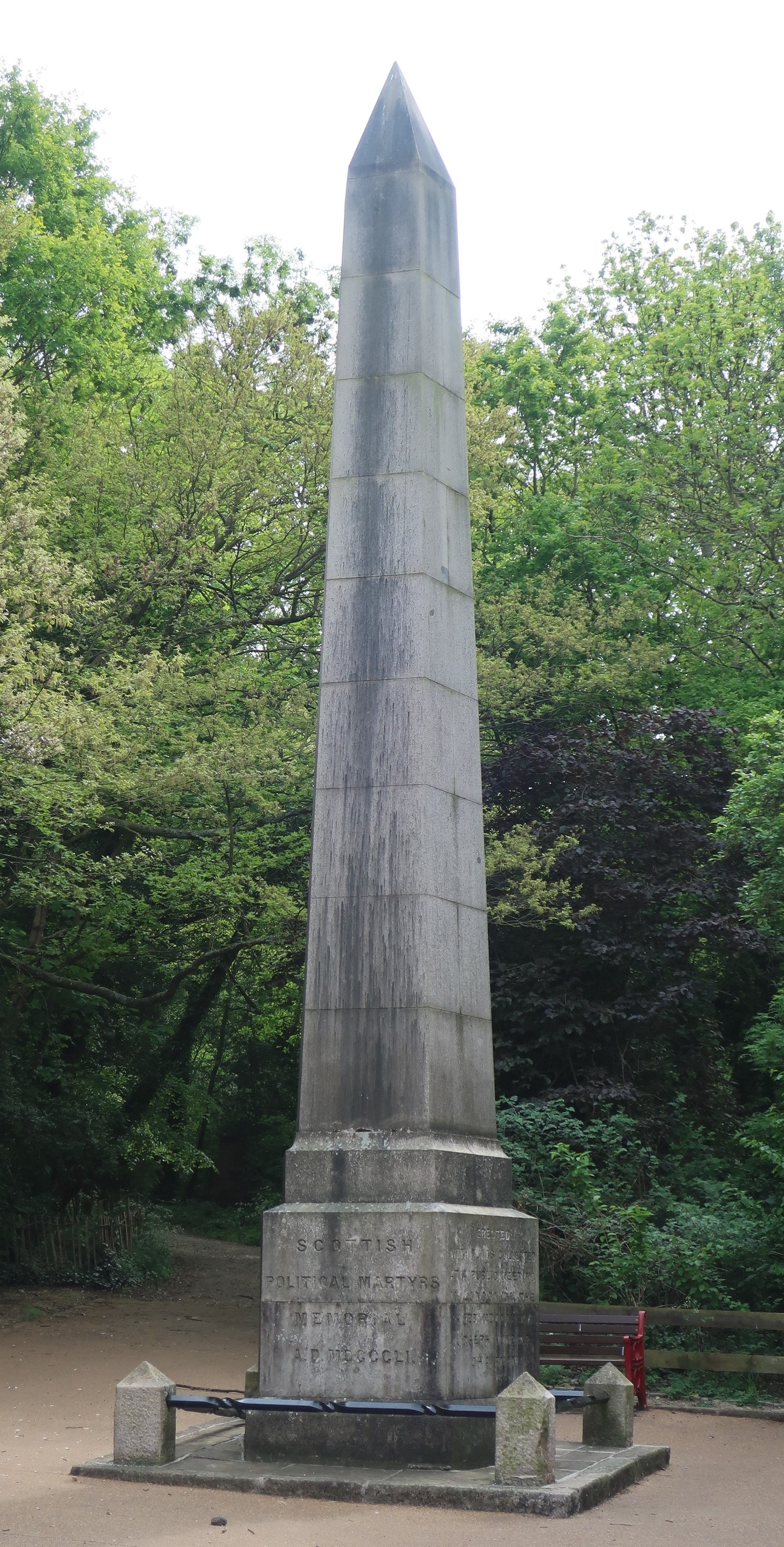
The monument in Nunhead Cemetery, London

== Works ==
Palmer's publications were mostly magazine articles and pamphlets. To the Theological Repository, he contributed regularly in 1789–90, as Anglo-Scotus. In 1792 he published a controversial pamphlet, An Attempt to refute a Sermon by H. D. Inglis on the Godhead of Jesus Christ, and to restore the long-lost Truth of the First Commandment, against Henry David Inglis (1757–1806). His Narrative of the Sufferings of T. F. Palmer and W. Skirving was published in 1797. Several of his letters were published in the biographies of contemporary Unitarians.

== Family ==
His nephew, Charles Fyshe Palmer, who visited his uncle in the prison hulk at Woolwich in 1794, was Member of Parliament for Reading from 1818 to 1834, when he retired.

== See also ==
- List of convicts transported to Australia
- Political Martyrs' Monument
