= Maurice Margarot =

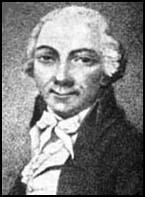
- Born: 1745; Devon, England
- Died: 1815 (aged 69–70); London, England
- Occupation: merchant
- Known for: London Corresponding Society, Scottish Martyrs

Maurice Margarot (1745–1815) is most notable for being one of the founding members of the London Corresponding Society, a radical society demanding parliamentary reform in the late eighteenth century.

== Early life ==
Maurice Margarot was the son of a wine and general merchant, also named Maurice, and his wife Catherine. Born in 1745, he lived most of his childhood in London, but his father's work caused the family to travel widely: he was baptized in Portugal at the British Factory Chaplaincy, in Lisbon, on 27 August 1749; educated at the University of Geneva in Switzerland. He and his father were both involved in a campaign to free John Wilkes from prison in 1769.

Margarot followed his father in business and political interest. Living in France during the French Revolution in 1789, Margarot had acquaintances among the revolutionary leaders. He was inspired (as well as further radicalized) by the French people and the revolution, and returned to England in 1792, where he followed Thomas Hardy into the London Corresponding Society to further the cause of reform. In May 1792, the Society elected Margarot as its chairman. Margarot's signature, along with Hardy's, were present on all the early publications by the London Corresponding Society, and this continued for several years. The publications called for fiscal and electoral reform as well as shorter parliaments. In November 1793, Margarot and Joseph Gerrald were chosen to attend the Edinburgh Convention organized by the Friends of the People Society - ostensibly a meeting for reformers, but seen as a threat and an attempt to establish an illegal government by William Pitt the Younger's ministry at the time. Margarot and Gerrald stood out during the debate and authorities selected them to be charged with sedition.

== Trial and transportation ==
In December 1793, Margarot was arrested and charged with involvement in seditious practices. The trial overseen by Thomas Elder in his capacity as Chief Magistrate of Edinburgh in January 1794 was notable due to mob demonstrations in Margarot's favor. At his trial, Margarot defended himself with a speech described by the judge, Lord Braxfield, as itself being "sedition". He was found guilty, and along with four other radicals (later known as the "Scottish Martyrs to Liberty") was transported to New South Wales in May 1794 in the convict ship Surprize.

Margarot was joined by his wife, but almost immediately a controversial and still mysterious set of events overtook the prisoners. Late in the voyage, Captain Patrick Campbell of the Surprize claimed to have been informed of a plan for mutiny and locked up several of the prisoners he was carrying, including Thomas Fyshe Palmer and William Skirving. The source for this claim was information provided by this ships' superintendent of convicts William Baker, a former marine who had taken a strong dislike to the four Scotsmen. Margarot was not locked up, and in his Narrative of the Sufferings of T.F. Palmer and William Skirving (1794) Palmer claimed that Margarot was in league with Campbell. No hearings were held, however, when the Surprize reached New South Wales later in the year.

== In New South Wales ==
Upon arriving in Sydney, Margarot at once demanded his freedom from Lieutenant-Governor Francis Grose. Maurice maintained that the process of transportation should discharge his sentence. His request was denied and although he had to remain in the colony, he was not liable for compulsory labour.

As a political prisoner, Margarot enjoyed more freedom than other convicts and with his wife started a small farm. In letters to Colonial Office and friends he criticized the colonial authorities of New South Wales and urged the British government to re-evaluate it. He was mentioned in a report of rebellion in September and October 1800 due to multiple claims of sedition. Margarot fell into further trouble with authorities, for example, claiming at several points to have been appointed by the British government to report on the mis-governance of the young penal colony. His home became a center for seditious events that included radical convicts and the Society of United Irishmen. Months later, Governor Philip Gidley King seized Margarot's papers, which contained republican sentiments, evidence of conspiracy with the Irish, and a forewarning of Australia succeeding America as a chief power in the world.

His most notable run-in was in 1804, when he was suspected of involvement in the Castle Hill Rebellion led by the United Irishmen. Shortly after this, he was briefly sent to hard labor at the Newcastle, New South Wales settlement. He arrived early in 1806. The following years until his return to England in 1810 are blank.

== Later life and death ==
Following his and his wife's return to England, Margarot served as a witness in Parliamentary hearings concerning mis-governance and corruption in New South Wales (such as that which led to the Rum Rebellion), and his own sentence that he claimed was unjust in length. He stood witness before the 1812 parliamentary committee on transportation, where he continued his pursuit against the officers from New South Wales.

He published two pamphlets upon his return to England that marked his return to an interest in British politics. The pamphlets are Thoughts on Revolution (Harlow, 1812) and Proposal for a Grand National Jubilee (Sheffield, nd). Both put forward old radical themes as well as how desirable it would be to base an economy on a local farmer and to restrict commerce to a minimum.

He died in December 1815 in extreme poverty, and under continued government suspicion as a pro-French radical. By that time, many domestic British radicals also held Margarot in suspicion, primarily because of Palmer's accusations concerning the mutiny.

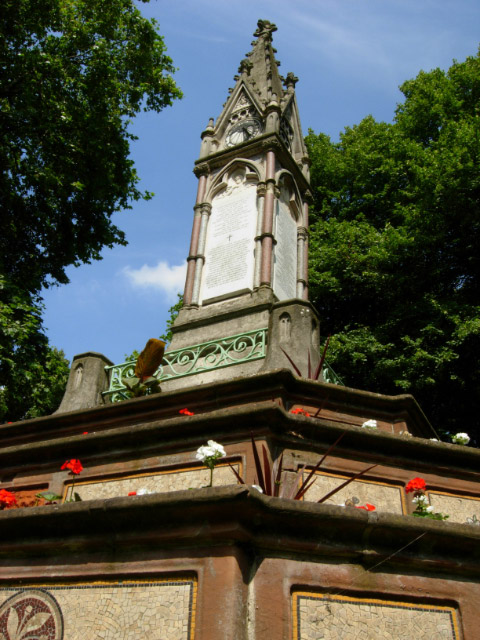
Burdett Coutts Memorial Sundial.

He was buried in Old St. Pancras Churchyard in London. His name is listed on Burdett Coutts memorial there amongst the interments with no marker.

== Reputation ==
In the early years of the Chartist movement, Francis Place and others (including, earlier, Thomas Hardy) sought to rehabilitate Margarot's reputation, as plans went forwards for monuments to the martyrs in Edinburgh, and in London. The monuments stand today at the Old Calton Burial Ground, on Calton Hill, Edinburgh, and in Nunhead Cemetery, London. The commemoration of the sacrifices made by Scottish Martyrs became a key touchstone of Chartist publicity.

== See also ==
- List of convicts transported to Australia
