= Society for Constitutional Information =

- Leader: John Horne Tooke
- Founder: John Cartwright
- Founded: 1780
- Dissolved: October 1794
- Preceded by: Bill of Rights Society
- Headquarters: Sheffield
- Ideology: Abolitionism; Classical liberalism Constitutionalism; Natural law Radicalism; Reformism
- Political position: Left-wing
- National affiliation: Radicals

The Society for Constitutional Information was a British activist group founded in 1780 by Major John Cartwright, to promote parliamentary reform and knowledge of the English constitution.

It was an organisation of social reformers, many of whom were drawn from the rational dissenting community, dedicated to publishing political tracts aimed at educating fellow citizens on their lost ancient liberties. It promoted the work of Thomas Paine and other campaigners for parliamentary reform. Most members of the Society for Constitutional Information were also opposed to the slave trade. It was particularly strong in Sheffield.

The Society flourished until 1783, but thereafter made little headway. The organisation promoted Thomas Paine's Rights of Man and other radical publications, and under the leadership of John Horne Tooke collaborated with other reform societies, metropolitan and provincial, such as the London Corresponding Society, with which it met in 1794 to discuss a further national convention as well as producing many pamphlets and periodicals. After the government repression and 1794 Treason Trials in October, in which the leaders were acquitted, the society ceased to meet.

== See also ==
- Radicalism (historical)
