= Otter (ship) =

Several ships have been named Otter for the marine mammal otter:

- Otter (1633 ship) was a Dutch privateering yacht.
- Otter (1795 ship) was a maritime fur trading vessel. Between 1795 and 1798 it visited the Pacific. It was most famous for the rescue of Thomas Muir, a famous Scottish political exile.
- Otter (1797 ship) was launched at Liverpool, initially as a West Indiaman. She made seven voyages as a slave ship and was lost in 1807 on her way back to Britain from her seventh slave voyage.
- Otter (1807 ship) was launched in America in 1799. She appeared in the Register of Shipping in 1809, after she had already made the first of three voyages as a whaler. She then started trading with the Mediterranean where the French captured her in 1813.

== See also ==
- HMS Otter, one of several ships of the British Royal Navy
  - HMQS Otter, a patrol and examination vessel of the Queensland Maritime Defence Force, and later the Royal Australian Navy
- SMS Otter, two ships of the Imperial German Navy
- USS Otter (DE-210), a destroyer escort of the United States Navy
- The Voyage of the otter, 1795–1797
