= Huntershill Village =

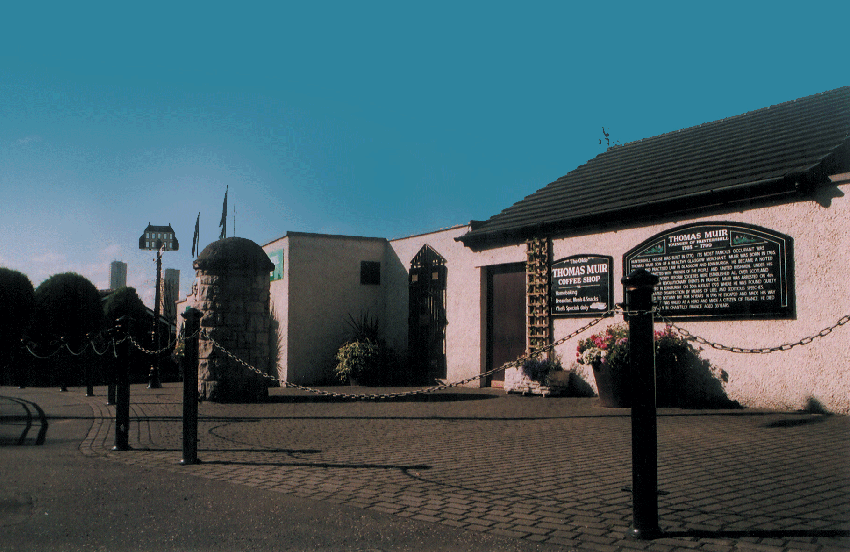
Huntershill Village, Crowhill Road pedestrian access

Huntershill Village is located opposite Huntershill House at the top of Crowhill Road in Bishopbriggs, East Dunbartonshire, Scotland. Over forty local businesses operate from the location. It was historically part of the Huntershill Estate, former residence of the political reformer Thomas Muir. It is also the former site of the Huntershill mining and freestone quarry.

A Cairn and Martyrs Gate dedicated to Muir and fellow martyrs from England and Scotland were erected at Huntershill Village by John SL Watson, and partly funded by the East Dunbartonshire Council.

Visitor facilities includes the Thomas Muir Coffee Shop, art gallery & classes, picture framer, pet and aquatic and garden/gift centre. On 3 September 2009 at 10 a.m., East Dunbartonshire's Provost Eric Gotts formally opened the Bishopbriggs Farmers Market which is held on the first Saturday of every month.

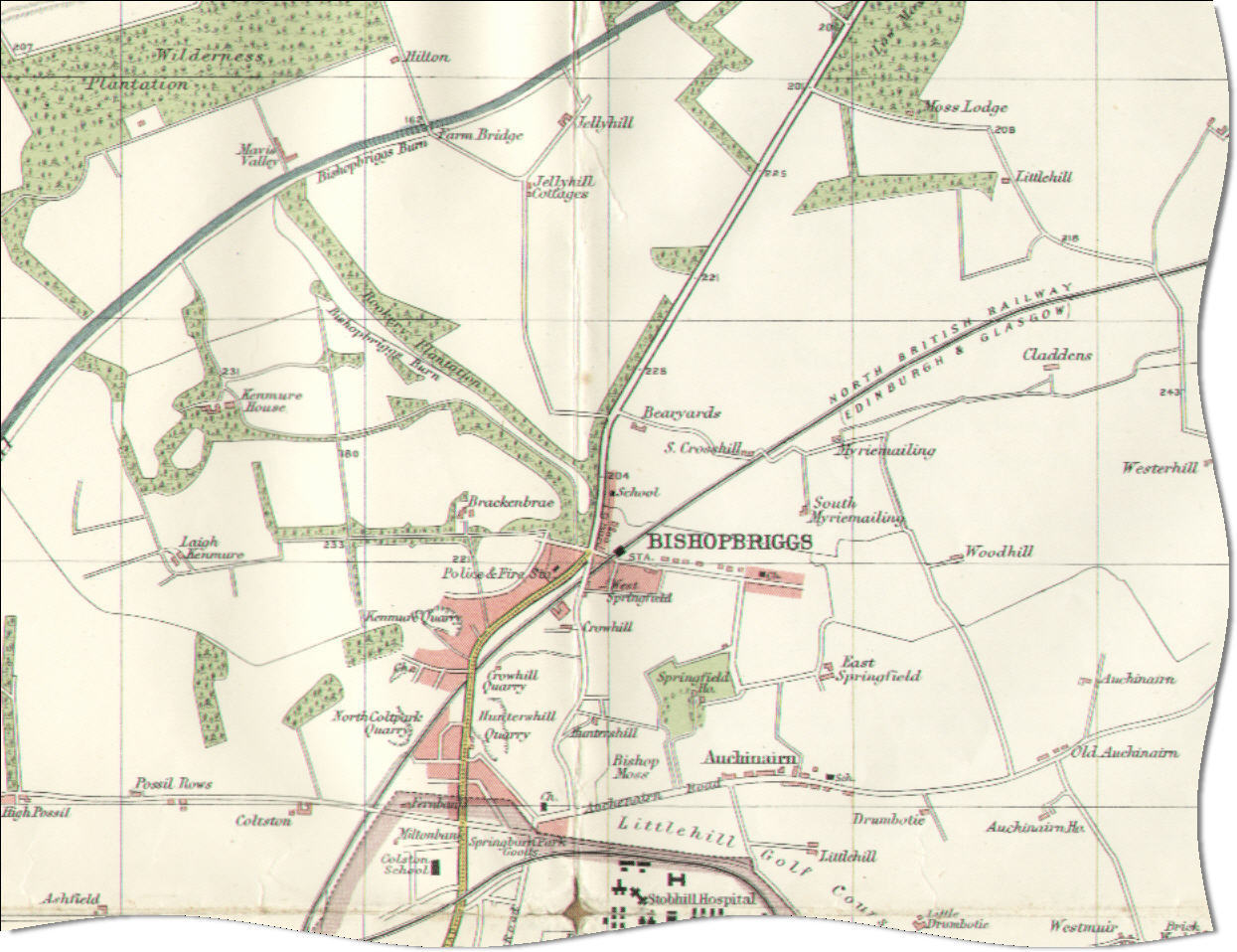
Map of Huntershill, shown to the south of Bishopbriggs, in 1923

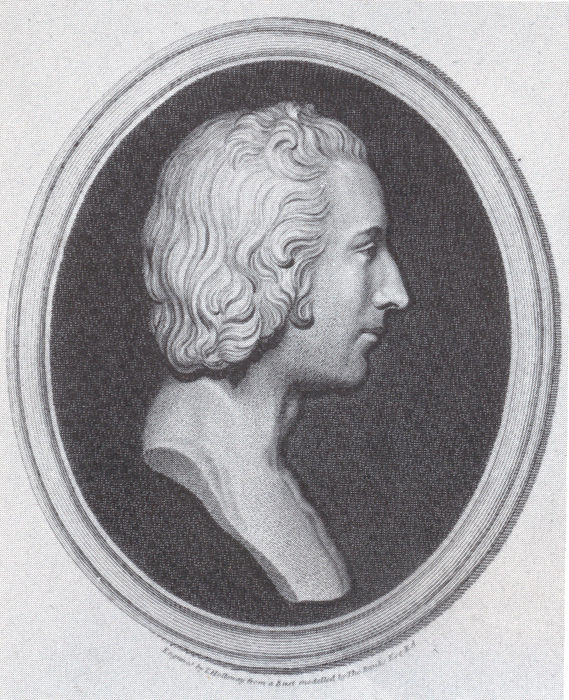
Thomas Muir

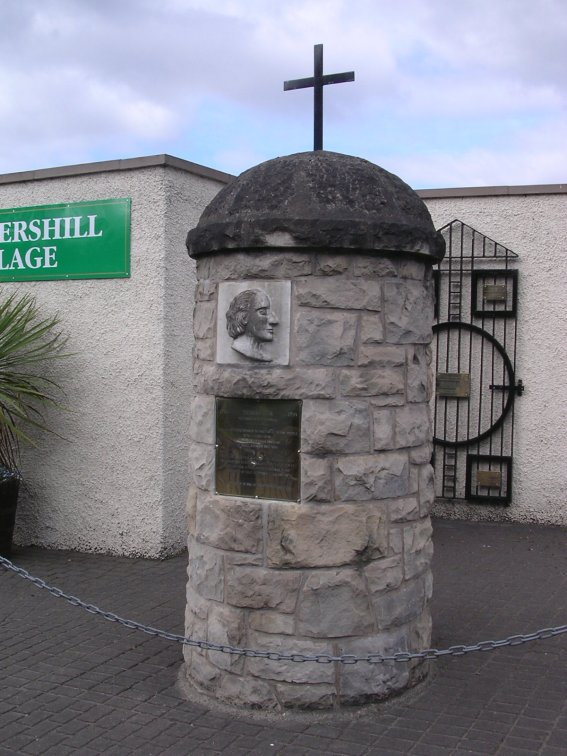
Thomas Muir Cairn - Erected by John SL Watson and unveiled by East Dunbartonshire's Provost John Dempsey (1997)

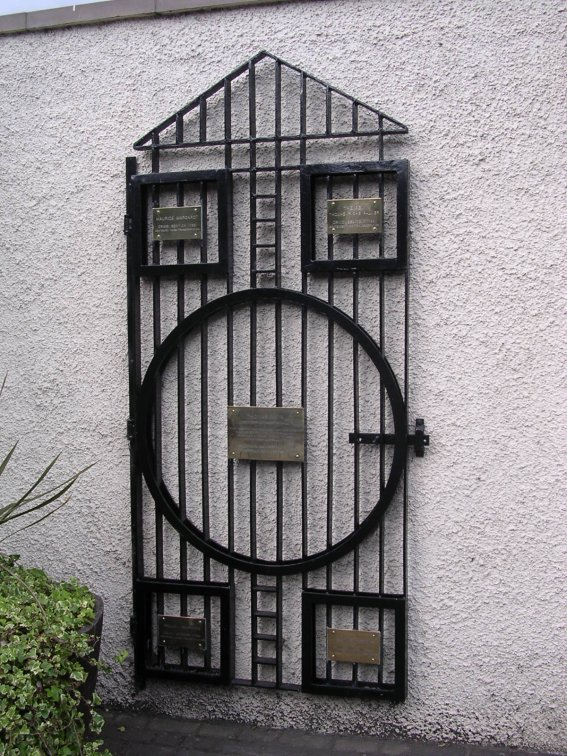
Scottish Political Martyrs Gate - Erected by John SL Watson and unveiled by East Dunbartonshire's Provost John Dempsey (1997)

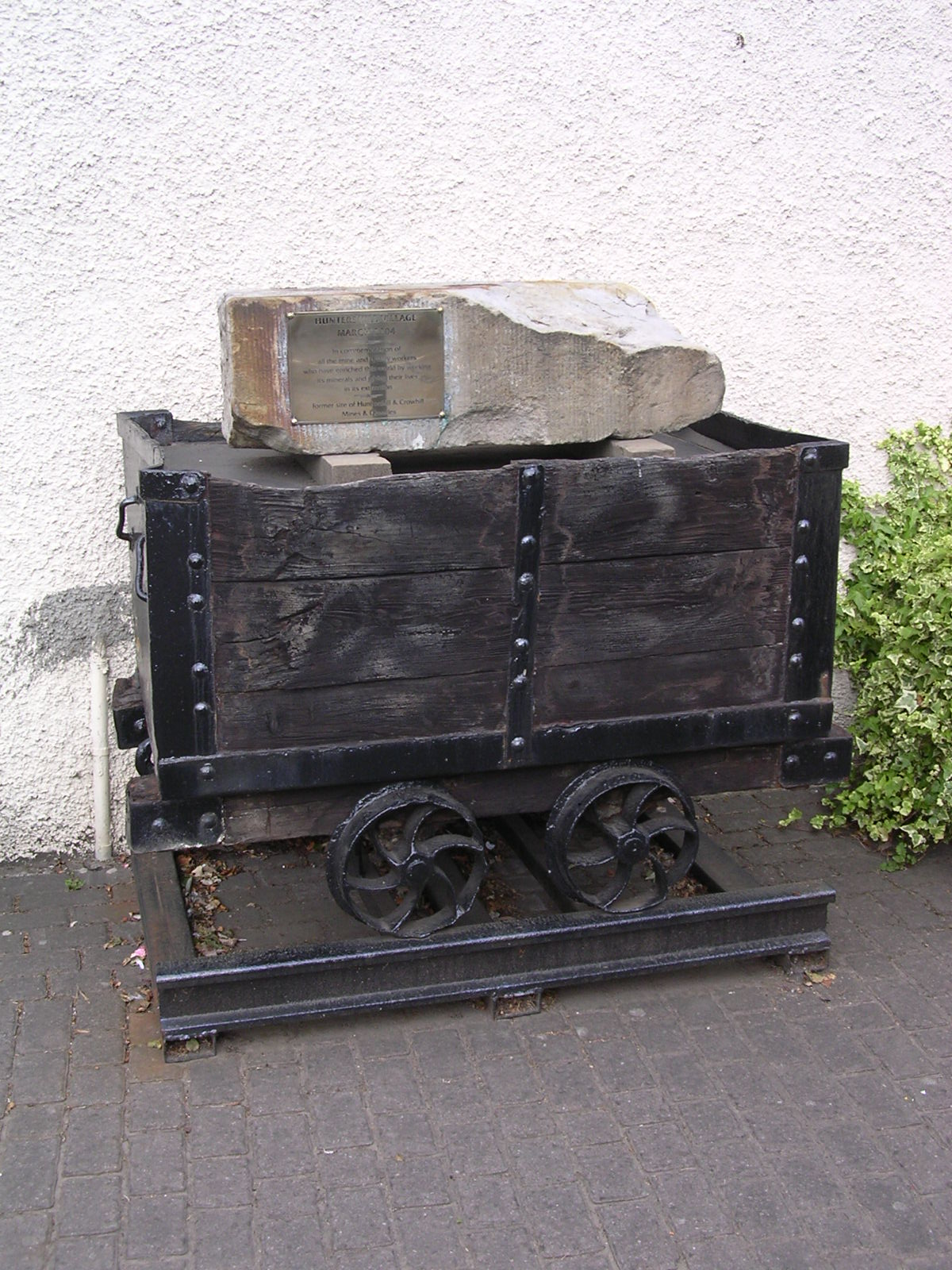
Miners of the world memorial hutch - created by John SL Watson and unveiled by leader of East Dunbartsonshire Council John Morrison (2003)

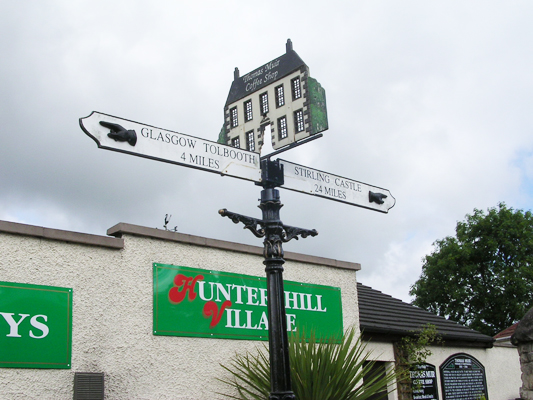
Finger Post marking the Old Glasgow-Stirling postal road

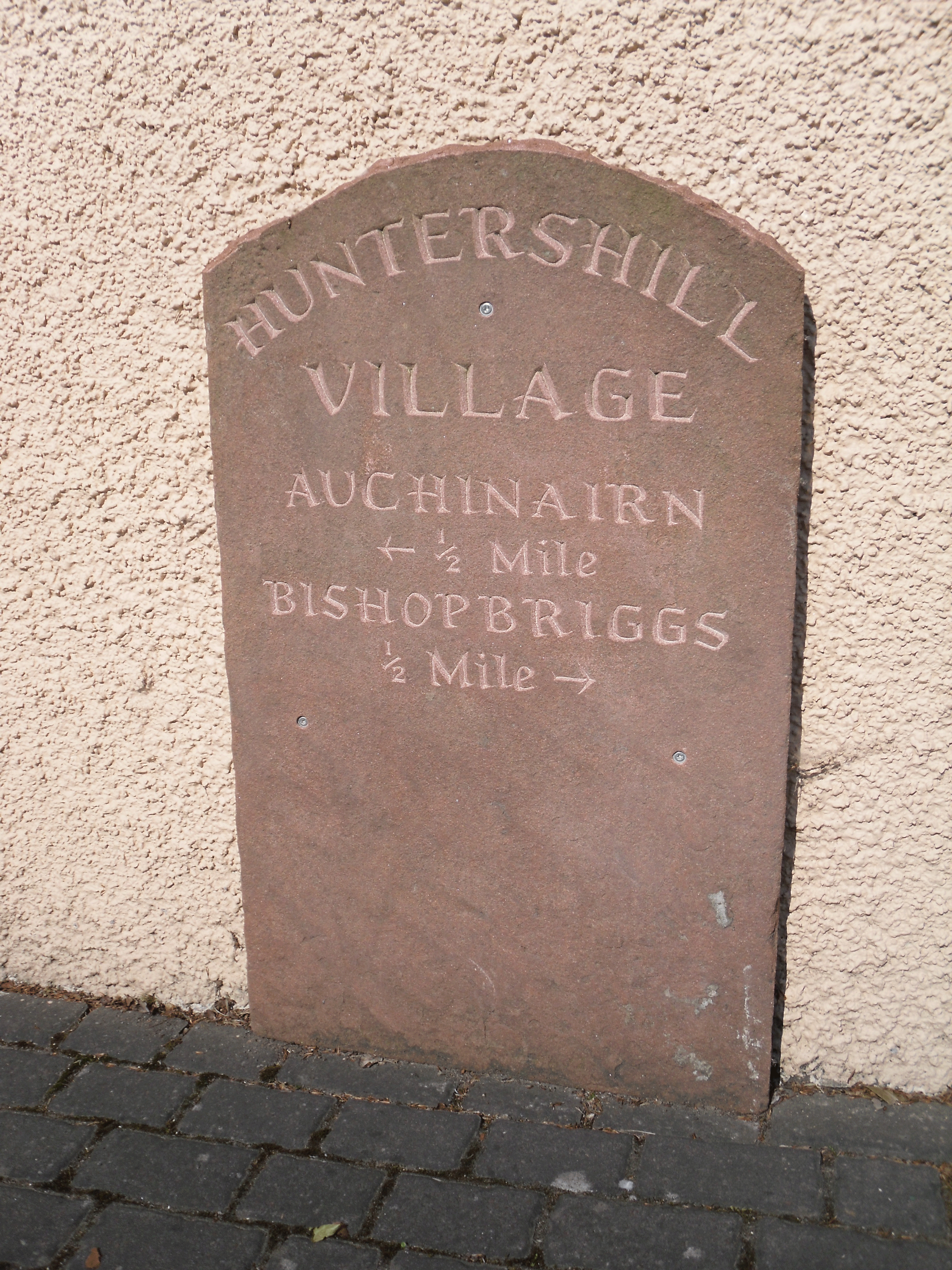
Huntershill Village Mile Stone
