= Gallant Schemer (1799 ship) =

Falmouth built sailing vessel

History

Great Britain
- Name: Gallant Schemer
- Namesake: (Note: Possibly the amatory song, The Gallant Schemer’s Petition to The Honourable Mrs. F——s, a song that dates to 1731.)
- Builder: Falmouth
- Launched: 1799
- Captured: 1813

General characteristics
- Tons burthen: 188, or 196, or 197 (bm)
- Armament: 1801:6 × 12-pounder carronades + 6 × 6-pounder & 3 × 4-pounder guns + 3 swivel guns; 1813:8 × 6-pounder + 2 × 6-pounder guns; 1813:12 × 9-pounder guns "of the New Construction"

Gallant Schemer was launched in 1799 at Falmouth. A French privateer captured her in 1805, but she was back in British hands by 1808. She then traded with South America and the Mediterranean. A French privateer captured her in 1813.

== Career ==
Gallant Schemer came into Bristol in July 1801 from Nevis. Tobin, Pinney, and Tobin put her up for sale a month later, advertising her as having been "altered at Falmouth last year". She sailed to Nevis with Snow, master, and was again advertised for sale, this time being advertised as "built at Falmouth about two years ago." Thomas King purchased her and advertised her as sailing for Surinam with Williams, master, in July 1804, and for Jamaica, in August 1805 with Gardner, master.

She first appeared in Lloyd's Register (LR) in 1803.

Year	Master	Owner	Trade	Source and notes
1803	J. Snow	G. Webb	Falmouth–Nevis	LR
1805	T.King; T. Gardner	T. King	Bristol–Surinam	LR
1806	Gardner	Captain & Co.	Bristol–Surinam	Register of Shipping (RS); annotated "captured"

In February 1806 Lloyd's List reported that Gallant Schemer, Gardner, master, had been captured while sailing from Bristol to Jamaica. Her captor had carried her into Guadeloupe.

However, Gallant Schemer returned to British ownership. Although there is no mention in Lloyd's List or the London Gazette of a recapture of a vessel by that name, Lloyd's Register for 1808 showed Gallant Schemer with Reach, master, Bourgoyne, owner, and trade London–Gibraltar. In December 1811, she was driven ashore at Sheerness, Kent, England, during a voyage from Smyrna, Greece, to London.

Year	Master	Owner	Trade	Source
1811	J. Smith; Worts	Burgoyne	London–Rio de Janeiro; London–Malta	LR
1812	Worts	Bourgoyne	London–Smyrna	LR
1814	Worts	Bourgoyne	London–Malta	LR; damages repaired in 1812

== Fate ==
On 1 October 1813 the French privateer Babiole, after a brief exchange of gunfire, captured Gallant Schemer, Clement Worts, master, which had been sailing from Smyrna. She had been carrying silk, "Near eastern antiques", gaiac wood, and sponges. Babiole brought her into Ajaccio, Corsica, on 11 November.
