= Babiole (1811 ship) =

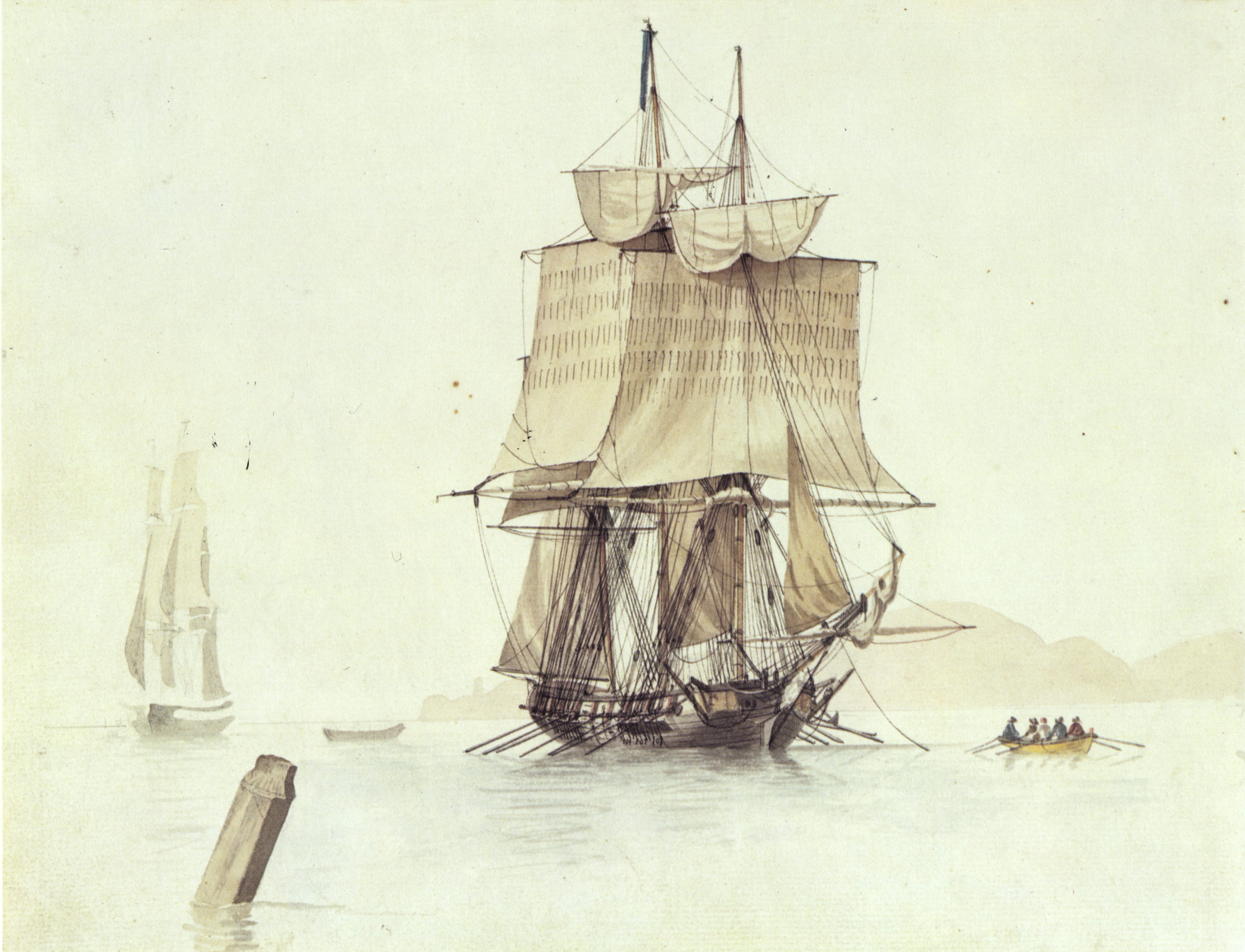
- Becalmed privateer, possibly Babiole. Artist: Antoine Roux

History

France
- Name: Babiole
- Namesake: Babiole
- Builder: La Ciotat
- Launched: 1811
- Captured: 1815

General characteristics
- Tons burthen: 330
- Propulsion: Sail

Babiole was a French privateer launched at La Ciotat in 1811. She made four cruises between 1811 and 1813 in the Mediterranean as a privateer, capturing a number of prizes. The British Royal Navy captured her in 1815. She might have been a balaou, a type of schooner.

== Career ==
On her first cruise, from 1811 to early 1812, Babiole, of Marseille, on 25 January 1811 captured Admiral Saumarez, of 120 tons. Admiral Saumarez had been sailing from Newfoundland with a cargo of fish when Babiole captured her off Alicante. Admiral Saumarez arrived at Agde on 2 February.

Babiole's second cruise took place from about March 1812 to later in the year. Babiole sailed from Frioul on 18 February 1812 and proceeded to take a number of prizes. On 24 February she captured a Spanish brig carrying salt fish from Alicante to Majorca. Then on 9 March, Babiole captured the English brig Malta, which was coming from Palma. Babiole took her cargo of three bales of silk and let Malta proceed. On 16 March, Babiole captured the Spanish vessel Nuestra Senora de Carmes, which had been carrying paper and brandy from Vila Nova to Cadiz. Babiola sent her to Barcelona. That same day Babiole captured the English bombard Gibraltar, which had been sailing from Gibraltar to Majorca, but could not take possession as a British warship appeared in sight. Lastly Babiole captured the English brig Commerce, which was carrying coffee, soldiers' clothing, and merchandise. Commerce had come from London and was in a convoy sailing to Malta and Messina when Babiole captured her. Babiole sent Commerce into Toulon.

Babiole's third cruise, which was under the command of Jean-Joseph Roux and commissioned by Balguerie the Elder from Marseille, took place between December 1812 and March 1813. On 1 December Babiole captured Sisters, which was sailing from London to Malta. Sisters arrived at Ajaccio on 13 December. Sisters was a 12-gun three-masted ship, under William Young, with 20 (or 30), crew members and 3 passengers that ferried sugar, coffee, and various other goods. (Note: Sisters, of 253 tons burthen, had been built at Hull in 1802. She had been trading between London and Malta.) On 21 January 1813, Babiole captured the 2-gun British brig St Jean Baptiste, Francesco Nadeslech, master, which was sailing from Majorca to Alicante without a cargo, and released her as a cartel. (Note: Saint Juan Baptista, of 94 tons burthen, had been built at Bilbao in 1799. She had a crew of 12 men.)

Captain Roux again commanded Babiole on her fourth cruise, which took place between October 1813 to January 1814. On 1 October, Babiole, after a brief exchange of gunfire, captured the British merchant corvette Gallant Schemer, Clement Worts, master, which had been sailing from Smyrna. She had been loading silk, "Near eastern antiques", gaiac wood, and sponges. Babiole brought her into Corsica on 11 November. On 5 November Babiole captured the British brig Vigilant, Guillaume (William?) Fowler, master, of 14 men, which was sailing from Smyrna to Liverpool loaded with alizarin and wood. Babiole took Vigilant into Genoa. (Note: Vigilant, of 211 tons (bm), had been built in Scarborough in 1805. She was armed with four 4-pounder guns and six 12-pounder carronades,)

Next, Babiole captured the British schooner London Packet, Richard Holman, master, which had been sailing from Palermo to London with a load of oil, macaron, and anchovies described as low in value in French logs. Babiole plundered London Packet and then released her. She carried two guns and a 10-man crew. Roux transferred the prisoners of Gallant Schemer and Vigilant to London Packet and released her as a cartel; she arrived at Milford in December 1814. (Note: London Packet, of 119 tons (bm), had been launched at Glückstadt in 1806.)

Babiole captured the British merchant corvette Otter, Benjamin Francis, master, on 26 November 1813 as Otter was sailing back to London from Smyrna with a load of dried fruits. Otter arrived at Toulon on 5 December. She had a 14-man crew and 6 guns.

== Fate ==
On 1 May 1815, during the Hundred Days, Babiole was returning to Bordeaux from Martinique when HMS Menai detained her. Babiole arrived at Portsmouth on 21 May 1815. The capture took place in the Bay of Biscay and her cargo reportedly was worth £30,000.

Babiole was released.
