= Pierre François Péron =

French sailor

French Captain Pierre François Péron, born in 1769 at Lambézellec, near Brest, was a French sailor and trading captain who sailed to many different locations in the late 18th century. He owned his ship until it was captured by the British, following which he became a sealer and adventurer.

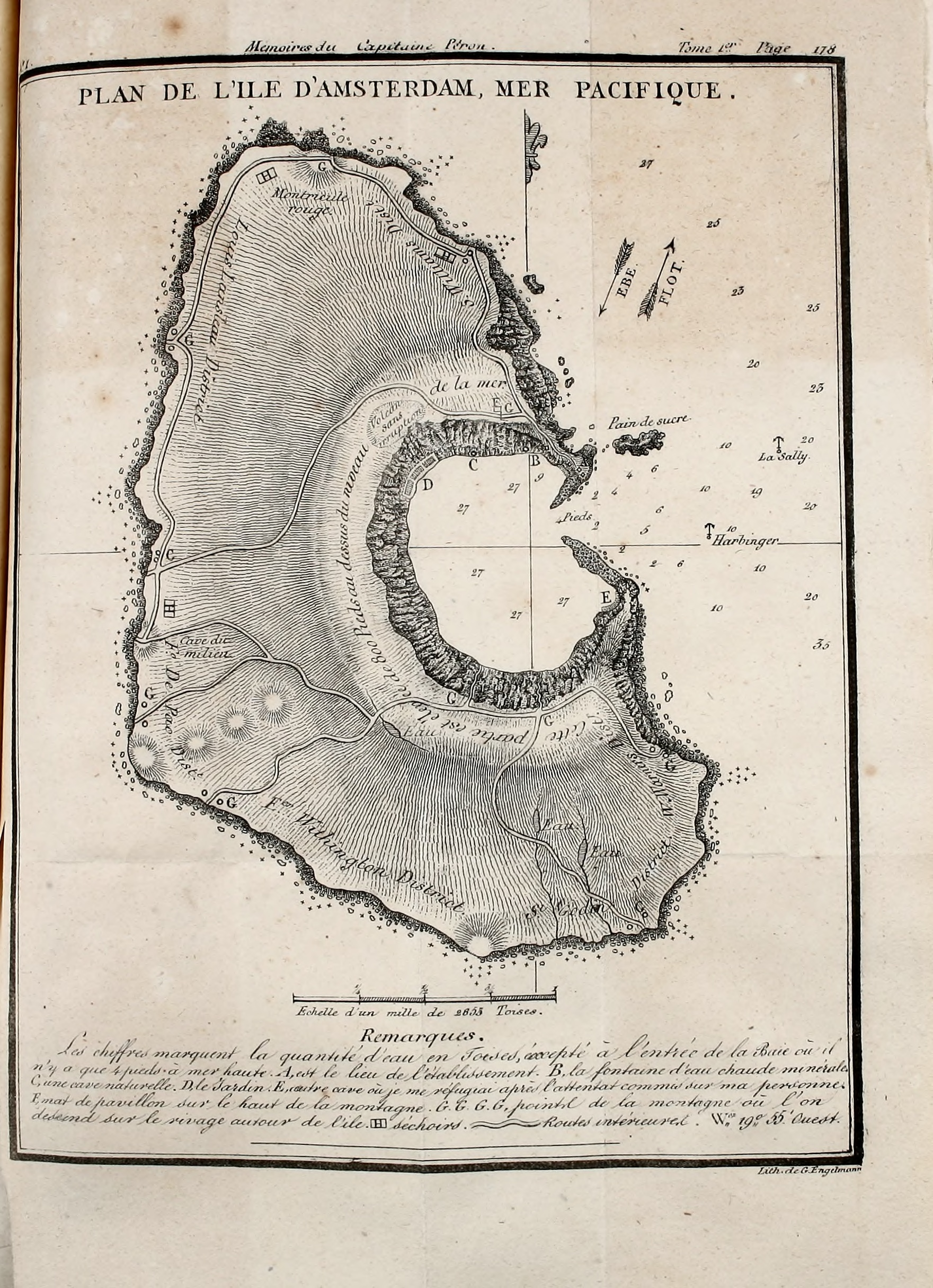
Péron's map of Île Saint-Paul, described by Charles Vélain as remarkably accurate

Captain Péron reports that he was marooned three years (from 1792 to 1795) on New Amsterdam Island or Île Amsterdam. He wrote an account about being marooned for 40 months gathering sealskins on that lonely Southern Indian Ocean island. There was confusion in the early days between Amsterdam and Saint Paul Islands, and it is clear that the island is the one now known as Saint Paul. In February 1793 Sir George Staunton was on his way to China on Lion as secretary to the Macartney embassy on the East Indiaman Hindostan. At Île Amsterdam they found a sealer named Perron and 4 others on the southern of the two islands, now called Saint Paul Island.

Later, Lion captured the French ship Emélie, the vessel that had landed the sealers. Deprived of the ship that had landed them, Péron and his men spent some 40 months marooned on the island until Captain Thomas Hadley, in Ceres, rescued them in late 1795 and took them to Port Jackson.

After being rescued, Péron travelled via Tasmania to the convict settlement at Sydney Cove. While in Sydney Péron found that the store of seal skins he left behind had been brought in the American maritime fur trade ship Otter. He negotiated with the captain, Ebenezer Dorr ("Dawes") and was given the post of first officer until the skins were sold in China. Otter then engaged in the sealskin and fur transport from the American Pacific coast to China. While leaving Sydney, Péron assisted in the escape of Thomas Muir of Huntershill, a Scottish lawyer tried in 1793 in Edinburgh for sedition and sentenced to transportation to New South Wales in 1794. Péron's chronicles describe the escape and the voyage across the Pacific.

The Otter then became the first known European merchant vessel to visit Tonga where several escaped convicts landed. After sighting Niue, the Otter reached Pukapuka on 3 April 1796. Peron, Thomas Muir and a small party landed ashore but the inhabitants did not allow them to inspect the island. Trading later took place near the ship as adzes, mats and other artifacts were exchanged for knives and European goods.

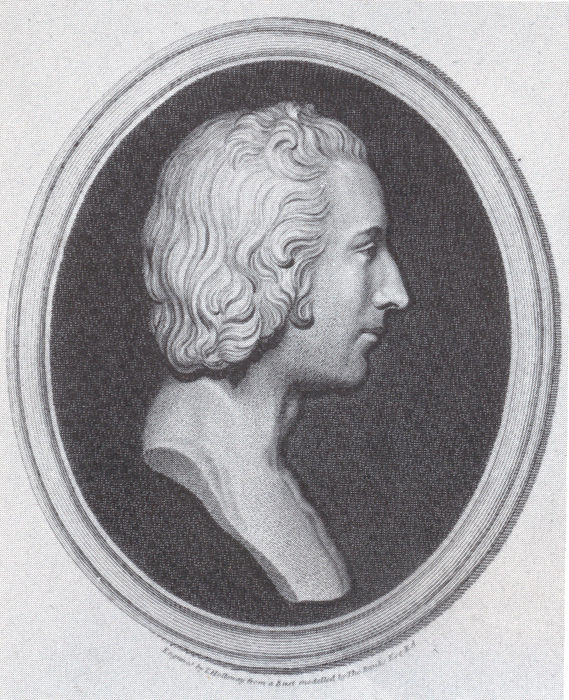
Thomas Muir

This island was given the name "Isles de la Loutre" (Otter Islands) by Péron: "Everything united to convince us that we had the right to attribute to ourselves the honour of having discovered three new islands; and with this conviction I gave them the name of Otter Islands [Isles de la Loutre] which was the name of our vessel. In order to distinguish them we named the eastern one 'Peron and Muir' (Motu Ko), the one to the north 'Dorr' (Pukapuka), and the name of 'Brown' (Motu Kotowa) was given to the third, after one of our officers." Peron

From Pukapuka the Otter sailed to Nootka Sound where furs were obtained and Muir was transferred to the Spanish vessel Sutil under José Tobar y Tamariz and taken to Monterey where he was received by governor Diego Borica. In his accounts, Péron writes about the Pacific Northwest and its natives, as well as an interesting account about the Hawaiian Islands. Most notable is a visit to California, by then a Spanish colony, including a stay at Monterey in 1796. This was the first time an American ship stopped in California. Péron found Monterey somewhat backward at the time.

Péron then travelled to San Blas, Mexico City, Veracruz, Havana, and Cádiz, finally reaching France.

In 1804 Péron retired to his chateau in Piage. He was appointed mayor in 1805 and again in 1815, but in 1825 he settled in Saumur, where he became first deputy mayor until 1830.

Péron's Memoires, in which he describes his survival alone on Île Amsterdam, were published in a limited edition and are now an expensive collector's item. His account contains notes on British Columbia, Vancouver Island, and the Queen Charlotte Islands, descriptions of California, particularly of his visit to Monterey in 1796, Tasmania and New South Wales in Australia, Hawaii and Sumatra. His memoires include descriptions of storms, shipwrecks, as well as situations of misery and hardship of all kinds. Péron’s memoirs are well written and describe many interesting events in the life of a sea captain who travelled in most of the then still little-known world where Western commerce was fast developing.

Péron died in 1846 at Luynes.
