= Jean-Joseph Roux =

French privateer

Jean-Joseph Roux (Marseille, 1768 — Odessa, 1817) was a French privateer.

== Career ==
Roux became captain in 1809. He captained ships in six commerce raiding cruises: three on Jean Bart, one on Payan-Latour, and two on Babiole, totalling 21 prizes.
