= Swan (1808 ship) =

UK whaler and merchantman 1808–1833

History

Denmark-Norway
- Builder: Flensburg
- Launched: 1806
- Fate: 1808 transferred to British ownership

United Kingdom
- Name: Swan
- Namesake: Swan
- Owner: 1808:Charles, Samuel & George Enderby; 1810:John Shuttleworth; 1812:William Randall; 1813:William Shelton Barnett; 1819:Skelton; 1823:Samuel Enderby & Sons; 1827:Gutteridge
- Acquired: c.1808
- Fate: Last listed 1833

General characteristics
- Tons burthen: 154 (bm)
- Armament: 1808: 2 × 6-pounder guns; Later: 4 × 9-pounder carronades

Swan was launched at Flensburg in 1806. By 1808 Samuel Enderby & Sons had acquired her. Between 1808 and 1810 she made one whaling voyage during which she rediscovered Bouvet Island. The Enderbys sold her and from 1811 on she traded widely. Then in 1823 the Enderbys repurchased her and she made two more whaling voyages for them, this time on a reconnaissance voyage to the waters around and north of the Seychelles. Although she herself was not very successful, her reports of abundant whales resulted in other whalers exploiting a new whaling ground. The Enderbys sold her again and she then became a West Indiaman. She was last listed in 1833.

== Career ==
Whaling voyage #1 (1808–1810): Captain James Lindsay sailed from England on 10 June 1808. Swan was in company with another Enderby whaler, Otter, Thomas Hopper, master. Lloyd's List reported on 26 July 1808 that Otter, Hopper, master, and Swan, Lindsay, master, had been at Madeira on 27 June on their way to the South Seas.

Swan rediscovered Bouvet Island on 4 October, with Otter arriving some three days later. They recorded the island's position but were unable to land because of the ice.

Swan returned to Gravesend on 14 August 1810 from Ascension Island.

Some sources report that Swan made two more whaling voyages, one in 1811 under Captain John Shuttleworth, and one in 1812 under Captain William Randall, but this is incorrect.

The Register of Shipping for 1811 showed Swan's master changing from J. Lindsay to Shuttleworth, her ownership from Enderbys to "Capt.", and her trade from London–Southern Fishery to London–"Gilota".

Swan, Shuttleworth, master, arrived at Gravesend on 1 February 1811 from Gibraltar. She was listed among the transports that sailed from Gravesend on 13 March, bound for Lisbon. She was among the transports reported to have arrived at Lisbon between 23 March and 5 April. From Lisbon she sailed on to San Domingo via Madeira, where she arrived on 18 May. On 22 September she was at Portsmouth, and by 29 November she was back at Gravesend from Saint Domingo. On 6 December Swan, Shuttleworth, master, sailed for Porto; on 25 December she arrived back at Gravesend from Porto. On 27 April 1812 Swan, Shuttleworth, master, was back at Gravesend from Porto.

The Register of Shipping for 1813 showed Swan with W. Randall, master, W. Barnett, owner, and trade London–St Michael's. While sailing for Barnett Swan had various masters and sailed to such places as A Coruña, Fayal, Gothenburg, Malaga, Petersburg, Ribadeo, Rio de Janeiro, and Valencia.

Lloyd's Register for 1819 showed Swan with D.T. Lyon, master, Skelton, owner, and trade London–Havana. The Register of Shipping gave the owner's name as Crosby.

The Register of Shipping and Lloyd's Register for 1824 both showed Swan with Enderbys. owner, and trade London–Southern Fishery. The Register of Shipping showed her master as Malcolm, and Lloyd's Register showed him as M'Lean. Samuel Enderby sent Swan on a reconnaissance voyage.

Whaling voyage #2 (1823–1825): Captain McLean (or Richard McKean) sailed from England on 4 June 1823, bound for the Seychelles. Swan returned on 3 May 1825 with 200 casks (or 40 tuns), of whale oil. She apparently was the first whaler to discover the whaling grounds off the Seychelles. Her lack of success was due to a number of misfortunes that prevented the crew from fully taking advantage of the number of whales that had been sighted. The Seychelles grounds, which extended from the islands towards the Arabian peninsula, proved productive for the other whalers that subsequently went there, and it was much closer to Britain than the Japan grounds.

Whaling voyage #3 (1825–1827): Captain McKean or McLean sailed on 10 June 1825, again bound for the Seychelles. Swan returned on 10 January 1827 with 250 casks of whale oil.

Lloyd's Register for 1827 showed Swan's master changing from M'Kean to R. Free, her owner from Enderbys to Gutteridge, and her trade from London–South Seas to London–Saint Thomas. The Register of Shipping for 1828 showed her master as Free, her owner as King, and her trade as London–Barbados.

== Fate ==
Swan was last listed in the registers in 1833. Lloyd's Register showed her with R. Free, master, Gutteridge, owner, and trade London–Saint Thomas. The Register of Shipping showed her with Free, master, King, owner, and trade London–Barbados.
