= Huntershill House =

18th-century house in Scotland

Coordinates: 55°53′57.69″N 4°13′34.52″W

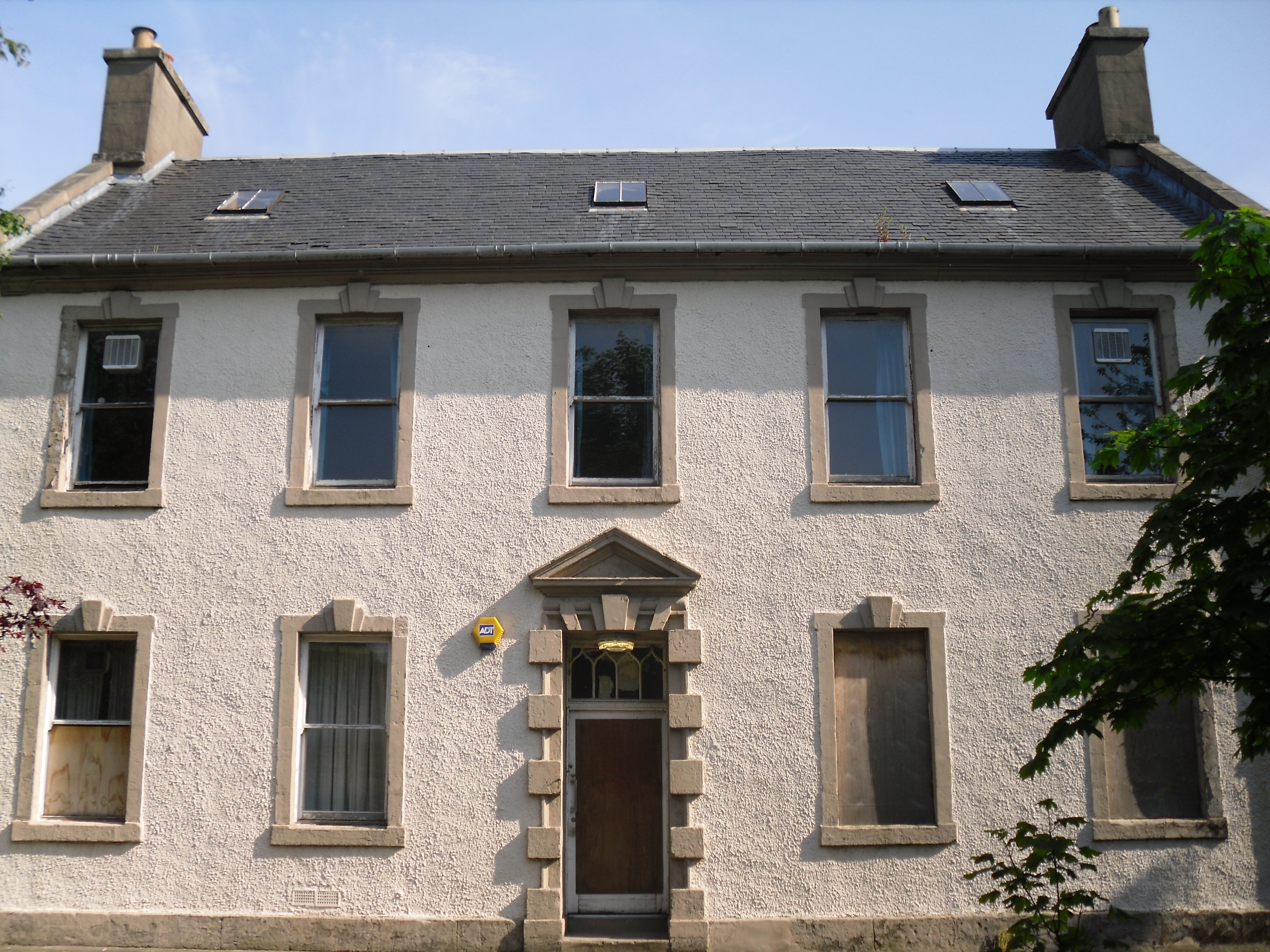
Huntershill House in 2009

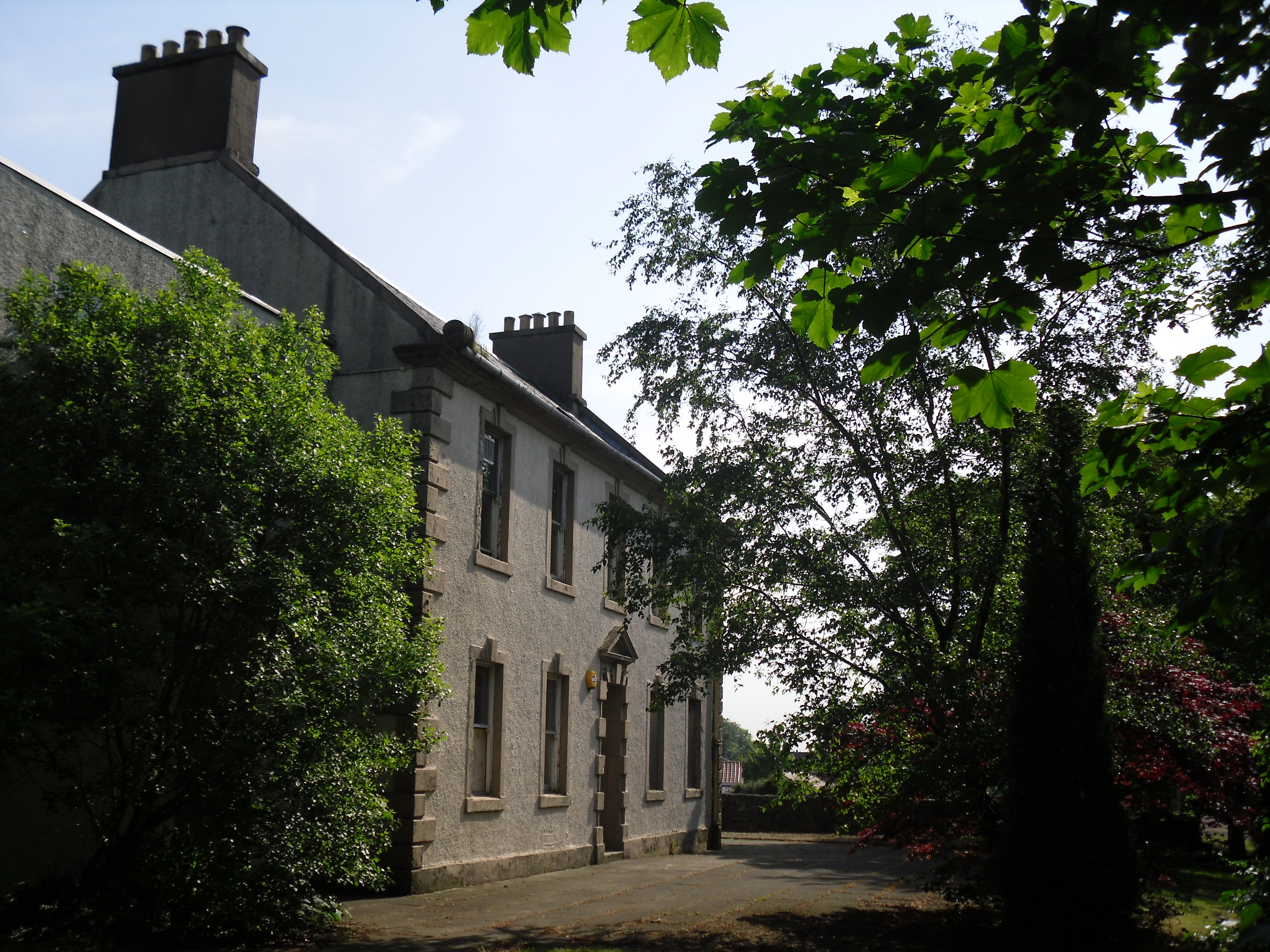
Huntershill House in 2009

Huntershill House is a classic example of an 18th-century Laird's house, built c.1769-1781, designed by an unknown architect. The lands of Huntershill were formerly part of the lands of Auchinairn owned by James Lyle; "his circumstances having become embarrassed his Lands of Auchinairn were sold by his Creditors by Public Roup in several lots" on the 15th day of October 1748. From the 1780s it was the family home of the political reformer Thomas Muir, Younger of Huntershill (1765–1799).

Auchinairn is now closely entwined with Bishopbriggs, East Dunbartonshire, Scotland. Huntershill house is currently owned by East Dunbartonshire Council, and is a category B listed building, unfortunately during their ownership the building has fallen into disrepair and has ended up being listed on the Buildings at Risk Register for Scotland.

== History ==
=== Tenants ===
Huntershill house was built by a Glasgow merchant named James Martin. It was situated beside the old post road from Glasgow to Stirling (Crowhill Road) which, however, ceased to be a main road during the 1790s when the Inchbelly Turnpike trustees built a new road on the present Kirkintilloch Road alignment.

In August 1781 the house was advertised for sale along with other property belonging to Martin, who had recently died. The following year it was purchased by James Muir, father of Thomas, and became the family home for some time afterwards. James Muir advertised the house for sale in December 1798, when it was said to consist of "a Kitchen, nine Fire-rooms, besides Garret-rooms, Closets, and two sunk Cellars". James Muir died in 1801 and the house was sold by his Trustees to the Gallaway family.

The house passed through the hands of many different occupiers but remained in the ownership of the Gallaway family from 1803 until 1953, when it was sold by the Gallaway Trustees to Mrs. Olive McGilvray with the following burdens:

"(Fifth) In order to ensure the preservation of the existing buildings of Huntershill House and the policy ground thereof as an ancient monument in the national interest, the structure of Huntershill House will not be altered nor will the policy ground be altered or built upon but the policy ground shall remain open and unbuilt upon unless the consent of the National Trust for Scotland be first obtained in writing to any proposed alteration of the said Huntershill House or to any alteration or erection on said policy ground and no building or erection shall be placed on and no operation of any kind be carried on upon any part of the ground hereby disponed which lies outwith said policy which would affect the amenity of Huntershill House and policy ground as an ancient monument"

=== Council Ownership ===
In 1969 the newly formed Bishopbriggs Town Council decided to purchase it to serve as a pavilion for the adjacent recreation ground, then subject to the new development plans. The conversion would involve a total re-modelling of the interior of the house, which had not changed much since Muir's time, and the construction of a two-storey extension. The council was allowed to carry out these drastic alterations since the house was not listed at the time even although it was sold with the burdens in place:

"ALL and WHOLE that area of ground containing one acre and ninety six decimal or one thousandth parts of an acre of ground, part of three acres and six decimal or one-tenth parts of an acre of ground or thereby Imperial Standard Measure, bounded on west-southwest, west and west-northwest by Crowhill Road, in the Parish of Cadder, more particularly described in a Disposition by us the said James William McGilvray and the said Mrs. Olive Millicent Cant or McGilvray in favour of James Gray Provan dated Eighth April and recorded in the said Division of the General Register of Sasines on Fourteenth May both in the year Nineteen hundred and sixty four; together with the subjects Huntershill House erected thereon, the parts, privileges and pertinents thereof and the whole right, title and interest of me and my said consenter present and future therein; But always. with and under in so far as still subsisting and applicable and not implemented, departed from or discharged the burdens, reservations, servitudes, conditions, declarations and others specified or contained in the said Disposition by Norman Macleod and Others as Trustees therein-mentioned and Others in favour of the said Mrs. Olive Millicent Cant or McGilvray"

The conversion was accomplished during 1969-70 and was formally handed over by the contractor on 13 November of the latter year. On 15 May 1975 a small museum of Thomas Muir memorabilia was opened in a room on the upper floor of the house. The museum is now housed in Bishopbriggs Library and includes a magnificent bust of Muir by Scottish artist and sculptor Alexander Stoddart.

== Present ==
A large section of the grounds of Huntershill House are now used as an athletics track and there are three football pitches. Local youth football clubs Rossvale BC and Rossvale Thistle use the pitches and facilities as their home venue. The garden and grounds immediately around the house are currently being redeveloped for housing development.
