= Thomas Muir of Huntershill =

Scottish political reformer

Thomas Muir
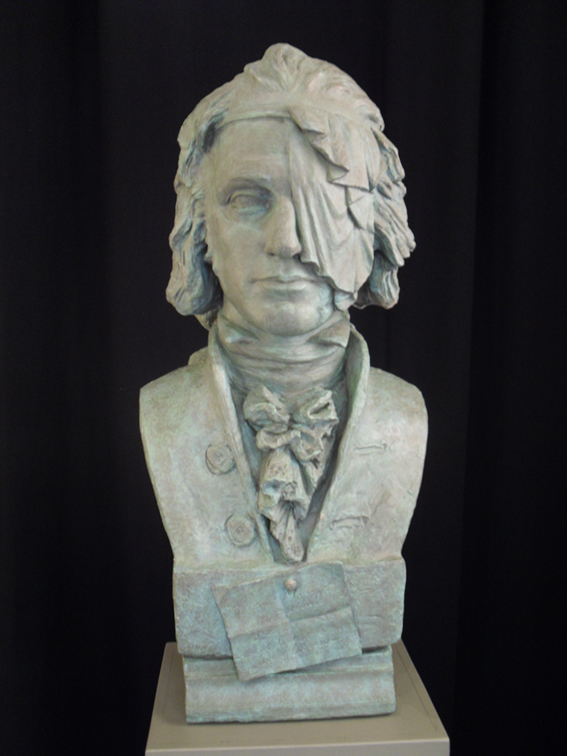
- Thomas Muir depicted after being injured (bust by Alexander Stoddart)
- Born: 24 August 1765; Glasgow, Scotland
- Died: 25 January 1799 (aged 33); Chantilly, France
- Occupation: Lawyer
- Known for: Friends of the People; Political Martyrs' Monument

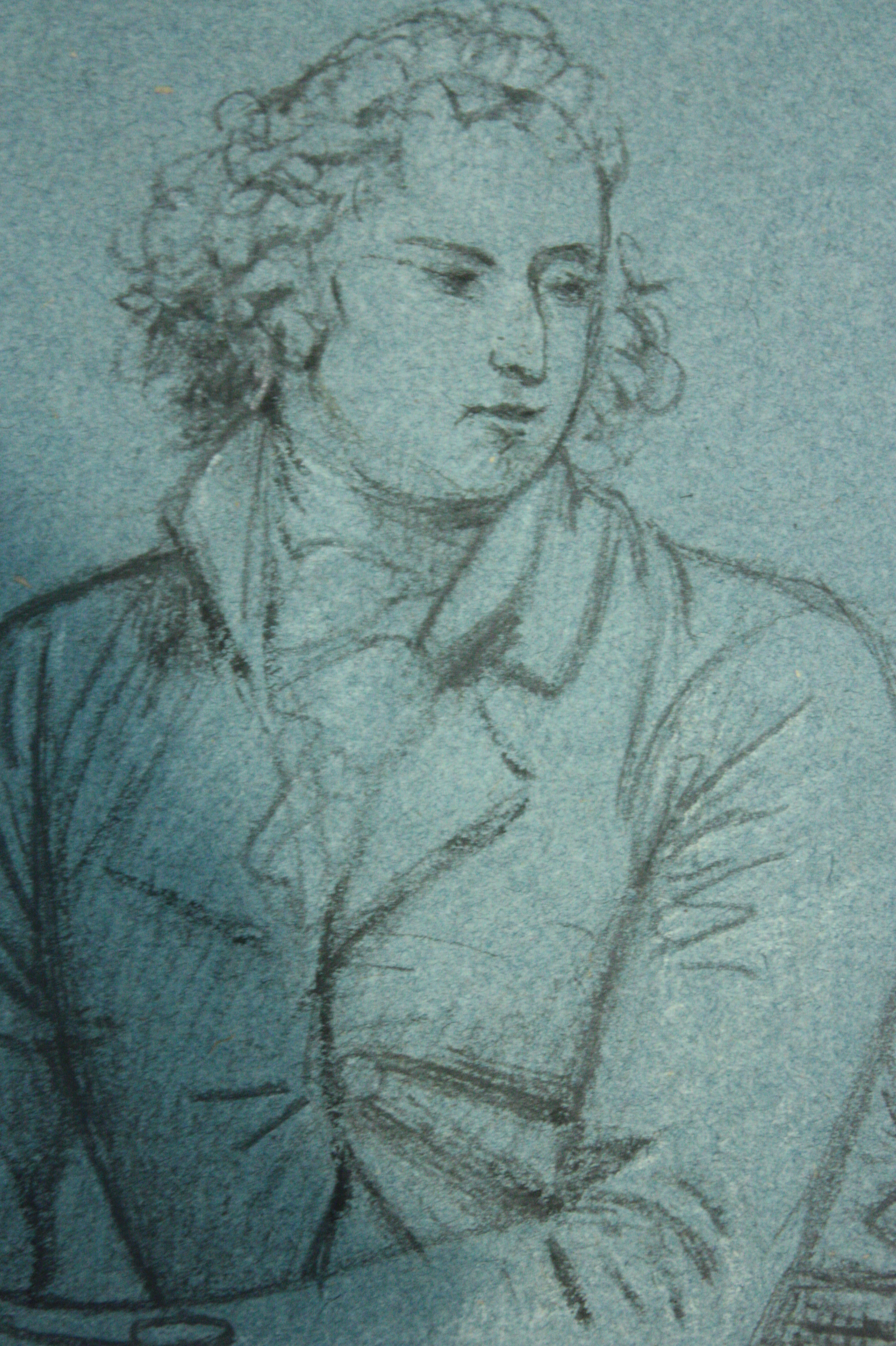
Thomas Muir of Hunters Hill by David Martin, 1790, chalk drawing from life, National Portrait Gallery of Scotland

Thomas Muir (24 August 1765 – 25 January 1799), also known as Thomas Muir the Younger of Huntershill, was a Scottish political reformer and lawyer. Muir graduated from Edinburgh University and was admitted to the Faculty of Advocates in 1787, aged 22. Muir was a leader of the Society of the Friends of the People. He is included in the Political Martyrs' Monument in Edinburgh.

In 1793 Muir was sentenced to transportation to Botany Bay Australia for sedition. Two years later in 1796, Muir escaped from Botany Bay on the American ship Otter. The Otter reached Nootka Sound, Vancouver Island in June 1796. From there Muir travelled to Mexico City, where he asked to be allowed to travel to California. On April 1797 Muir was imprisoned in Havana, Cuba and taken by Spanish ship Ninfa to Spain. On arrival at Cádiz, the Spanish ship became engaged in a battle with two Royal Navy warships that were blockading the harbour. Muir received a glancing blow to his face from shrapnel, which smashed his left cheek and injured his eyes. The Spanish captain insisted that Muir was among the dead, and he was so badly disfigured that his would-be captors failed to identify him, and he was sent ashore with the wounded. Now began a long and painful recovery while the French and Spanish authorities indulged in a bitter diplomatic wrangle over Muir's release. In September 1797, the Spanish government released Muir and he made his way to France.

In November 1797, he arrived in Bordeaux, where he was hailed as a 'Hero of the French Republic'. Muir then traveled to Paris. Muir's confidant in 1798 was Dr Robert Watson and Muir learned of the United Scotsmen, which replaced the Friends of the People. In November 1798, Muir moved to the Île-de-France village of Chantilly. He died there on 25 January 1799. Shortly before his death, he said, "we have achieved a great duty in these critical times. After the destruction of so many years, we have been the first to revive the spirit of our country and give it a National Existence."

== Early years ==
Thomas Muir was born above his father's grocers shop on the High Street of Glasgow. His father, James Muir, was the son of the 'bonnet laird' of Birdston in Milton of Campsie, he married Margaret Smith and they had two children Thomas and Janet. As a younger son James Muir had little prospect of inheriting his father's property. His family, however, had in Maidstone, Kent, relations who were prosperous hop-growers and it was towards this branch of trade that young James was persuaded to direct his energies. In this business venture he achieved considerable success and by the time of his marriage in 1764 he was firmly established as a hop-merchant in the High Street of Glasgow. Here, in the heart of the town's ancient University quarter, he settled with his wife, living in a little flat above his shop.

By all accounts., Muir senior was a man of some education, whose interest in commerce extended far beyond that of his fellow businessmen, for he has been credited with the authorship of a pamphlet on 'England's Foreign Trade'. In the 1780s he purchased the property of Huntershill House, together with adjoining lands. Of Muir's mother, Margaret Smith, nothing of a biographical nature has been recorded. However, it is known that both Muir's parents were orthodox Presbyterians, consequently young Thomas's early upbringing was very much within the confines of the rigid moral and social ethic of ‘Auld Licht’ Calvinism. Early accounts described him as 'a pious child of modest, reserved nature'.

== Education ==
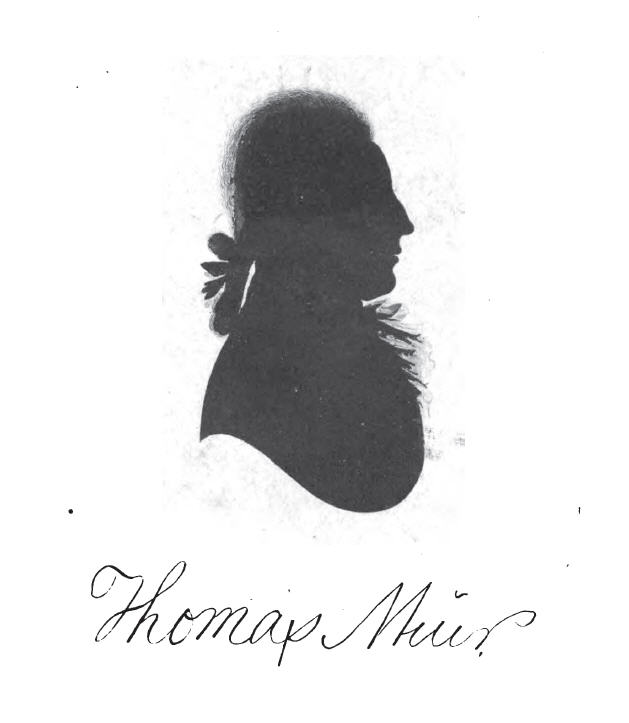
Thomas Muir circa 1793

Muir's education began at the age of five when his father hired William Barclay, a local schoolmaster, as a private tutor. In 1775, at the early age of 10, he was admitted to the "gowned classes" of Glasgow University. After five sessions he matriculated (1777) and took up divinity: like his parents he supported the Auld Licht or popular party in Kirk politics.

== Graduation ==
In 1782, at the age of 17, Muir graduated with an M.A. Influenced by the teachings of John Millar, he abandoned his studies for the Church. At the beginning of the 1783–4 term he was accepted as a student in Millar's classes on Law and Government. His target was Scottish political conservatism in the form of the Faculty of Advocates and he recruited young Whig advocates imbued with a due reverence for the law. Muir joined students' clubs and societies in which the major topics of the day (American Independence, Patronage, and Burgh Reform) were debated.

== Expelled from university ==
In May 1784, a dispute occurred between Professor John Anderson and other members of the Faculty, including Principal William Leechman and Professors Richardson and Taylor. Senior students issued a pamphlet A Statement of Fact against Leechman and the Faculty. After Anderson had departed for London, disciplinary proceedings were launched. Muir, McIndoe, Humphries and ten others were named as ringleaders; a ban was enforced on their attendance at lectures awaiting the result of hearings. Muir and his fellow students requested legal representation, but this request was rejected. Muir gave notice of his voluntary self-expulsion from the university.

At the beginning of the new academic year, Muir, with the assistance of Millar, obtained a place at Edinburgh University under the Whig Professor of Law, John Wylde. Here he completed his studies and having passed his Bar examinations was admitted to the Faculty of Advocates in 1787 at the age of 22.

== Tribune of the people ==
An Elder of the Church of Scotland for his home parish of Cadder, Muir became embroiled at the beginning of 1790 in a dispute with the local landlords led by James Dunlop of Garnkirk, a rich owner. Muir acting on behalf of the elders challenged the attempt of the landlords or heritors to pack the selection committee for a new minister with "Parchment Barons". Upon the case being referred to the Synod at Glasgow, Muir was appointed as Counsel for the congregation and fought a protracted case on their behalf all the way to the General Assembly. In the event the case of the landlords was thrown out, and Muir and his party emerged victorious.

Muir acquired a reputation as a man of principle. His outspoken conviction that many existing laws were biased against the poor, won him the respect of younger advocates who nicknamed him "the Chancellor". His views on law reform were, however, unacceptable to members of the High Court: Lord Braxfield and Robert Dundas.

== Revolution in France ==
The French Revolution of 1789 revived the hopes of all members of the Whig party in Scotland and England, in their campaign for burgh and county reform. Foxite Whigs in Parliament and the Lords inaugurated in April 1792 the London Association of the Friends of the People. Led by the Scots Lords Lauderdale and Buchan, this society enjoyed widespread initial support from leading Whigs throughout Britain.

Since 1789, many clubs and societies had sprung up in the principal towns and villages of Scotland in support of the Revolution and its principles. In June 1792, the members of these societies and, in particular, those at Glasgow, Edinburgh, Dundee and Perth, began a regular correspondence with the object of forming a Scottish counterpart to the London Association. By the end of June 1792, a plan of organisation, principally drawn up by Muir and William Skirving, a Fife farmer, was set in motion. In distinct contrast to the London Association, which was deliberately exclusive, Muir and his associates, taking into consideration the vital educational differential between the working people of Scotland and England, opted for a nationwide association of reform clubs unlimited to any social class. After some initial difficulties due to the entrenched opposition of Henry Erskine, the Dean of the Faculty and leading Scottish Whig, the Scottish Association of the Friends of the People was formed at Edinburgh on 26 July 1792. Supported by two new publications, the Edinburgh Gazeteer and the Caledonian Chronicle, plus James Tytler's Historical Register, the new movement rapidly expanded.

Muir travelled to meet with the leaders of the Friends of the People in London. Sharing their concern that the execution of Louis XVI would be a disaster for the reform movements in the British Isles, Muir agreed to go to France and join Tom Paine in his attempts to persuade the leaders of the revolution to spare the life of the King. Muir had talks with the Girondist leaders, but their influence was waning.

== Edinburgh Convention and United Irish address ==
Muir returned to Scotland on 23 August 1792. At the beginning of October he helped form Glasgow Society of Friends of the People and undertook a propaganda tour of Stirlingshire, Dunbartonshire, and Renfrewshire from which emerged new societies in Kirkintilloch, Birdston, Lennoxtown, Campsie and Paisley. On 21 November, Muir, having been elected vice-president of the movement at the Edinburgh monthly meeting, called for a General Convention of the popular reform societies in Great Britain to be held there in December.

On 8 December, as the first of the delegates were arriving in the capital, an Address of Fraternity from the United Irishmen arrived at Muir's lodgings in Carrubers Close. Drawn up by William Drennan, its appeal to the republican and independent spirit of the Scottish people were entirely to Muir's satisfaction. However, he appears to have unwisely circulated a copy of it among the delegates prior to the first sitting of the convention. Although "there was much in the address that was attractive to the delegates, many objected to the 'intemperate and dangerous nationalistic language".

As Muir rose in the first session Muir to present the Address, he was vigorously opposed by a powerful unionist section among the delegates led by Col. William Dalrymple, Lord Daer and Richard Fowler. The Address contained "Treason or Misprison of Treason against the Union with England". Although the Address 'in its original form' was ultimately rejected, Muir was able to read it out and to declare: "We do not, we cannot, consider ourselves as mowed and melted down into another country. Have we not distinct Courts, Judges, Juries, Laws, etc.?".

== Charged, convicted and transported for sedition ==
Muir spent the days following the Convention preparing a defence brief for James Tytler, arrested on a charge of sedition the previous month. Robert Dundas the Lord Advocate initiated an investigation of Muir's movements during the previous three months. Muir, on his way to Edinburgh on the morning of 2 January 1793 to attend Tytler's trial, was himself arrested on a charge of sedition and brought under guard to Edinburgh. After interrogation before the Sheriff and refusing to answer any questions, Muir was released on bail.

On 8 January Muir set out for London, to tell the Reformers there of the plight of the Scottish Association. The trial of the French King had changed attitudes. Both Charles Gray and Lord Lauderdale were now considering giving up the campaign for Parliamentary reform. Muir went to France, hoping vainly to persuade the French leaders to spare the life of the King. He met personalities of the National Convention including Condorcet, Brissot, Mirabeau and Madame Roland. While in Paris he also met Thomas Paine and Dr William Maxwell of Kirkconnel, the future doctor and associate of Robert Burns.

With the outbreak of war with France the anti-reform party in Scotland became increasingly militant, and Dundas advanced the date of Muir's trial from April to 11 February. Learning this, Muir drafted an open letter stating his intention to return as soon as passport difficulties would admit. Dundas set in motion legal steps to ensure Muir's outlawry for non-appearance on 25 February 1793, when Lord Braxfield pronounced him a fugitive from justice.

On 6 March 1793, Henry Erskine convened a meeting of the Faculty of Advocates at which Muir, with no one to speak in his defence, was unanimously expelled and his name struck from the register. At the end of June Muir obtained a passage from Havre de Grace in an American ship, The Hope of Boston.

Disembarking at Belfast, he made his way south to Dublin where he was feted by William Drennan and other leading United Irishmen, and taking Drennan's membership test was inducted into their society. Urged on by the secretary of the society, Archibald Hamilton Rowan, Muir decided to ignore his father's advice to remain in exile, and to return to Scotland to face down his accusers. He travelled back via Belfast where he was hosted by the publisher of the United Irish paper, the Northern Star, Samuel Neilson.

Landing in Portpatrick on 24 August 1793, he was immediately arrested. Brought under guard to Edinburgh and incarcerated in the Tolbooth prison, on 30 and 31 August he was brought before Braxfield, to answer charges "seditious speeches, circulating seditious publications such as Rights of Man, and reading a seditious document in public, viz. the United Irishmen's address". The judge seized on Muir's connection to the "ferocious" Mr. Rowan (Rowan had challenged Robert Dundas, the Lord Advocate of Scotland, to a duel) and on the United Irishmen papers found in his possession.

Muir was sentenced to 14 years transportation. The reform movement then stiffened their resistance to Government coercion. Muir was removed to an armed cutter, the Royal George, at Leith Roads. There he was soon joined by Thomas Fyshe Palmer, who had received a sentence of 7 years transportation in similar circumstances at Perth. Skirving resolved to convene a new Convention, better organised and more representative than its predecessors. Dundas reacted by ordering the immediate removal of Muir and Palmer to the Hulks at Woolwich, ahead of their departure for Botany Bay.

== Third Convention ==
The Third Convention of the Friends of the People and its successor the 'British Convention' were, like their predecessors, largely dominated by the delegates of the Edinburgh Societies. Moreover, by means of arrests and desertions, the Scottish movement had been deprived of most of its articulate leadership. Into this vacuum stepped three English delegates: Maurice Margarot, a merchant with a university education, Joseph Gerrald, friend and correspondent of William Godwin and an orator of flawless eloquence, and Matthew Campbell Browne, an actor turned reformer. After the early departure of Lord Daer, who was already suffering from the tuberculosis which led to his death the following year, these three men came to dominate the convention and its proceedings.

Only they and Muir realised the true nature of the extraordinary organisational differences existing between the reform movements in England and Scotland. Where the English societies remained psychologically and geographically divided, the Scots had an unprecedented degree of national unity backed by the general sympathy of the common people. Finding themselves almost by accident at the head of such an organisation, they threw all discretion to the winds. Urged on by Campbell Browne's wild histrionics, the movement's covert aims now became an open secret. Aping the Convention at Paris, the terms Citizen President, Secretary General, etc. were now introduced into its published reports, while the convention was rechristened the 'British Convention'.

What Muir thought of this reckless exposure to destruction of the organisation which he and William Skirving had so carefully nurtured is revealed by his description of it in 1797 as 'a miserable plaything of the English Government'. Ultimately it was a motion of Charles Sinclair, delegate from the Society for Constitutional Information (London), which gave Dundas his much sought-for excuse to disperse the convention.

Commenting upon the Convention Bill recently passed in Ireland as a means of suppressing public assemblies, Sinclair moved that a secret committee of four, together with the Secretary, be invested with the power to fix the meeting of a Convention of Emergency. This convention would, if necessary, declare itself permanent and resist attempts to disperse it. When the diligent spy, 'J.B.', duly delivered his report of this discussion, the authorities moved swiftly. Early on the morning of 5 December arrest warrants were issued and served by armed bailiffs upon Skirving, Margarot, Gerrald, Sinclair and Matthew Campbell Browne. In the trials which followed, Skirving, Margarot and Gerrald were each respectively given sentences of 14 years transportation. While these events were occurring, Muir and Palmer were being held in the prison hulks by night and being forced to labour in a chain gang on the banks of the Thames by day. An attempt to ship them out to Botany Bay in the convict transport Ye Canada had failed, when in true 'coffin-ship' tradition, her timbers were found to be rotten. After spending some time in Newgate Jail where they were joined by the newly convicted associates, Palmer, Skirving and Margarot, they were removed by coach to Portsmouth and placed aboard a new transport Surprize. In spite of belated and somewhat reluctant attempts on behalf of the Whigs in Parliament and the Lords to obtain a pardon for the radicals, they were abruptly shipped out for Botany Bay on the morning of 24 May.

== Journey and arrival in Australia ==
On the first of May 1794, the Surprise, convict transport, sailed from Spithead (St. Helen's) for Sydney with Muir, Palmer, Skirving, and Margarot on board. The French Admiralty, by order of the Comite du Salut Public, sent out frigates to attempt their rescue; but the Surprise sailed with a strong convoy of East Indiamen and some of His Majesty's ships, and it does not appear they ever sighted the French frigates. The Surprise reached Sydney on 25 October 1794.

During the long voyage out to Australia an attempt was made (with or without official connivance) to discredit Muir, Skirving and Palmer by implicating them in an alleged mutiny led by the first mate. This affair, however, was so badly bungled that, in spite of having to endure much harsh and brutal treatment at the hands of the captain, the reformers had little difficulty in refuting the evidence against them upon arrival at Port Jackson.

== Confinement at Sydney Cove ==
Muir's term of confinement at the penal colony appears to have been fairly uneventful. As political prisoners, and men of talent and education, Muir and his associates were accorded far greater freedom of movement than ordinary convicts. Prior to their departure from Portsmouth, each had received a considerable sum of money raised as a subscription on their behalf among the wealthy London Whigs. By this means they were able to sustain themselves without recourse to the official colonial stores, and thereby keep free of the compulsory manual labour normally demanded from all dependents.

In November, Judge Advocate Collins records that:

The Lieutenant-Governor having set apart for each of the gentlemen who came out from Scotland in the Surprise a brick hut, in a row on the east side of the cove, they took possession of their new habitations, and soon declared that they found sufficient reason for thinking "the bleak and desolate shores of New Holland " not quite so terrible as in England they had been led to expect.

By December all four had spent the bulk of their remaining cash in purchasing plots of land. Skirving and Muir both seem to have acquired the services of some time-served convicts as servants. Palmer purchased 100 acres (40 hectares) of land for £84, and was soon waxing eloquent about his new occupation as a farmer. Unlike his companions, or indeed his father, Muir had little or no taste for farming and with an eye to ultimate escape from the settlement, he purchased a small hut and several acres of land on the opposite side of the bay. Muir's farm was located in the area that is now Jeffrey Street in Kirribilli.

By this means he was able to remove himself from the direct observation of the Governor and his soldiers and at the same time was provided with a legitimate excuse for keeping a small boat.

Early in 1796 with the assistance of Pierre François Péron, a French sailor, he succeeded in arranging his escape from the settlement on board the American maritime fur trade ship Otter, of Boston.

Some accounts state that Muir's rescue or flight was not the first of such escapes may be judged from a remark of William Robert Broughton, Royal Navy, who sailed from Port Jackson in HMS Providence, 13 Oct 1795, "We abstained from following the example of other ships that have touched at this colony, by not taking away any of the convicts, a practice very general in merchant ships gay".

The captain of Otter, Ebenezer Dorr, had, however, made it a precondition of his part in the escape plan that Muir and any who chose to go with him should effect their own escape from the harbour at Port Jackson, as this was carefully guarded by a blockading frigate. Muir swiftly contacted his fellow prisoners. However, in the event, none but himself was able to go. Skirving who had suffered from a recent bout of yellow fever was too weak, and would shortly be dead. Gerrald who had recently arrived in the settlement was in the final stages of acute tuberculosis and the Revd Palmer, who was nursing him, refused to leave his charge. Only Margarot might have availed himself of Muir's plan; however he was absent at a farm deep in the hills at Parramatta, and in any case he had been sent to Coventry (i.e. exiled) by his former colleagues because of his part in supporting the mutiny allegations.

== Escape to America ==
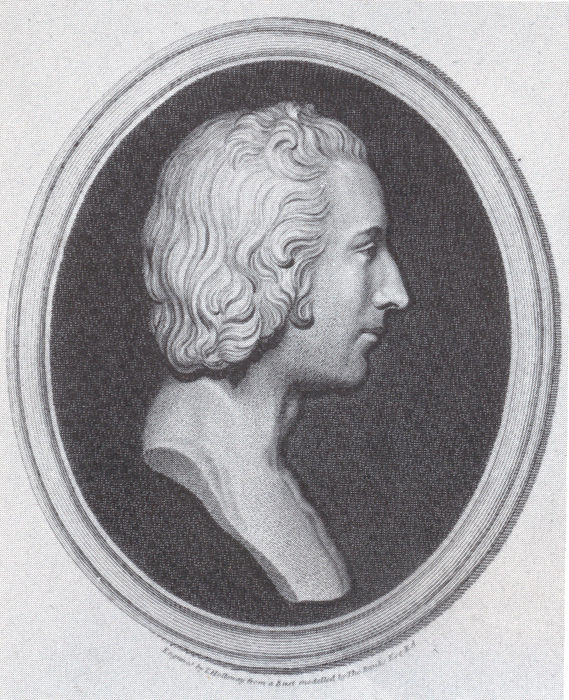
Thomas Muir

On the evening of 17 February 1796, Muir, together with two convict servants, loaded up his small boat with one day's provisions and stealthily rowed their way out of the harbour. Hugging the shore, they successfully eluded detection by the watch on the frigate, and navigated their way towards their prearranged point of rendezvous. At about 12 am on the following day, wet and exhausted, they were hauled aboard Otter. Muir, who had been unable to bring with him any of his personal property, left behind a note giving his books and papers to Palmer, with whom he also left a letter for the Governor thanking him for his tolerance and stating his intention of practising law at the American Bar. After a highly adventurous voyage across the as yet largely uncharted Pacific Ocean to Vancouver Island, Otter finally dropped anchor in Nootka Sound on 22 June 1796.

The chronicles of Pierre François Péron describe Muir's escape and the voyage across the Pacific and as far as Monterey, California.

In conversation with the Portuguese José Tovar, the piloto (master) of the Sutil, a Spanish vessel at anchor in the bay, Muir learned to his dismay of the presence in neighbouring waters of HMS Providence, a Royal Navy sloop-of-war under Commander William Robert Broughton. Providence had visited Port Jackson shortly before Muir's escape and, since he had almost certainly become acquainted with Broughton or members of his crew, his life was now in danger, as to be captured while under a sentence of transportation meant immediate execution. Once again, Muir's luck saved him. While a student at Glasgow, he had acquired a fluent command of Spanish and he was now able to persuade Tovar to break his regulations regarding the admission of foreigners into Spanish territory. Changing vessels he sailed with Tovar down the coast of California to the port of Monterey, California. On arrival at this important Spanish outpost, Muir was introduced to the Governor, Don Diego Borica, who was favourably impressed by his character and intelligence, and allocated him accommodation along with his own family in the Presidio.

However, when Borica in due course submitted a report on Muir to his superior, the Viceroy at Mexico City, matters took a turn for the worse. Ignoring Muir's request to pass through Spanish territory to the United States, the Viceroy, instead, ordered the severe disciplining of Tovar for violating his orders. Muir's use of Washington's name and his claims of friendship with many of the leading personalities of the French Revolution, had rendered him highly suspicious to the Spanish authorities. Accordingly, Borica was directed to have Muir conducted with all haste to the capital 'without open sign of his being under arrest'. Accompanied by two officers detached from the Governor's staff, Muir, after a gruelling and often dangerous trek across the mountains, reached Mexico City on 12 October. For some days he was held in detention and closely questioned as to his purpose in entering California. It is evident, however, that his explanations were disbelieved by the sceptical Viceroy, who resolved to ship him out to Spain as a suspected spy. Under heavy guard, Muir was dispatched on the road for the port of Vera Cruz where he arrived on 22 October. In spite of his demands to be put on board an American ship, he was shipped out to Havana, Cuba to await the departure of a convoy for Spain.

== Return to Europe ==
For some time, Muir appears to have regained his liberty in Havana, for he spoke to several American merchants explaining his plight. He also appears to have attempted an escape, only to be recaptured and imprisoned for three months in the dungeons of the La Principia Fortress. However Muir was nothing if not resourceful and it was while he was in La Principia that he succeeded by some means in contacting Victor Hugues, the French Agent for the Windward Islands. On learning of Muir's situation Hughes wrote to the Directory in France, thus providing them with the first concrete news of Muir's escape and survival. He also wrote an indignant letter to the governor of Cuba protesting bitterly at Muir's harsh treatment and demanding his release. However, by the time this letter arrived in Havana, Muir had already sailed for Spain.

Whatever misgivings or fears Muir may have had for his safety at the hands of his Spanish jailers, one danger had not occurred to him: that of confrontation with the Royal Navy. On the morning of 26 April 1797, as Muir's ship Ninfa approached the entrance to Cádiz Harbour, she was confronted by the HMS Irresistible and HMS Emerald who for some weeks had been blockading the port. Seeing at once that a conflict was inevitable, Muir approached Ninfa's captain and asked to be put ashore as he was unwilling to bear arms against a ship which almost certainly contained some of his fellow countrymen. The captain, however, faced with the likely destruction of his vessel, had no time to consider the feelings of a prisoner. Turning about, Ninfa and a fellow frigate Santa Elena headed up the coast, hotly pursued by Irresistible and Emerald. After a chase of some three hours duration, Ninfa and Santa Elena were engaged in battle opposite Conil de la Frontera. In the action which followed, Ninfa was seriously damaged, while Santa Elena, reputedly a rich bullion ship, was deliberately wrecked by her crew. During the last few moments of the engagement, Muir received a glancing blow to the face from a piece of shrapnel which smashed his left cheek bone and seriously injured both his eyes. One of the crew under interrogation appears to have revealed the fact of Muir's presence on board, and a careful search was made for his body. However, the Spanish captain insisted that Muir was among the dead, and in the event, he was so badly disfigured that his would-be captors failed to identify him, and he was sent ashore with the wounded. Now began a long and painful recovery while the French and Spanish authorities, from consular to ambassadorial and ultimately at ministerial level, indulged in a bitter diplomatic wrangle over Muir's release.

== Last days in France ==
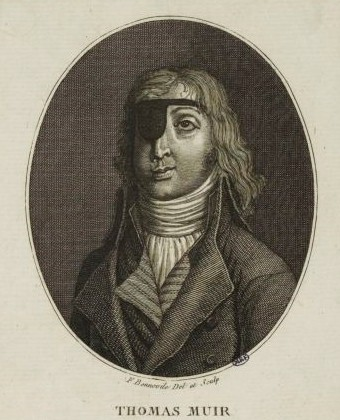
Thomas Muir with a large black patch over his right eye, engraved by François Bonneville (Musée de la Révolution française)

Finally on 16 September 1797, the Spanish government relented and decreed Muir's release and perpetual banishment from Spanish territories. Still weak and emaciated from his sufferings, Muir made his way to France by way of Madrid and San Sebastian, aided and assisted by a young officer from the French Consulate at Cádiz. In early November 1797, he arrived exhausted at Bordeaux, where he was hailed publicly as a 'Hero of the French Republic' and a 'Martyr of Liberty'. Feted by the civic authorities and literary societies, his last portrait, commissioned for display in public buildings, shows him with a large black patch over his left eye. The loss of his left cheekbone had caused that side of his face to droop, revealing the teeth in a perpetual grimace. Muir, weak and half blind, slowly made his way north to Paris where he arrived on 4 February 1798.

Muir's arrival in the capital was heralded by a great outburst of popular adulation. David, the great French artist and propagandist was officially appointed to welcome him to the city, in a front page eulogy in the Government journal Le Moniteur. From the very outset, however, Muir made it abundantly clear to his benefactors that flattered though he was by their attentions towards him, their intentions on behalf of his suffering countrymen were now to be his chief concern. He associated with Thomas Paine and James Napper Tandy of the United Irishmen, from whom he learned the exciting news of the near-insurrection in Scotland over the Militia Act. During 1798 he submitted many letters and memoranda to the Directory urging them to intervene militarily on behalf of the people and thus aid them in establishing a Scottish Republic.

Muir's chief confidant and informant during 1798 was Dr Robert Watson of Elgin, emissary to France on behalf of the United Englishmen. From him he learned for the first time details of the strength and extent of the United Scotsmen, the new revolutionary association which had replaced the Friends of the People. From Watson he also learned of the impending arrival in Paris of James Kennedy of Paisley and Angus Cameron of Blair Atholl as delegates of the new movement. Since Muir was by this time the principal intermediary between the Directory and the various republican refugees in Paris he was aware that his movements were under scrutiny by Pitt's agents. Accordingly, in his last known communication with the Directory in October 1798, he requested permission to leave Paris for somewhere less conspicuous, where his crucial negotiations with the Scots emissaries could be conducted in safety.

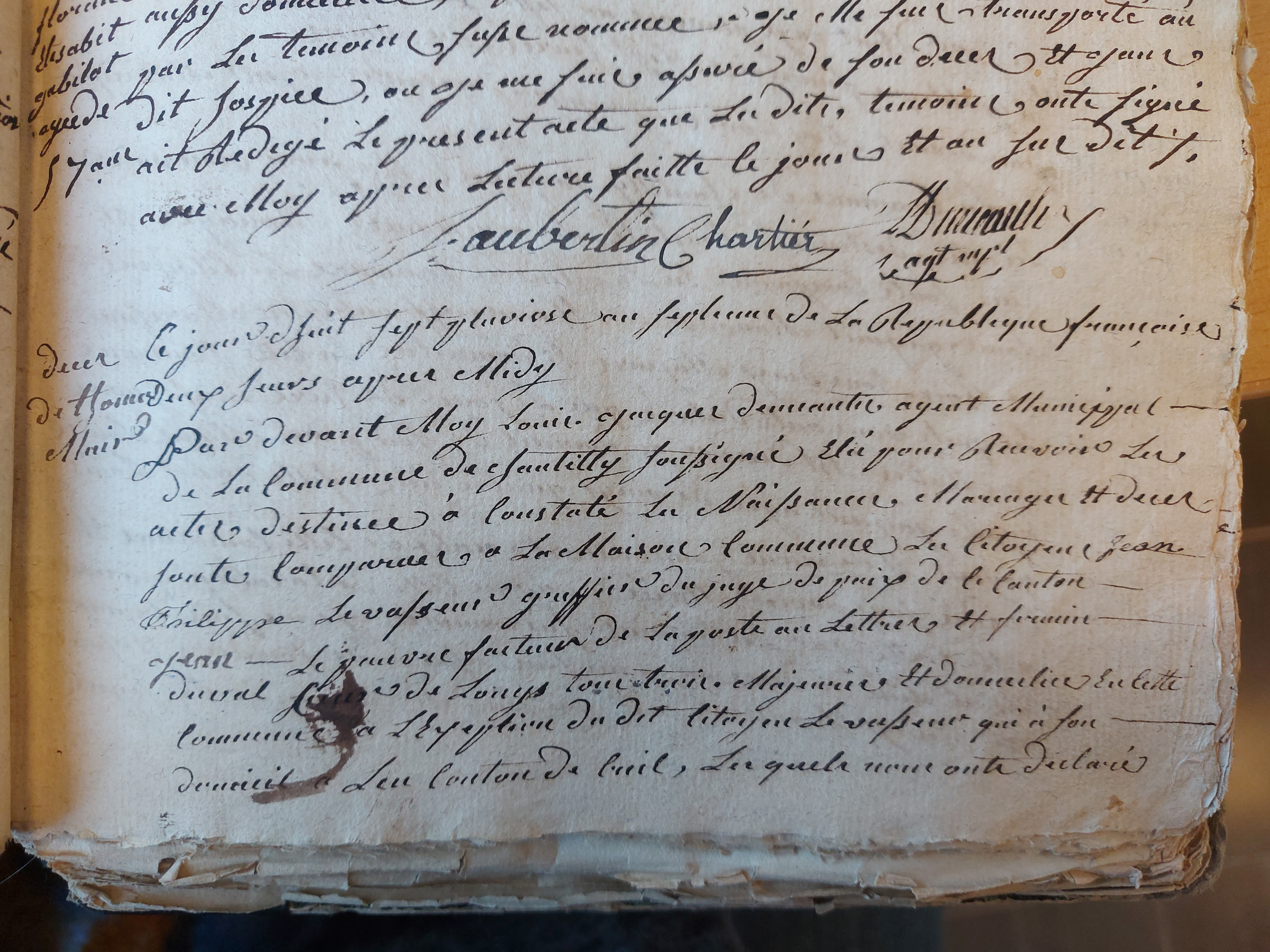
First page of the death record of Thomas Muir

Thus, it was that sometime in the middle of November 1798, Muir moved incognito to the little Île-de-France village of Chantilly to await the arrival of his Scots compatriots. The only surviving documentation of his death is the record in the Chantilly town register, pictured on the right. The record, in French, is dated 7 pluviôse VII, the 26th of January 1799 in the Gregorian calendar. It states that Muir was found dead at half past six on the morning of the previous day, the 25th of January, by a boy of around twelve years old named Labussière. Muir's name was known only by word of mouth and because a man named as Citoyen Lepauve brought him personally addressed newspapers.

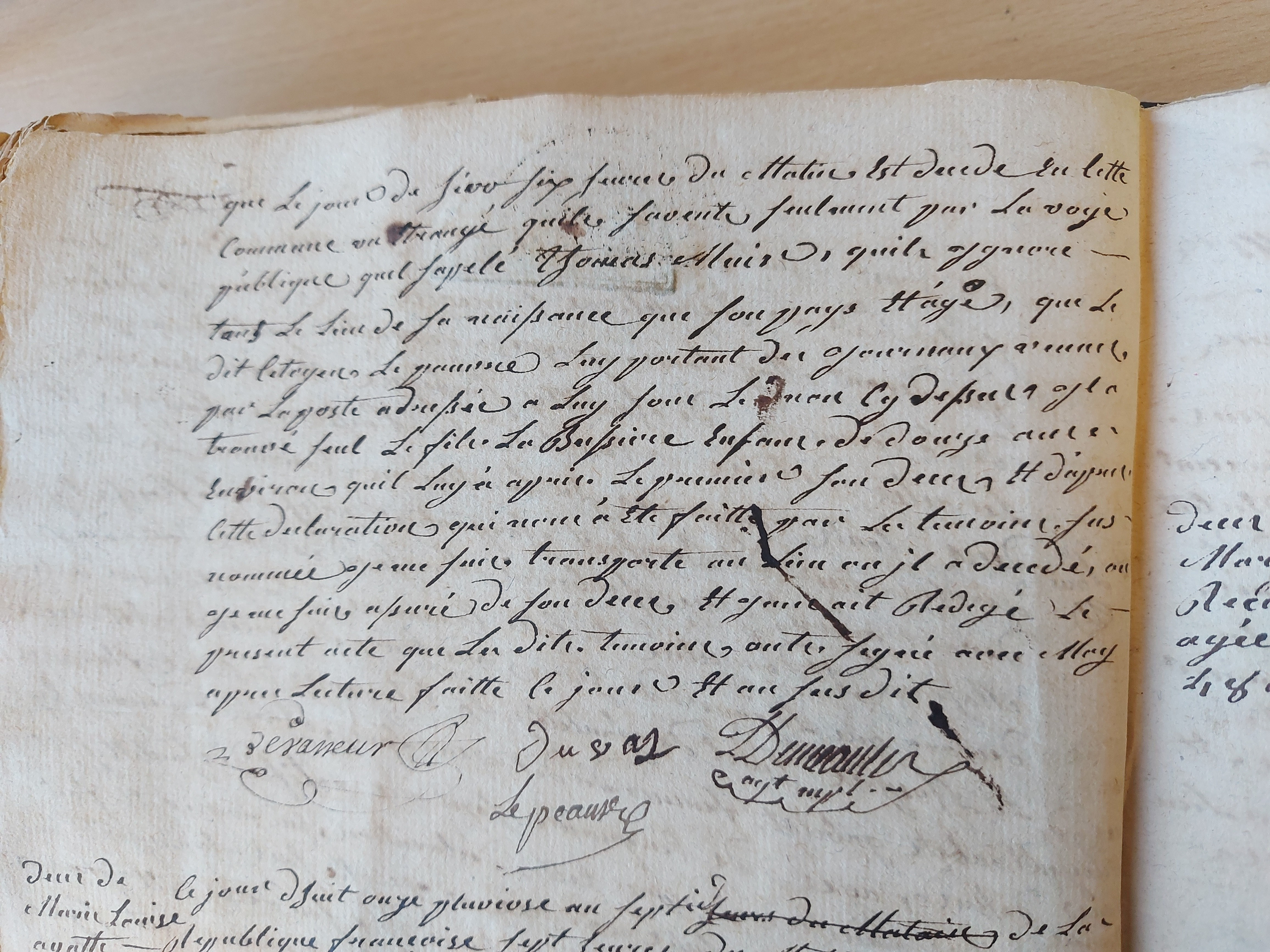
Second page of the death record of Thomas Muir

When several days later the news of Muir's passing finally reached Paris, a brief obituary notice was inserted in Le Moniteur Universel to the effect that he had died from a recurrence of his old wounds. Shortly before his death, he said:

We have achieved a great duty in these critical times. After the destruction of so many years, we have been the first to revive the spirit of our country and give it a National Existence.

== Political Martyrs ==
Thomas Muir was the most important of the group of two Scotsmen and three Englishmen commemorated at the Political Martyrs' Monument, the others being Thomas Fyshe Palmer, William Skirving, Maurice Margarot. and Joseph Gerrald). In 1793, the men were also sentenced to transportation to Australia for sedition and for writing and publishing pamphlets on parliamentary reform.

== Honours ==
After the Reform Act of 1832, Charles Tennant, chemical manufacturer in Glasgow, started the campaign to mark the work of Thomas Muir and his fellow reformers. After years of searching for a site to celebrate them, two large obelisks were funded by public subscription raised by the radical MP Joseph Hume and others. The first was in Edinburgh and the second in Nunhead Cemetery in South East London, unveiled in 1851.

The obelisk in the Old Calton Cemetery in Edinburgh was designed in 1844 by architect Thomas Hamilton (1784–1858) and stands 90 feet (27 m) high.

Scottish Political Martyrs' Monument, Old Calton Burial Ground, Edinburgh

The monument speaks for itself:

To The Memory of Thomas Muir, Thomas Fyshe Palmer, William Skirving, Maurice Margarot and Joseph Gerrald. Erected by the Friends of Parliamentary Reform in England and Scotland, 1844.

It includes the following two quotations, the first by Muir and the second by Skirving:

I have devoted myself to the cause of The People. It is a good cause – it shall ultimately prevail – it shall finally triumph.

And:

I know that what has been done these two days will be Re-Judged.

The Nunhead obelisk was erected in 1837 and stands 40 feet (12 m) high.

A Cairn and Martyrs Gate were erected at Huntershill Village by John S. L. Watson of Huntershill and partly funded by the East Dunbartonshire Council.

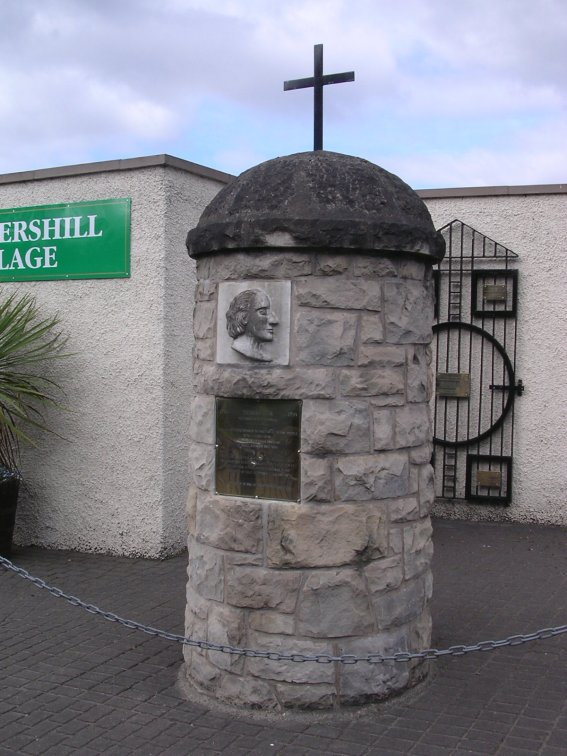
Thomas Muir Cairn at Huntershill Village

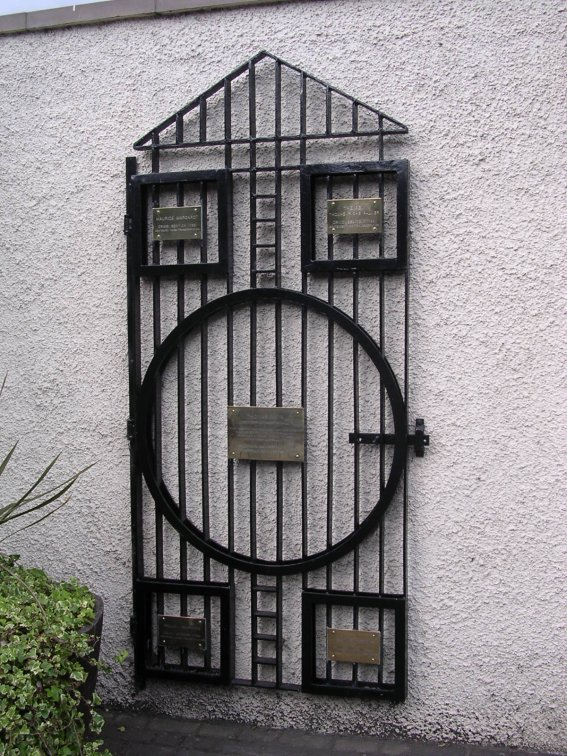
Scottish Political Martyrs Gate at Huntershill Village

John Watson and Thomas Muir Coffee Shop commissioned Bishopbriggs local artist John Spinelli to paint a series of watercolours, depicting Thomas Muir's dramatic escape from Botany Bay and his adventures that led him to France. They're displayed throughout the coffee shop.

There is a permanent exhibition to Thomas Muir at Bishopbriggs library, which includes a specially commissioned bust of Thomas Muir by the celebrated Scottish artist Alexander Stoddart. Thomas Muir Street in Greenock is named after him. A school in Bishopbriggs, the Thomas Muir High School which opened in 1981, was named after him. It was merged with another school in 2003 to form Bishopbriggs Academy.

A mural of Muir was painted by graffiti artist ‘Rogue One’ in 2022 in the Trongate area of Glasgow.

Robert Burns wrote Scots Wha Hae on the day Muir's trial started. The letter he wrote to George Hamilton (about 30 August 1793) with the first draft made it clear who he had in mind; Wallace was an allegory for the real hero*...

So may God defend the cause of TRUTH and LIBERTY, as he did that day! – Amen!
P.S. I shewed the air to Urbani, who was highly please with it, & begged me to make soft verses for it; but I had no idea of giving myself any trouble on the subject, till the accidental recollection of that same struggle for Freedom, associated with the glowing idea's of some other struggles of the same nature, not quite so ancient*, roused my rhyming Mania. –Clarke's set of the tune, with his bass, you will find in the Museum; though I am afraid that the air is not what will entitle it to a place in your elegant selection. – However, I am so pleased with my verses, or more properly, the subject of my verses, that although Johnson has already given the tune a place, yet it shall appear again, set to this song, in his next & last Volume.-

RB

Despite his historical significance, Muir has been the subject of relatively few folk songs. One example is Thomas Muir of Huntershill, written by the Scottish folk singer Adam McNaughtan and later recorded by Dick Gaughan.

== See also ==
- List of convicts transported to Australia
- Jeffrey Street or Jeffreys Street, Kirribilli

== Sources ==
- Alger, John Goldworth (1894). "Muir, Thomas" . In Lee, Sidney (ed.). Dictionary of National Biography. Vol. 39. London: Smith, Elder & Co.
- Donnelly, Michael (1975) Thomas Muir of Huntershill 1765–1799 This article is reproduced by kind permission of Michael Donnelly
- Clune, Frank The Scottish Martyrs (1969) Angus & Robertson SBN 207-95254-x
- Earnshaw, John Thomas Muir Scottish Martyr (1959) The Stone Copying Company NSW
- Bewley, Christina Muir of Huntershill (1981) Oxford University Press ISBN 0-19-211768-8
- MacKenzie, Peter The Life of Thomas Muir, Esquire, Advocate (1831) Glasgow
- Robertson, James (Printer) Account of the Trial of Thomas Muir Esq., Younger of Huntershill 1793 for Sedition (1793)
- Campbell, Samuel (Printer) An Account of the Trial of Thomas Muir, of Huntershill, Before the High Court of Judiciary at Edinburgh, on the 30th & 31st days of August 1793, for Sedition (1794)
- Peron, P.F., Memoires du Capitaine Peron sur ses Voyages (1824) Paris
- Serle, Percival (1949). "Muir, Thomas". Dictionary of Australian Biography. Sydney: Angus & Robertson.
- Prentis, Malcolm. "Great Australian Presbyterians: The Game". Uniting Church in Australia. Archived from the original on 11 December 2006.
