= SMS Otter =

Two ships of the German Imperial Navy named SMS Otter:

- SMS Otter (1877), a gunboat launched in 1877
- SMS Otter (1909), a river gunboat launched in 1909 and stationed in China
