= Otter (1807 ship) =

History

United States
- Builder: America
- Launched: 1799
- Fate: Sold c.1807

United Kingdom
- Name: Otter
- Namesake: Otter
- Owner: 1807:Charles, Samuel & George Enderby; 1811:Francis
- Acquired: c.1807
- Fate: Captured November 1813

General characteristics
- Tons burthen: 169, or 170 (bm)
- Armament: 2 × 6-pounder guns

Otter was launched in America in 1799. She appeared in the Register of Shipping in 1809, after she had already made the first of three voyages as a whaler. She then started trading with the Mediterranean where the French captured her in 1813.

== Career ==
Otter appeared in the Register of Shipping for 1809 with T. Hopper, master, Enderby, owner, and trade London–Southern Fishery.

Whaling voyage #1 (1807–1808?): Captain Thomas Hopper sailed from London in 1807, bound for the Brazil Banks. In February 1808 Otter was on the Brazil Banks.

Whaling voyage #2 (1808–1809?): Captain Hopper sailed from England on 10 June 1808, bound for the Brazil Banks. Otter had left Gravesend on 28 May. She was in company with another Enderby whaler, the snow Swan, James Lindsay, master. Lloyd's List reported on 26 July 1808 that Otter, Hopper, master, and Swan, Lindsay, master, had been at Madeira on 27 June on their way to the South Seas.

Swan rediscovered Bouvet Island on 4 October, with Otter arriving some three days later. They recorded the island's position but were unable to land because of the ice.

On 16 March 1809 Otter, Hopper, master, was at Port Jackson, New South Wales, with a cargo of sperm oil. She had come from the "Fishery" and she returned to the Fishery on 2 April 1809.

Whaling voyage #3 (1809–1811): Captain Jobling sailed from England in 1809, bound for the waters off New Zealand. Otter returned on 25 January 1811.

On Otter's return from her third whaling voyage Enderbys sold her. She entered Lloyd's Register in 1812 with Francis, master and owner, and trade London–Smyrna.

== Fate ==
The French privateer Babiole captured Otter, Francis, master, on 26 November 1813 as Otter was sailing back to London from Smyrna. Otter arrived at Toulon on 5 December.

== Origins ==
Some sources suggest that Otter was an American vessel called Little William, supposedly taken in prize in 1807 by Betsy (or Betsey). This appears to be a misreading of several sources. The Royal Navy did detain an American vessel named Little William and send her into Portsmouth. Little William was suspected of having planned to run the British blockade of the rivers Elbe, Weser, and Ems. The High Court of Admiralty condemned Little William, Brown, master, on 23 November 1807. However, Brown, and William Lyman, the American consul general in London, appealed the verdict. On 25 January 1810 the appeals court returned her to her owners, ruling that her master had perhaps sailed a little imprudently, but was not guilty of positioning his vessel to run the blockade. The court also required Little William's owners to pay the court costs for the original case and the appeal.

The confusion of Little William with Otter may stem from the confluence of two items. The ship arrivals and departures (SAD) data in Lloyd's List for 10 May 1808 shows "Otter, Betsy" arriving at Gravesend on 7 May, from Philadelphia. The line below shows the arrival on the same day of "St. Ann (prize)", from Portsmouth. In addition, the reports of the case in which the appeals judge returned Little William to her owner mentions the case of Betsy, and discusses why that case was not a relevant precedent for the case of Little William.
