= Otter (1795 ship) =

History

United States
- Name: Otter
- Owner: Captain Ebenezer Dorr was owner and captain
- Builder: Amesbury, Massachusetts
- Launched: 1795
- In service: 1795-1798
- Fate: Captured by French and lost in 1798

General characteristics
- Tons burthen: 168 (bm)
- Length: 77 ft (23.5 m)
- Beam: 22 ft 5 in (6.8 m)
- Depth: 11 ft (3.4 m)
- Propulsion: Sail
- Complement: 14-31 men
- Armament: 6 guns
- Notes: Three masts & two decks

Otter was a maritime fur trading vessel. Between 1795 and 1798 it visited the Pacific. It was most famous for the rescue of Thomas Muir, a famous Scottish political exile.

Muir was convicted of sedition before the High Court of Justiciary at Edinburgh in 1793. He was sentenced and transported to the convict settlement at Sydney Cove for the space of fourteen years on 31 August 1793.

Otter, commanded by Capt. Ebenezer Dorr, was fitted out at Boston, and despatched for Sydney. The Boston register of clearances, Treasury Department archives, dates her clearance 20 August 1795. She anchored in Sydney Harbour on 25 January 1796. On 11 February 1796, Muir escaped from the convict settlement on board Otter.

Captain Dorr took Muir and other escaped political prisoners onboard and sailed to the Pacific Northwest Coast. There the Otter cruised for furs in the spring and summer of 1796. Some sources say that the ship struck a chain of sunken rocks near Nootka Sound, on the west coast of North America, and was wrecked. Every person on board perished except Mr. Muir and two sailors. This is unlikely. Other reliable sources state that when Muir parted from Otter at Nootka in June 1796, Otter continued north to Bucareli Bay, on the west of Prince of Wales Island and then sailed into the harbor of Monterey on 29 October 1796, the first United States vessel to enter a Californian port.

The voyage of Otter across the Pacific was famously chronicled by Pierre François Péron.

== Description ==
Little is known of Otter. Some accounts state that she was probably a 168-ton ship, the Master was Daniel Bennett and she was owned by Loring & Curtis. It is most probable that her homeport was Boston.

Spanish accounts state that she carried six cannon and a crew of twenty-six men.

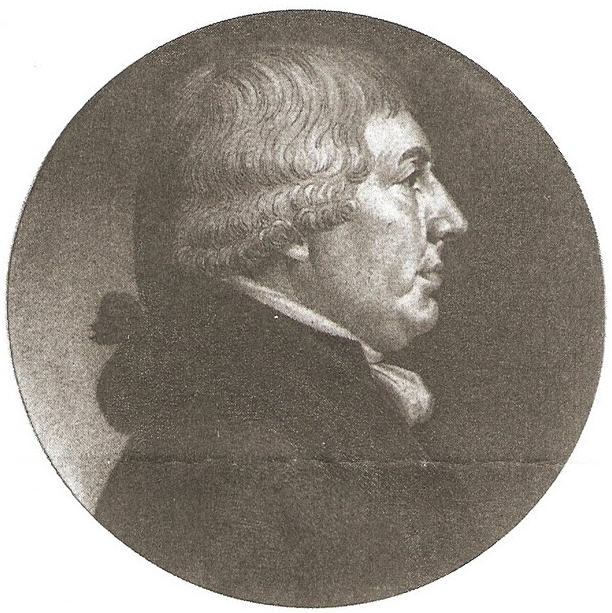
Captain Ebenezer Dorr circa 1800

== Captain Ebenezer Dorr ==
Ebenezer Dorr was born in Suffolk Massachusetts on 30 Dec. 1762. He was the fourth in his family to bear that name. In 1775 his father Ebenezer Dorr (1738-1809), like Paul Revere, rode from Boston to warn residents of Massachusetts about the advancing British army. On 16 Sept 1790 he sailed from Boston aboard the brigantine Hope as supercargo under Captain Joseph Ingraham on a voyage to the Northwest Coast and China for the Old China Trade. The voyage was ultimately a financial failure. Dorr returned to Boston with Hope in the summer of 1793. In 1795 Dorr was given command of Otter on his second voyage to the Pacific.

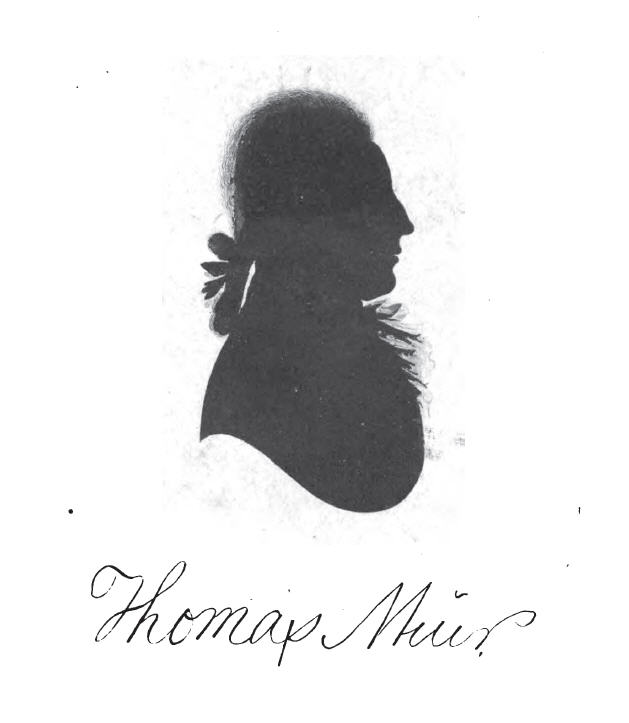
Thomas Muir circa 1793

== The rescue and transportation of Thomas Muir ==
The incident in which Otter rescued Thomas Muir, a famous Scottish political exile, is well documented. Muir was sentenced on 31 August 1793 to be transported for sedition for a term of fourteen years. In the middle of April 1794, he left England on board Surprize, and after a tedious voyage reached Sydney on September 25 of the same year. At this time Sydney was still a very small colony at Sydney Cove with about 1,500 people. Muir stated in letters that he purchased a "small hut and several acres of land". Accounts indicate that the land was located in the immediate vicinity of Jeffrey Street in the modern suburb of Kirribilli. After Muir had been in this penal settlement about two years, a project was formed in America to rescue him from captivity. Some sources credit the American president, George Washington, with the rescue attempt. Other sources discredit this idea. An authoritative paper titled "The Odyssey of Thomas Muir" by Marjorie Masson and J. F. Jameson examines the escape of Muir from the convict settlement at Sydney.

Otter, commanded by Captain Dorr, was fitted out at Boston, and despatched to Sydney, where she anchored on 25 January 1796. Captain Dorr and a few of his crew landed at the very spot where Mr. Muir was located (the vicinity of Jeffrey Street in the modern suburb of Kirribilli), under the pretence that they were proceeding to China and were in want of fresh water. The captain had an audience with Mr Muir, and not a moment was lost. On the morning of 11 February 1796, Muir was safely taken on board Otter, which instantly set sail. Other accounts state that Muir rowed out of the harbour and met Otter outside the Heads. Muir's own account of his escape, as given in subsequent letters preserved in Spanish archives, is that Captain Dorr, coming into Port Jackson in January 1796 agreed to give him a passage to Boston provided he could effect his escape without danger to Dorr. On the evening of February 18, the day before Dorr was to sail, Muir put to sea in a small boat, with two servants, taking nothing with him but the shirt and coat on his back, and that about the middle of the next day they boarded Otter at a considerable distance from land. One account states that as many as 20 convicts escaped from the penal colony in Port Jackson aboard Otter. Three of the convicts were left on Nomuka Island in Haʻapai, Tonga on 15 March 1796.

Otter subsequently landed at Pukapuka on 3 April 1796. Pierre François Péron, first mate on board Otter and chronicler of the voyage, gave the island the name "Isles de la Loutre" (Isles of the Otter) . The following day, Péron and a small party landed and some trading took place near the ship as adzes, mats and other artifacts were exchanged for knives and European goods.

Some accounts state that many months later Otter was wrecked when she struck a chain of sunken rocks near Nootka Sound, on the west coast of North America. These accounts report that every person on board perished except Mr. Muir and two sailors. However other reliable sources state that Otter continued north to Bucareli Bay, on the west of Prince of Wales Island and cruised the Northwest Coast acquiring sea otter pelts. Whether Muir went with her, or remained for a space at Nootka, or was transferred to some other ship. First hand accounts (by Péron) omits to say. Péron makes no further mention of Muir until, on 31 October 1796, he reached Monterey going south, where he states that Muir had preceded him. At the time the Spanish settlement at Nootka Sound, protected by Fort San Miguel, had been abandoned for less than a year, by the terms of the third Nootka Convention. The buildings and gardens remained for years afterwards.

== Entry into the port of Monterey ==
Spanish accounts note that Otter is said to have been the first United States vessel to arrive at Monterey, California, in 1796. Otter was described as a United States man-of-war. She carried six cannon and a crew of twenty-six men.

Entering the port of Monterey, her captain was supplied with wood and water. When ready to sail he asked permission of Governor Borica to land eleven English sailors who had secretly boarded his vessel at Botany Bay, Australia. The Governor refused his consent. It was a violation of Spanish law to land any foreigners. The shrewd Yankee captain, however, that night forced the sailors at the point of a pistol to go ashore. He then speedily put to sea. Borica was very angry. Making the best of the situation, however, he put the men to work as carpenters and blacksmiths.

== Subsequent records ==
Otter is recorded as having subsequently visited Hawaii in 1796. The record states that Otter was on the Boston registry with Ebenezer Dorr, master. It sighted Hawaii on 2 December 1796 and left Kauai on 1 January 1797.

Otter then took the sea otter hides it had gathered and sailed to Canton, where it remained from 13 February to 27 March. It arrived at Portland, Maine, almost a year later, on 27 January 1798.

Upon her return to New England the Otter was sold to new owners. In 1798 the vessel was captured by the French and lost at sea.

Captain Ebenezer Dorr returned to Boston, where he died in 1847.
