= John Frost (republican) =

English radical and republican

John Frost (1750–1842) was an English radical and republican, known as the secretary of the London Corresponding Society.

== Life ==
Born in October 1750, Frost was educated at Winchester College, and became an attorney. In 1782 he was a prominent member of a group meeting at the Thatched House Tavern in London, who advocated constitutional reforms. There his associates included William who corresponded with Frost on parliamentary representation, the Duke of Richmond, Lord Surrey, Lord Mahon, Major John Cartwright, John Horne Tooke, and John Wilkes.

At the beginning of the French Revolution Frost adopted republican principles, and in 1792 sheltered in his house a number of political prisoners. The same year he took a leading part in founding the Corresponding Society, for which he also acted as secretary. The Society began active propaganda for a reform of the parliamentary representation: one of its manifestoes, prepared by Frost and Thomas Hardy showed that 257 representatives of the people, a majority of the existing House of Commons, were returned by a number of voters that was less than 0.1% of the nation.

The Society for Constitutional Information was active at the same time, with both societies having branches in the provinces. The Constitutional Society elected Frost a deputy to the convention of France in 1793, his colleague being Joel Barlow, whose expenses he paid. In this character he was present at the trial of Louis XVI (1792–3), and was denounced in one of Edmund Burke's speeches as the ambassador to his murderers.

On the information of the attorney-general Frost was arrested in February 1793 on a charge of sedition. He was brought to trial in the following May, the charge being that he had uttered words in Percy's coffee-house, Marylebone in favour of equality, and against the king and constitution. Defended by Thomas Erskine, he was found guilty, and was sentenced to six months in Newgate Prison, to stand once in the pillory at Charing Cross, to find sureties, and to be struck off the roll of attorneys. On 19 December 1793, Frost was brought out of Newgate in a state of collapse; but the crowd took the horses out of his carriage and drew him along the streets, shouting. They went to his house in Spring Gardens, where John Thelwall made a speech.

During a debate in the House of Commons in May 1794 Pitt stated that the Corresponding Society had proposed to the Society for Constitutional Information a plan for a convention for all England, to overturn the established system of government. On 28 July 1797 members of the Corresponding Society assembled in a field near St Pancras, London. They were interrupted when magistrates arrested the principal speakers. The Society itself was then suppressed by the government.

Frost was a candidate as Member of Parliament for East Grinstead in 1802, and petitioned against his opponent's return; a committee of the House of Commons found that the petition was frivolous and vexatious. In December 1813 Frost received from the Prince Regent a free pardon; and on 8 February 1815, the Court of King's Bench replaced his name on the roll of attorneys, but held that he was presumably unfit for the employment.

Frost lived to the age of 91, dying at Holly Lodge, near Lymington, Hampshire, on 25 July 1842.

== Notes ==
Attribution

This article incorporates text from a publication now in the public domain: Stephen, Leslie, ed. (1889). "Frost, John (1750-1842)". Dictionary of National Biography. Vol. 20. London: Smith, Elder & Co.
