= The Fairy of the Lake =

The Fairy of the Lake is a play written in 1801 by British writer, John Thelwall, and was first published in his book, Poems Chiefly Written in Retirement. It is a melodrama set around the 5th century and is based on Arthurian legend. Despite being written in the 1800s, it did not premiere until 2009.

== Plot ==
The play consists of three acts.

In Act I, Rowenna, a Saxon sorceress who is married to the King of Britain (Vortigern), plots to overthrow her husband and win Arthur's love. She conjures the Fates and requests information about her passion and Arthur's future. Rowenna is cryptically told by the Fates that "Arthur's hand shall light the flame in which thy sorrows all expire." Rowenna takes this as good news and summons a frost-demon, Incubus, to help her. She is then notified that Arthur and his knights have initiated a coup against Vortigern in retaliation for his treacherous relationship with the Saxons. In a fierce battle, Arthur slays Rowenna's father, Hengist, King of the Saxons. Rowenna learns that Vortigern has taken his daughter, Guenever, after fleeing the battle and plans to molest her. Instead of being distraught by her father's death, Rowenna is instead glad that he died by Arthur's hand and that Arthur's love for Guenever is soon to be tainted by her "rifled beauties." Rowenna sets a plan in motion to win Arthur's heart.

In Act II, the summoned Incubus aids Rowenna by freezing all of Arthur's men. Rowenna takes advantage of Arthur's distraught state and instructs her demons to tie him up after he sets down his enchanted sword. She attempts to charm him, but is thwarted when the Lady of the Lake appears and saves Arthur and his men.

In Act III, Rowenna poisons Vortigern believing that she will fulfil her fate and be free to marry Arthur after her husband's death. However, Arthur storms the castle to rescue Guenever, and in doing so, he scorns the sorceress. Enraged, Rowenna orders the tower where Guenever is held to be set aflame. Guenever and Tristram, one of Arthur's trusted soldiers, are burned to death. A furious Arthur retaliates by burning down the rest of the castle. Rowenna is killed in the blaze, and the castle sinks into the moat, which magically becomes a lake. From its waters, the Lady of the Lake emerges in a chariot pulled by swans. She has rescued Tristram and Guenever. Arthur is reunited with Guenever and crowned as the true and virtuous King of Britain.

== First performance ==
The play's first performance was held in October 2009 by The Dalhousie University Theatre Department and directed by the local Halifax, Nova Scotia theatre company, Zuppa. The production was held in conjunction with a conference on the work of John Thelwall, hosted by the University's English department.

The reason why this premiere was so long delayed the play's once provocative nature. Due to his political beliefs, Thelwall was persecuted and subsequently exiled from England to Wales, where he wrote The Fairy of the Lake. Thelwall was later able to return to England after a taking up a new career as an elocutionist and practitioner of speech therapy.

=== Cast ===
- Rowena, Queen of Britain; a sorceress — Allison Basha
- Edelthred and Agga, her attendants — Dana Thompson and Richelle Khan
- Alwin, a Saxon Chief — Tyler Miedema
- Seneschal — Jimmy MacDonald
- Sewer — Luke Robinson-Grant
- A British noble, attendant on the Court of Vortigern — Jessica Brown
- Saxon nobles, soldiers, and other attendants — Amanda Debison, Claire St-Francois, Emma Lavender, Jessica Brown
- Vortigern, King of Britain — Andrew Pelrine
- Arthur, the British Champion — Sebastien Labelle
- Tristram, his Esquire — Robert Murphy
- Scout, another Esquire — Christine Milburn
- Taliessin, Chief of the Bards — Matthew Peach, Dana Carly Andrews, Myrthin Staag, Katie MacDonald
- Guenever, Daughter of Vortigern, betrothed to Arthur — Jessica Jerome
- Bards, Knights of the Round Table, nobles, maskers, etc. — Matthew Peach, Dana Carly Andrews, Myrthin Staag, Katie MacDonald, Andrew Pelrine
- The Fairy (or Lady) of The Lake — Stephanie Barone
- Several Fairies, the Fairy's attendants—Claire St-Francois, Emma Lavender, Jessica Brown, Christine Milburm
- Hela, Queen of the Infernal Regions — Amanda Debison
- Incubus, a frozen demon — Matthew Peach, Dana Carly Andrews, Myrthin Staag, Katie MacDonald
- The Fatal Sisters:
- Urd, the past — Andrew Pelrine
- Verandi, the present — Jessica Brown
- Schulda, the future — Claire St-Francois
- The Giants of Frost; Demons of the Frozen Regions — Tyler Miedema, Jimmy MacDonald, Luke Robinson-Grant
- Demons of the Moon — Amanda Debison, Claire St-Francois, Emma Lavender, Jessica Brown
