= Chester House, Wimbledon =

Historic house in London, England

Coordinates: 51.422067°N 0.227193°W

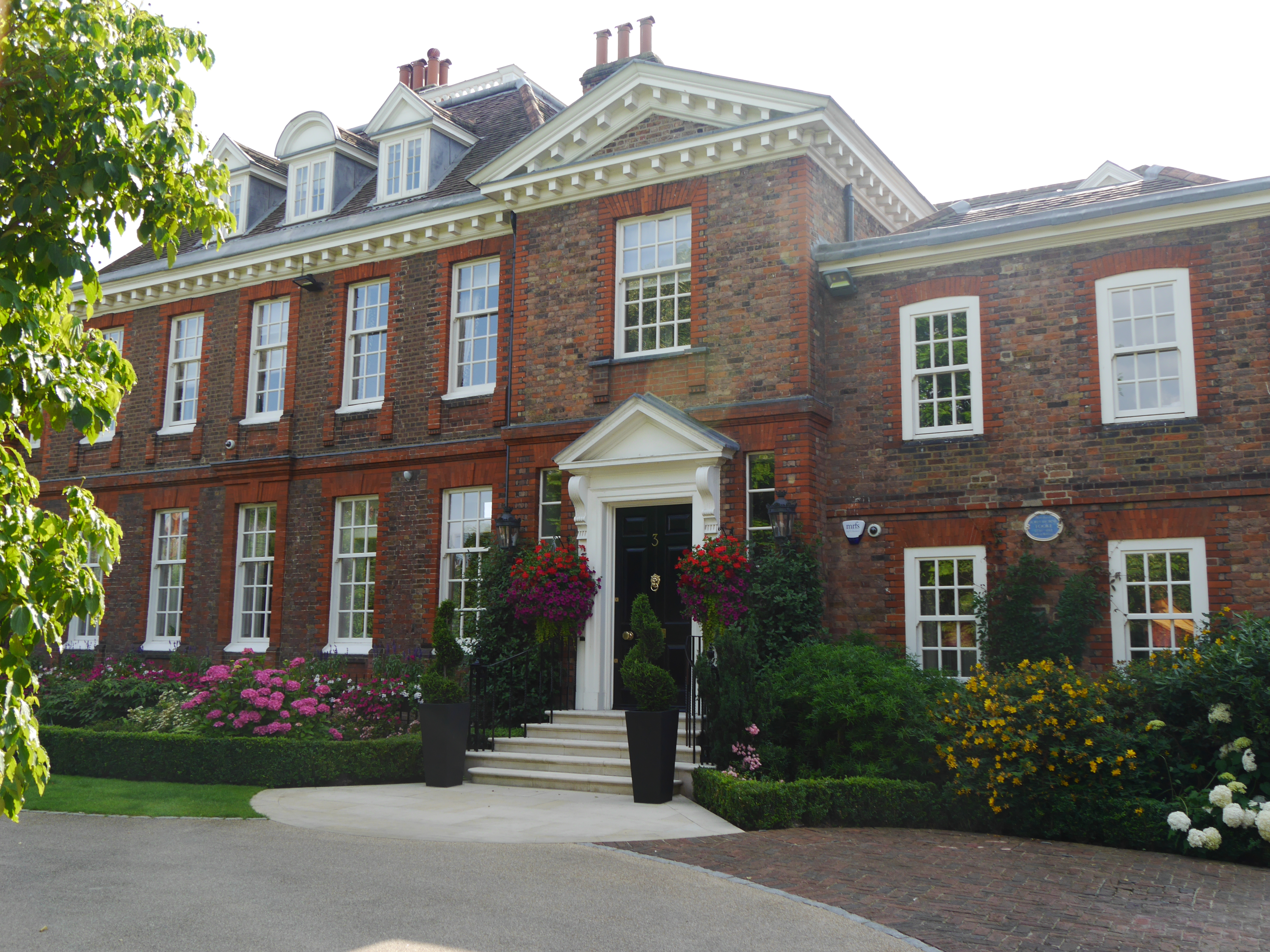
Chester House, 2016

Chester House is a Grade II listed house on the west side of Wimbledon Common, Wimbledon, London, built in about 1700 or earlier.

The radical politician and reformer John Horne Tooke lived there from 1792 until his death in 1812.
