= John Thelwall =

British orator and radical

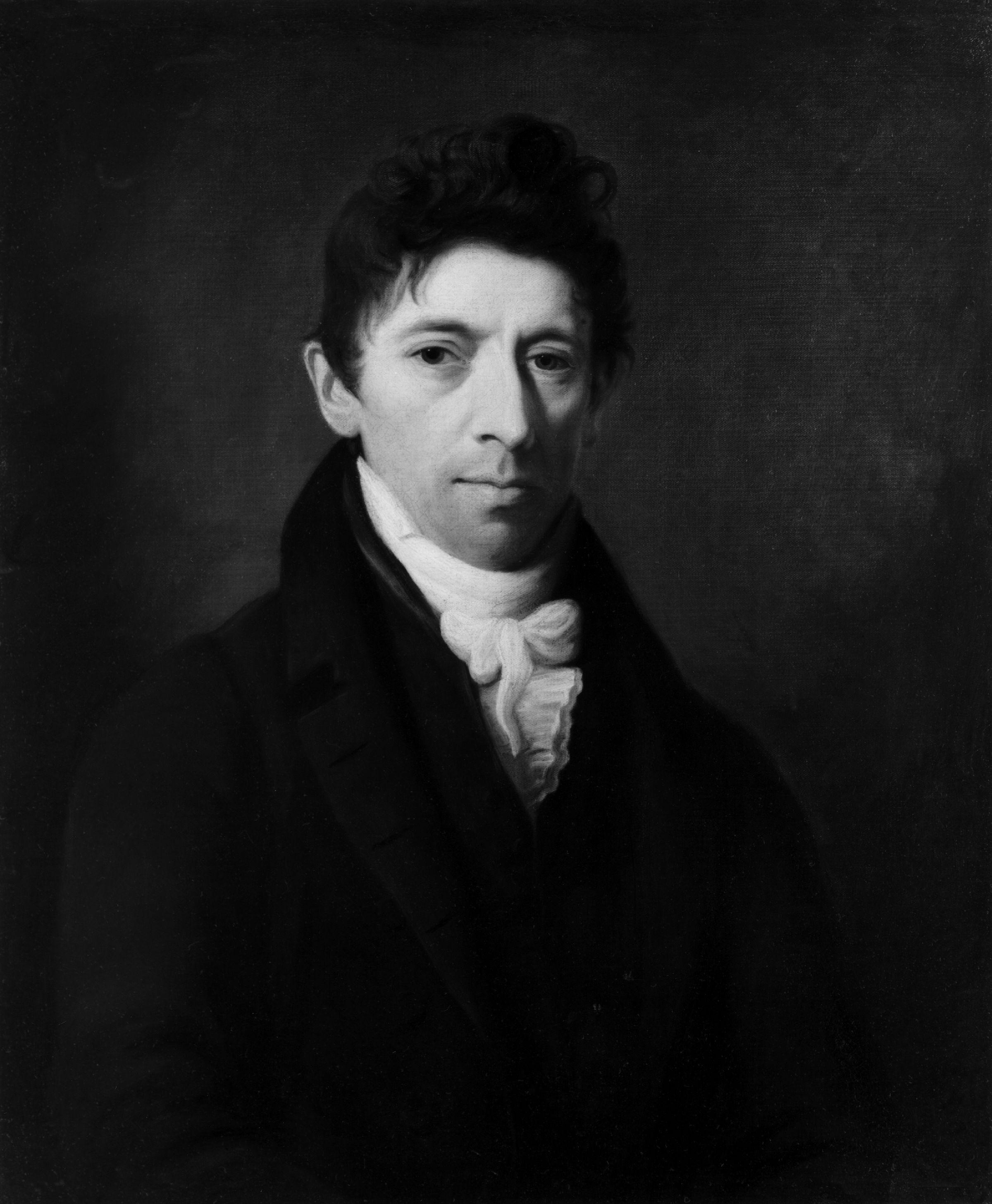
- Thelwall, depicted by John Hazlitt prior to 1830. From the collections of the National Portrait Gallery
- Born: July 27, 1764; Covent Garden, London, Kingdom of Great Britain
- Died: February 17, 1834 (aged 69); Bath, Somerset, United Kingdom of Great Britain and Ireland
- Education: Highgate school

John Thelwall (27 July 1764 – 17 February 1834) was a radical British orator, writer, political reformer, journalist, poet, elocutionist and speech therapist.

== Life ==
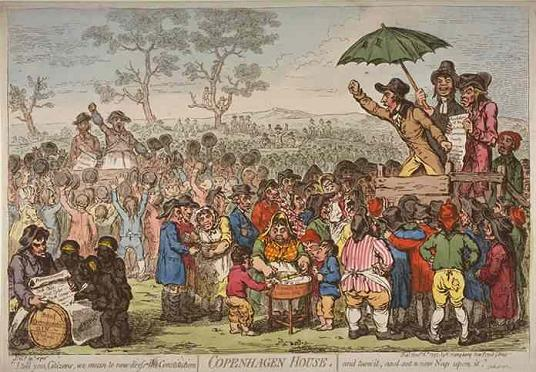
"Copenhagen house" (1795) by James Gillray, depicting Thelwall

Thelwall was born in Covent Garden, London, but was descended from a Welsh family which had its seat at Plas y Ward, Denbighshire. He was the son of a silk merchant, Joseph Thelwall, who died in 1772 leaving the family in economic distress. He attended Highgate School between 1774 and 1777 but had to leave school to help his mother, who had decided to keep the silk business running.

Thelwall's fondness for books showed up at an early age, earning him the scorn of his mother. It also made it impossible for him to fulfill an apprenticeship as a tailor. Young Thelwall also tried to make a living in an attorney's office, but his morals and eccentricity made him quit the job and try to depend on his writing as a journalist and editor.

Thelwall also developed a significant interest in medical science and attended lectures at Guy's and St Thomas hospitals in London; he was friends with Astley Cooper, a renowned surgeon in London. Thelwall's particular interest lay in understanding and participating in topical debates concerning cognition and 'vitality'. Jasmin Solomonescu argues that "Thelwall's medical training became compounded with his radical politics and developing theories of language and the imagination to provide a model and a lexicon for his vision of reform". In 1793, Thelwall presented a paper at the Physical Society in London in which he debated the subject of 'animal vitality'; the paper was subsequently published as An Essay Towards a Definition of Animal Vitality (1793). Considering the views of several well-known sources, Thelwall proposed that vitality or life was a combination of 'specific organisation' and 'proper stimuli'; blood is the means by which the 'stimuli' is conveyed to different parts of the body: 'I consider the blood independent of its nutritive power, as the specific medium by which the stimuli must be conveyed to the different parts of the organised frame, so as to produce the Vital Action. This Blood in its passage through the Lungs, collects a something, which generates a specific heat....But what is this something, this vivifying principle?...Something that is contained in the atmosphere, something of a powerful and exquisitely subtile nature'. Thelwall's views formed part of a larger debate concerning the relationship between the emerging scientific understandings and traditional views regarding the divine nature of creation.

Thelwall's career as an editor and journalist was quite successful, but the highlight of this period was his political activism. In the wake of the French Revolution, he became "intoxicated in the French doctrines of the day". He started to hold talks in London's radical societies and, having made acquaintance with fellow radical John Horne Tooke, and in 1792 co-founded the federation of radical clubs and societies, the London Corresponding Society.

In 1794 he, Horne Tooke and Thomas Hardy were tried for treason following lectures protesting at the arrest of other political activists. After spending some time at the Tower and at Newgate, the three were acquitted. Government officials who considered him to be the most dangerous man in Britain continued to hound him even after his acquittal. In 1795, after prime minister William Pitt the Younger's Gagging Acts (the Treason Act and Seditious Meetings Act) received Royal Assent, Thelwall's lectures had a shift in theme, from contemporary political comment to the history of Rome to dodge censorship.

Still, loyalists stormed Thelwall's public outings, forcing him to leave London and tour England. At King's Lynn, Wisbech and many of the other lectures in eastern England angry mobs impeded the hearings. At Great Yarmouth in August 1796, Royal Navy sailors set on by their captain broke up the meeting. In 1798 Thelwall decided to retire from politics.

Thelwall also wrote poetry and in the second half of the 1790s associated with Romantic poets such as Samuel Taylor Coleridge and William Wordsworth. Coleridge praised Thelwell as "intrepid, eloquent, and honest; perhaps the only acting democrat that is honest". Through his correspondence and meetings with these poets Thelwall would forge a link between the Romantic movement in poetry and radical politics. Thelwall built himself a "hermitage" at Llyswen Farm, Brecknockshire, during his exile in Wales. His friends William and Dorothy Wordsworth and Samuel Taylor Coleridge visited him there in August 1798.

In 1800 Thelwall reappeared as an elocution teacher, which in practice was a combination of speech therapist and rhetoric teacher.

His career was very successful, and by 1818 he had earned enough money to buy a journal, The Champion, through which he called for parliamentary reform and in which he "denounced the government’s actions in the Peterloo massacre, and voiced scepticism about the Cato Street conspiracy". His volcanic style and political views, though, were not fitting for the middle-class public of the journal, which ended up in considerable losses. Thelwall therefore resumed his lecture touring and died in Bath during one of those tours.

== Personal life ==
Thelwall married twice. He married Susannah Vellum at Oakham in 1791. She died in 1816, leaving him four children to support. In 1837 his second wife, Cecil, wrote a biography on the early life of her husband.

Thelwall's eldest son was the clergyman and scholar Algernon Sidney Thelwall and his lesser-known younger son was called John Hampden Thelwall or Hampden Thelwall. Both sons were named after 17th-century republicans.

== Legacy ==
In the field of politics Thelwall promoted "democratic reform, universal suffrage and freedom of speech". Steve Poole has argued: "Thelwall's was perhaps the most important individual voice in the history of British radicalism... Nobody was better than Thelwall at communicating the Rights of Man to a wide audience."

In the field of speech therapy, he was the "first to make speech correction a profession" and the first to write a book on the subject and to establish a school.

In the film Pandaemonium (2000), Thelwall was played by Andy Serkis.

A restoration project on Thelwall's grave in St Swithin's burial ground in Walcot, Bath was launched in 2006 by the Regional History Centre at University of the West of England (UWE).

In October 2009, the Dalhousie University Theatre Department produced the first staging of Thelwall's 1801 melodrama The Fairy of the Lake, as a complement to the John Thelwall conference being hosted at the time by the University's English Department.

A blue plaque was erected in 2018 by English Heritage at 40 Bedford Place, Bloomsbury, London, where he lived and worked, 1806–1813.

== Works ==
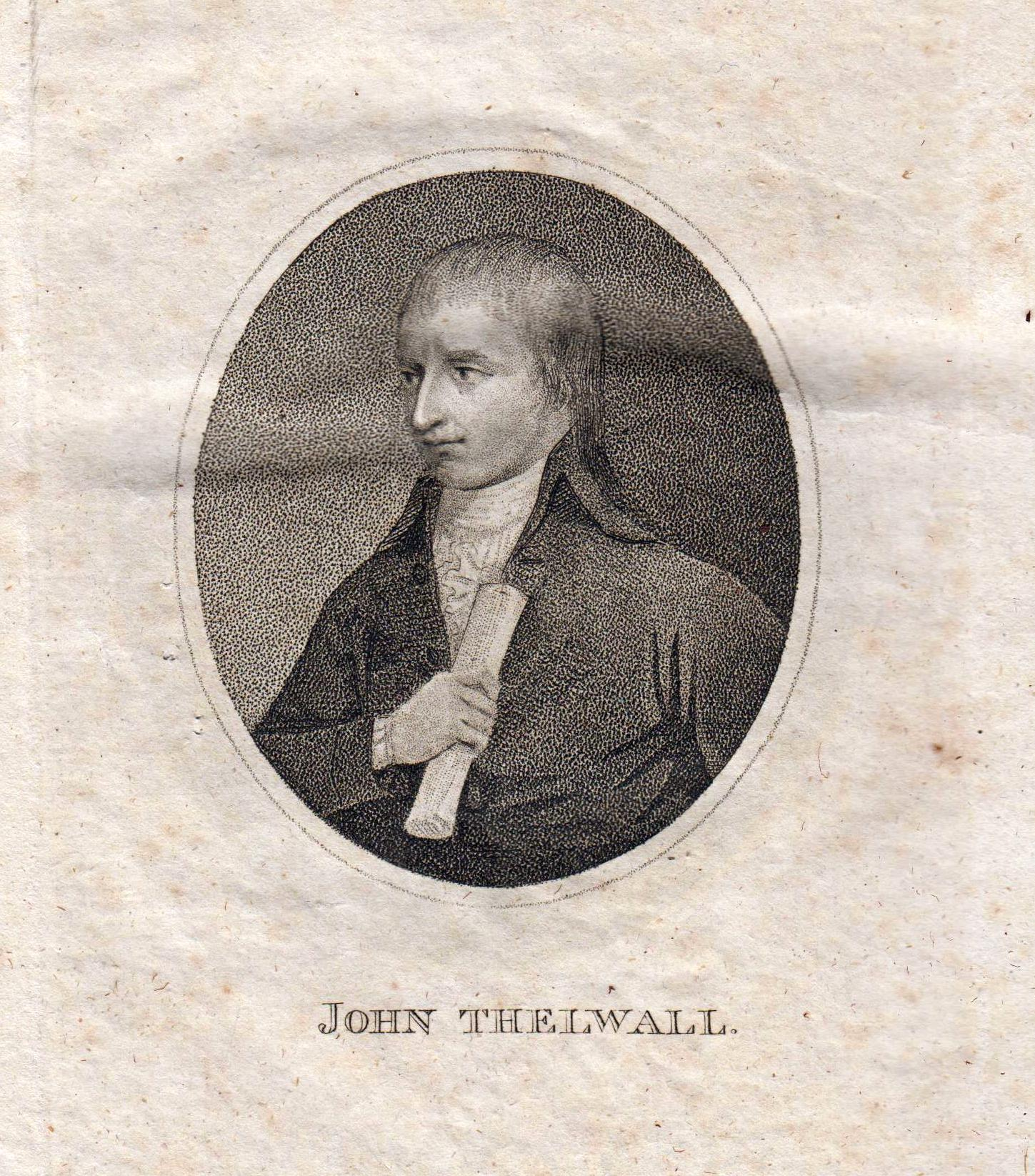
John Thelwall, aged 32, from John Baxter's A new and impartial history of England, 1796

- Poems on Various Subjects (1787)
- Incle and Yarico (1787)
- The Incas (1792)
- An essay towards a definition of animal vitality (1793)
- The Peripatetic; or, Sketches of the Heart, of Nature and Society; in a Series of Politico-Sentimental Journals (1793)
- Poems written in close confinement in the Tower and Newgate (1795)
- The Natural and Constitutional Right of Britons to Annual Parliaments, Universal Suffrage, and the Freedom of Popular Association (1795)
- The Tribune (1795–96)
- The Rights of Nature Against the Usurpations of Establishments (1796)
- Sober Reflections on the Seditious and Inflammatory Letter of the Rt. Hon. Edmund Burke to a Noble Lord (1796)
- Poems chiefly written in retirement … with a prefatory memoir of the life of the author (1801)
- The Fairy of the Lake (1801)
- The Daughter of Adoption (1801)
- Selections, and original articles, read and recited, in illustration of Mr. Thelwall's lectures on the science and practice of elocution (1802)
- Poem and Oration on the Death of Lord Nelson (1805)
- Vestibule of Eloquence (1808)
- Letter to Henry Cline (1810)
- Selections for the illustration of a course of instructions on the rhythmus and utterance of the English language: with an Introductory essay on the application of rhythmical science to the treatment of impediments, and the improvement of our national oratory; and an elementary analysis of the science and practice of elocution, composition, &c. (1812)
- Treatment of Cases of Defective Utterance (1814)
- The poetical recreations of the Champion and his literary correspondents; with a selection of essays, literary & critical, which have appeared in the Champion newspaper (1822)
- John Thelwall: Selected Poetry and Poetics (New York City, Palgrave Macmillan, 2015) ISBN 978-1-137-34482-3. Judith Thompson, ed.

== See also ==
- 1794 Treason Trials
