= Auguste Millière =

- Born: 27 June 1820; Paris, France
- Died: 26 December 1908 (aged 88); London, United Kingdom of Great Britain and Ireland
- Occupation: Painter

Auguste Millière (27 June 1820 – 26 December 1908) was a French-born painter who later became British and worked in London during the second half of the nineteenth century. He is known for several portrait paintings after earlier works and photographs, including portraits of Thomas Paine and Jacques Offenbach.

== Biography ==
Auguste Millière was born in Paris in 1820. He was the son of Claude Millière, described as “hairdresser to the King and to Monseigneur the Dauphin”, and Marie-Victoire Thillier.

On 13 July 1873 in London, Auguste Millière married Rebecca Amy Bryanashwell, a dressmaker. The couple lived in Enfield, in north London. By the 1881 United Kingdom census he was recorded as an “artist painter”, born in France and naturalised as a British subject. He died on 26 December 1908 in London at the retirement home “The Haven of Rest”.

== Works ==
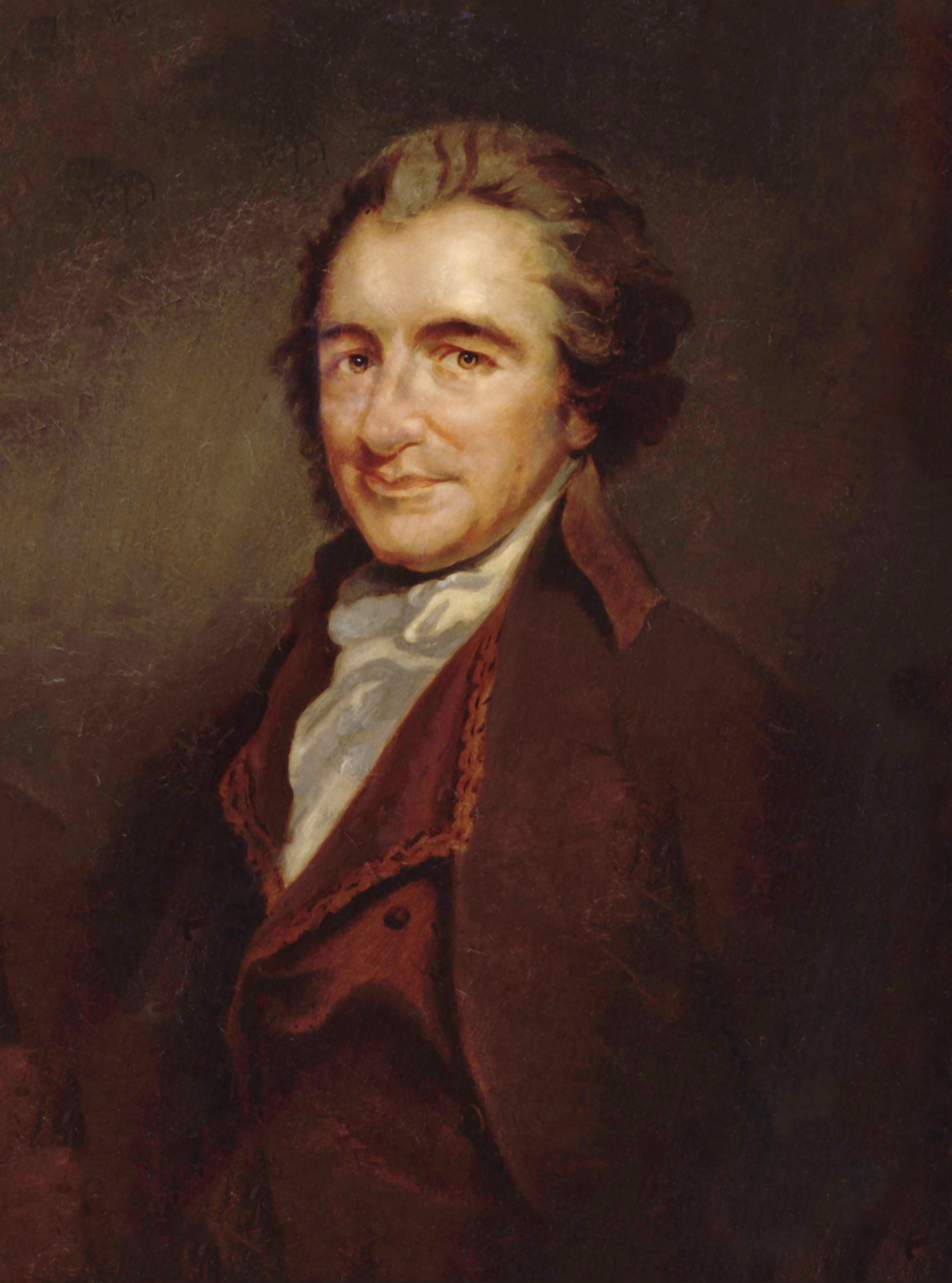
Portrait of Thomas Paine by Auguste Millière.

- Oil portrait of Thomas Paine, c. 1876, after an engraving by William Sharp, itself based on a portrait by George Romney. The work is now held in storage at the National Portrait Gallery, London.
- Oil portrait of Jacques Offenbach, c. 1881, · (Note: The work is sometimes mistakenly attributed to Maurice Millière (1871–1946), who would have been only ten years old at the time.) after a photograph by Nadar.
- Portrait of the Reverend C. E. J. Carter, painted in 1898 from a photograph for the new parish hall of St James’s Church in the Enfield district of London.
- Oil portrait of a young girl, · (Note: The work is sometimes mistakenly attributed to Maurice Millière (1871–1946).) painted before 1889, after the original by Jean-Baptiste Greuze then held at the National Gallery, London.

== Reception ==
Contemporary newspapers mention Millière’s work. In 1898, The Middlesex Gazette reported on the unveiling of a portrait of the Reverend C. E. J. Carter painted by Millière:

Prominent amongst these was the unveiling of an excellent oil painting of the host, which had been presented to the trustees of the hall by the clever Mr. A. Milliere, as a permanent reminder of the work done by Mr Carter at the Lock . The portrait was painted from a photograph of the reverend gentleman taken some four years ago, and is therefore not quite up to date. It is, however, most artistic and well finished work, and attracted the liveliest interest of the visitors on Monday.
