= John Horne Tooke =

British politician (1736–1812)

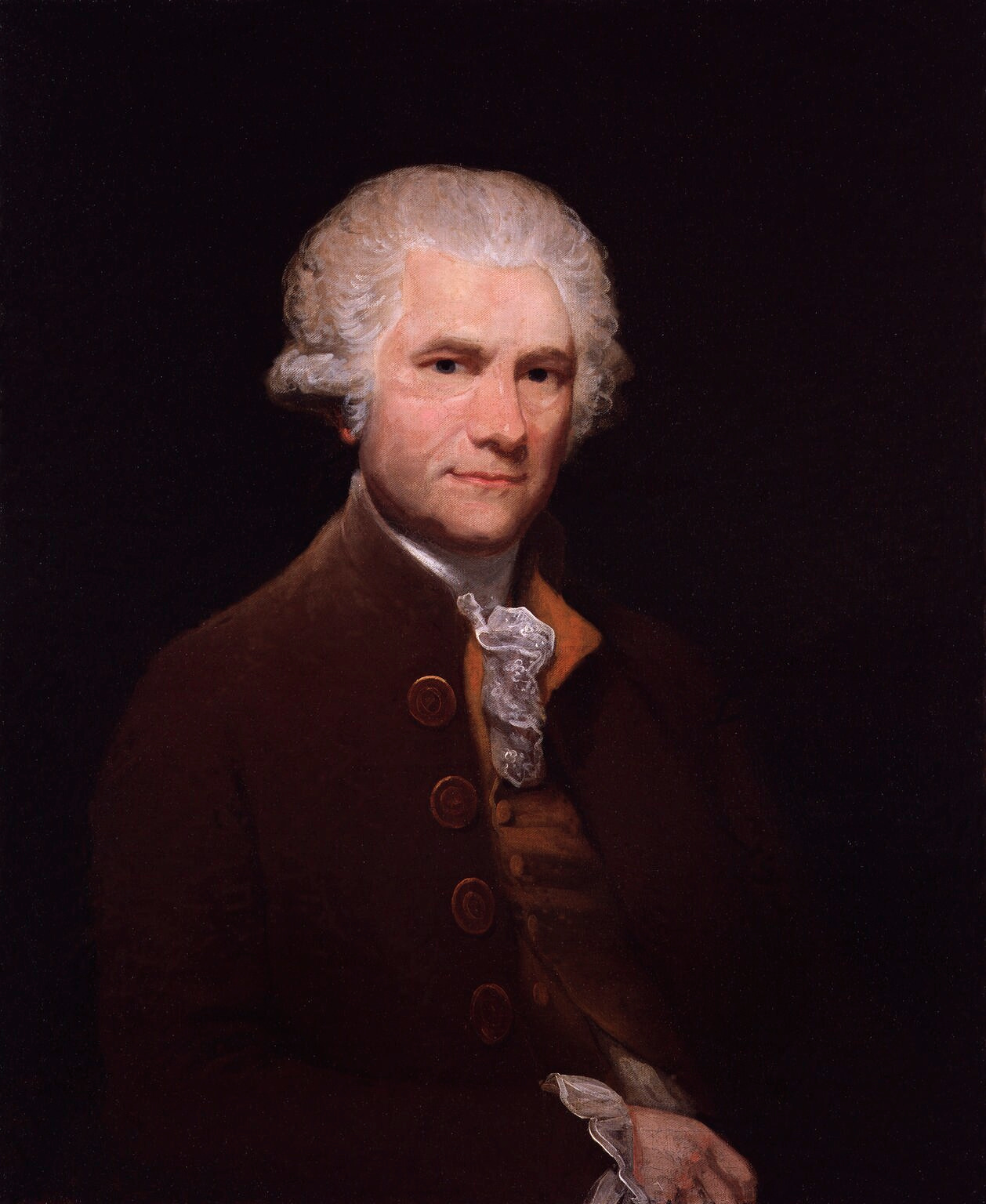
- Portrait by Thomas Hardy, c. 1778–1790

Member of Parliament for Old Sarum
- In office 1801–1802 Serving with George Hardinge
- Monarch: George III
- Prime Minister: Henry Addington
- Preceded by: George Yonge
- Succeeded by: Henry Alexander
- Constituency: Old Sarum

Personal details
- Born: John Horne; 25 June 1736 Long Acre, Westminster, England
- Died: 18 March 1812 (aged 75) Chester House, Wimbledon, England
- Party: Radical

John Horne Tooke (25 June 1736 – 18 March 1812) – known as John Horne until 1782 when he added the surname of his friend William Tooke to his own – was an English clergyman, politician and philologist. Associated with radical proponents of parliamentary reform, he was among those Prime Minister William Pitt put to trial for treason in 1794, with the intent of quashing the British radical movement of the 1790s.

== Early life and work ==
He was the third son of John Horne, of Newport Street, Long Acre, Westminster, a member of the Worshipful Company of Poulters. As a youth at Eton College, he had claimed "that his father was an eminent Turkey merchant" implying that, rather than a dealer in poultry, he traded with the Eastern Mediterranean. Before Eton, he had been at school in Soho Square, in a Kentish village, and from 1744 to 1746 at Westminster School. He was blinded in his right eye during a schoolboy fight.

On 12 January 1754 he was admitted as sizar at St John's College, Cambridge, and took his degree of B.A. in 1758, coming in last. One of the senior optimes, Richard Beadon, his lifelong friend, afterwards Bishop of Bath and Wells, was the Wrangler in the same year. Horne was admitted on 9 November 1756 as student at the Inner Temple, becoming friends with John Dunning and Lloyd Kenyon. His father wished him to take orders in the Church of England, and he was ordained deacon on 23 September 1759 and priest on 23 November 1760.

For a few months he was usher (assistant teacher) at a boarding school at Blackheath. On 26 September 1760 he became perpetual curate of New Brentford, the incumbency which his father had purchased for him. Horne Tooke retained this poor living until 1773. During part of this time (1763–1764) he travelled in France, acting as a 'bear-leader' (travelling tutor) to a wealthy man.

== Political career ==
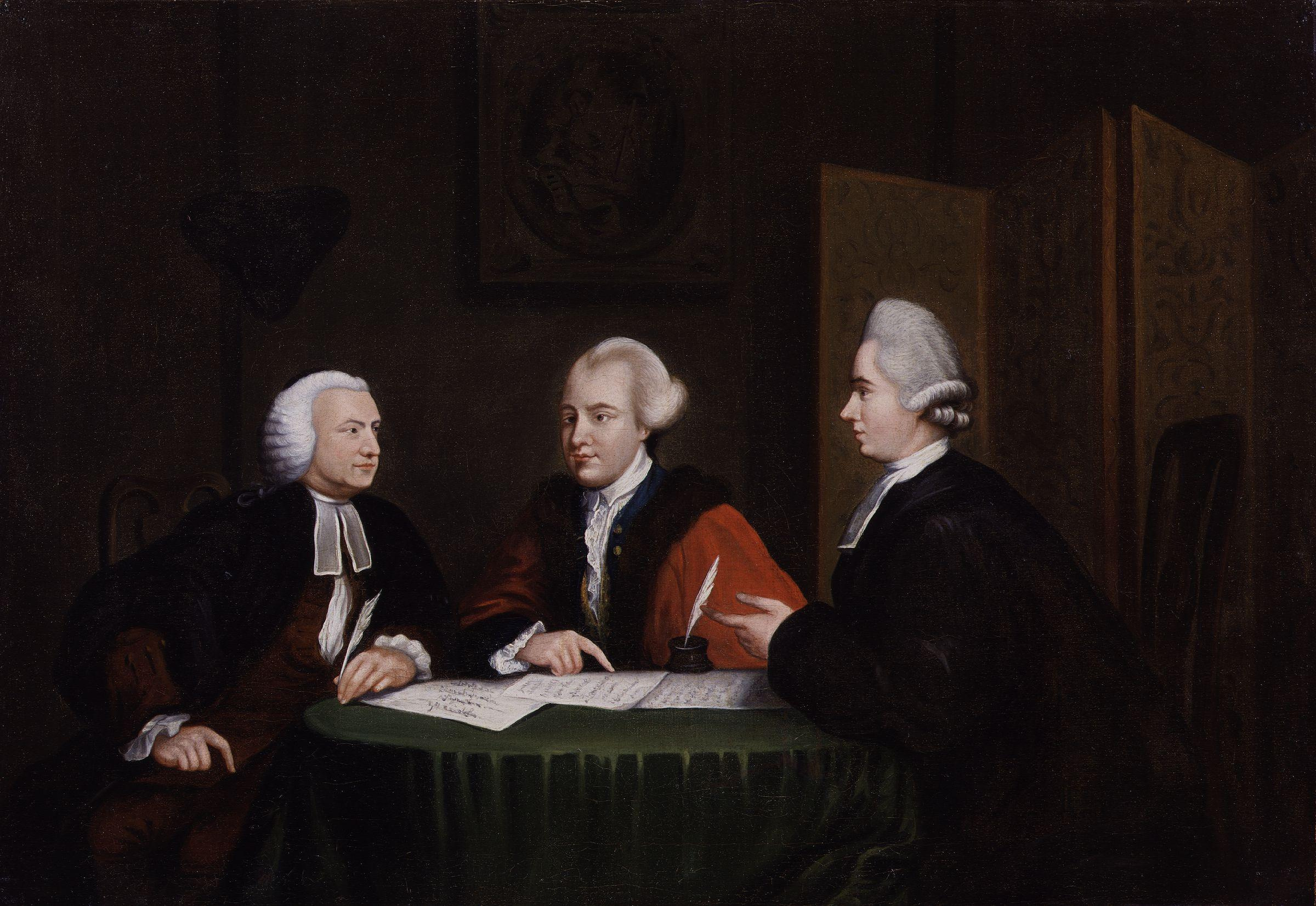
A portrait of John Horne Tooke (right) in discussion with John Glynn and John Wilkes

The excitement created by the actions of John Wilkes led Horne into politics, and in 1765 he brought out a scathing pamphlet on Bute and Mansfield, entitled "The Petition of an Englishman".

In the autumn of 1765 he escorted another rich young man to Italy. In Paris he met Wilkes, and from Montpellier, in January 1766, addressed a letter to him which began the quarrel between them. In the summer of 1767 Horne returned, and in 1768 secured the return of Wilkes to parliament for Middlesex. With inexhaustible energy he promoted the legal proceedings over the riot in St George's Fields when a youth named Allen was killed, and exposed the irregularity in the judge's order for the execution of two Spitalfields weavers. His dispute with George Onslow, MP for Surrey, who at first supported and then threw over Wilkes for place, culminated in a civil action, ultimately decided, after the reversal of a verdict which had been obtained through the charge of Lord Mansfield, in Horne's favour, and in the loss by his opponent of his seat in parliament. An influential association, called The Society for Supporting the Bill of Rights, was founded, mainly through the exertions of Horne and Wilkes, with the support of John Wheble, in 1769, but the members were soon divided into two opposite camps, and in 1771 Horne and Wilkes, their respective leaders, broke out into open dispute.

On 1 July 1771 Horne obtained at Cambridge his degree of M.A., though not without some opposition from members of both the political parties. Earlier in that year he claimed for the public the right of printing an account of parliamentary debates, and after a long struggle, the right was definitely established. In the same year (1771), Horne argued with Junius, and ended in disarming his masked antagonist.

=== Study of law and personal legal problems ===
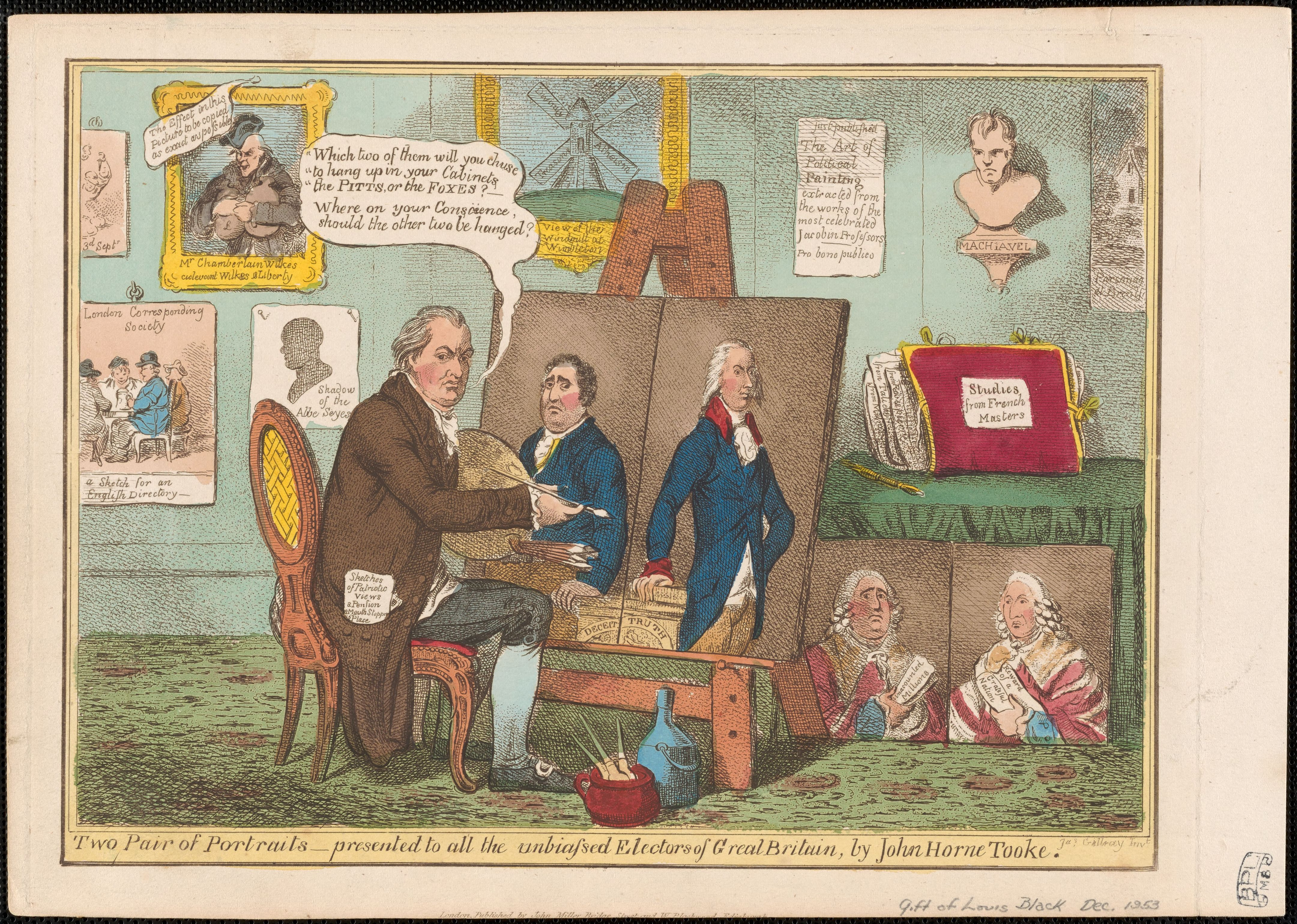
"Two Pair of Portraits;" – presented to all the unbiassed Electors of Great Britain, an anti-Whig caricature published 1798 by James Gillray showing Fox as the personification of vice next to a portrait of Pitt as the embodiment of honesty, followed by portraits of their fathers, Lord Holland and William Pitt senior displayed below. The title is an allusion to the pamphlet by the same title written by Horne Tooke.

Horne resigned his benefice in 1773 and began the study of the law and philology. An accident, however, occurred at this moment which largely affected his future. His friend William Tooke had purchased a considerable estate, including Purley Lodge, south of the town of Croydon in Surrey. The possession of this property brought about frequent disputes with an adjoining landowner, Thomas de Grey, and, after many actions in the courts, de Grey's friends endeavoured to obtain, by a bill forced through the houses of parliament, the privileges which the law had not assigned to him (February 1774). Horne, thereupon, by a bold libel on the Speaker, drew public attention to the case, and though he himself was placed for a time in the custody of the serjeant-at-arms, the clauses which were injurious to the interest of Tooke were eliminated from the bill. Tooke declared his intention of making Horne the heir to his fortune, and during his lifetime he bestowed upon him large gifts of money.

No sooner had this matter been happily settled than Horne found himself involved in serious trouble. For his conduct in signing the advertisement soliciting subscriptions for the relief of the relatives of the Americans "murdered by the king's troops at Lexington and Concord," he was tried at the Guildhall on 4 July 1777, before Lord Mansfield, found guilty, and committed to the King's Bench Prison in St George's Fields, from which he only emerged after a year's durance, and after a loss in fines and costs amounting to £1,200.

Soon after his release he applied to be called to the bar, but his application was rejected on the grounds that his orders in the Church were indelible. Horne thereupon tried his fortune, but without success, on farming some land in Huntingdonshire. Two tracts about this time exercised great influence in the country. One of them, Fads Addressed to Landholders, etc. (1780), written by Horne in conjunction with others, criticizing the measures of Lord North's ministry, passed through numerous editions; the other, A Letter on Parliamentary Reform (1782), addressed by him to Dunning, set out a scheme of reform, which he afterwards withdrew in favour of that advocated by William Pitt the Younger.

On his return from Huntingdonshire he became once more a frequent guest at Tooke's house at Purley, and in 1782 assumed the name of Horne Tooke. In 1786 Horne Tooke conferred perpetual fame upon his benefactor's country house by adopting, as a second title of his elaborate philological treatise of Epea Pteroenta — the Greek phrase ἔπεα πτερόεντα ("winged words") comes from Homer — the more popular though misleading title of The Diversions of Purley. The treatise at once attracted attention in England and the Continent. The first part was published in 1786, the second in 1805. The best edition is that which was published in 1829, under the editorship of Richard Taylor, with the additions written in the author's interleaved copy.

Between 1782 and 1790 Horne Tooke gave his support to Pitt, and in the election for Westminster, in 1784, threw all his energies into opposition to Fox. With Fox he was never on terms of friendship, and Samuel Rogers, in his Table Talk, asserts that their antipathy was so pronounced that at a dinner party given by a prominent Whig not the slightest notice was taken by Fox of the presence of Horne Tooke. It was after the election of Westminster in 1788 that Horne Tooke depicted the rival statesmen (Lord Chatham and Lord Holland, William Pitt and Charles James Fox) in his celebrated pamphlet Two Pair of Portraits.

=== Bids for office and treason trial ===
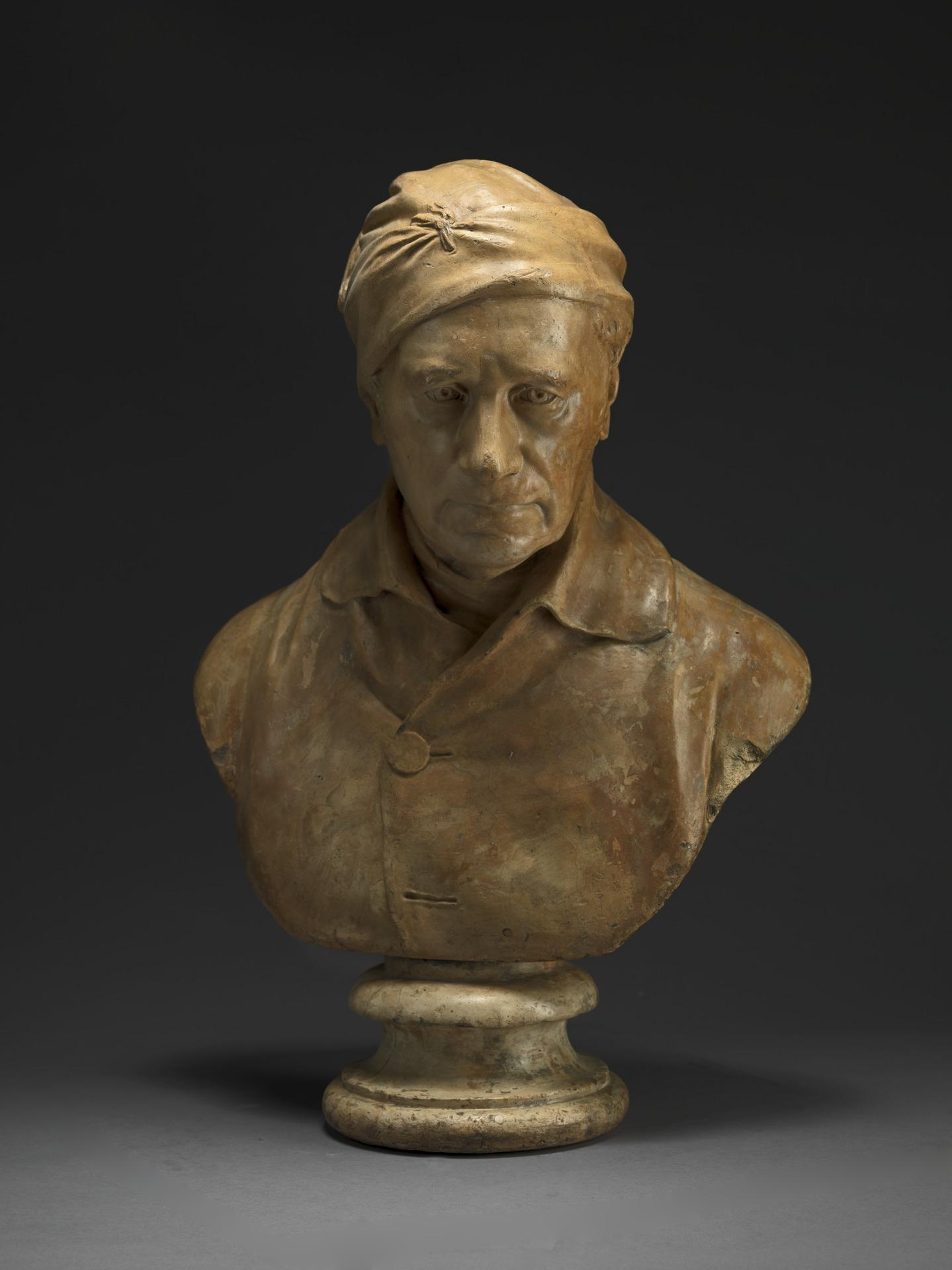
Bust of Horne Tooke (1811) by Francis Leggatt Chantrey

At the general election of 1790, Horne Tooke stood as a candidate for the Westminster constituency, in opposition to Fox and Lord Hood, but was defeated. At a second attempt in 1796, he was again at the bottom of the poll. In the meantime, the excesses of the French republicans had provoked reaction in England, and the Tory ministry adopted a policy of repression.

Early on the morning of 16 May 1794 Horne Tooke was detained and conveyed to the Tower of London. His was one of a series of arrests that placed him in the company of a number of prominent figures associated with the London Corresponding Society, its opposition to the war with France and call for democratic reform, among them Thomas Hardy, Thomas Spence, Thomas Holcroft, and John Thelwall. For the government of William Pitt their trials in November for treason proved an acute embarrassment. Juries were not ready to accept mere expression of political opinion as evidence of plots against King and Parliament. When the evidence running to four printed volumes failed to impress in the case of Hardy, the courts were unable to take seriously the charges against his associates. Horne Tooke jeered at the Attorney-General and clowned in the dock. His jury took only eight minutes to settle on acquittal.

Horne Tooke's public life after this event was only distinguished by one act of importance. Through the influence of the second Lord Camelford, he was returned to parliament at a by-election on 14 February 1801 for the pocket borough of Old Sarum. When he took his seat two days later an observer described him as "very old" (he was then aged 64) and "lame", "walking about the House from bench to bench ... followed by Sir Francis Burdett", his sponsor and a former pupil.

Lord Temple endeavoured to secure his exclusion on the ground that he had taken orders in the Church of England, and one of James Gillray's caricatures delineates the two politicians, Temple and Camelford, playing at battledore and shuttlecock, with Horne Tooke as the shuttlecock. The Addington ministry would not support this suggestion, but instead secured passage of the House of Commons (Disqualifications) Act 1801, which rendered all persons in holy orders ineligible to sit in the House of Commons with effect from the 1802 general election.

== Later years and legacy ==
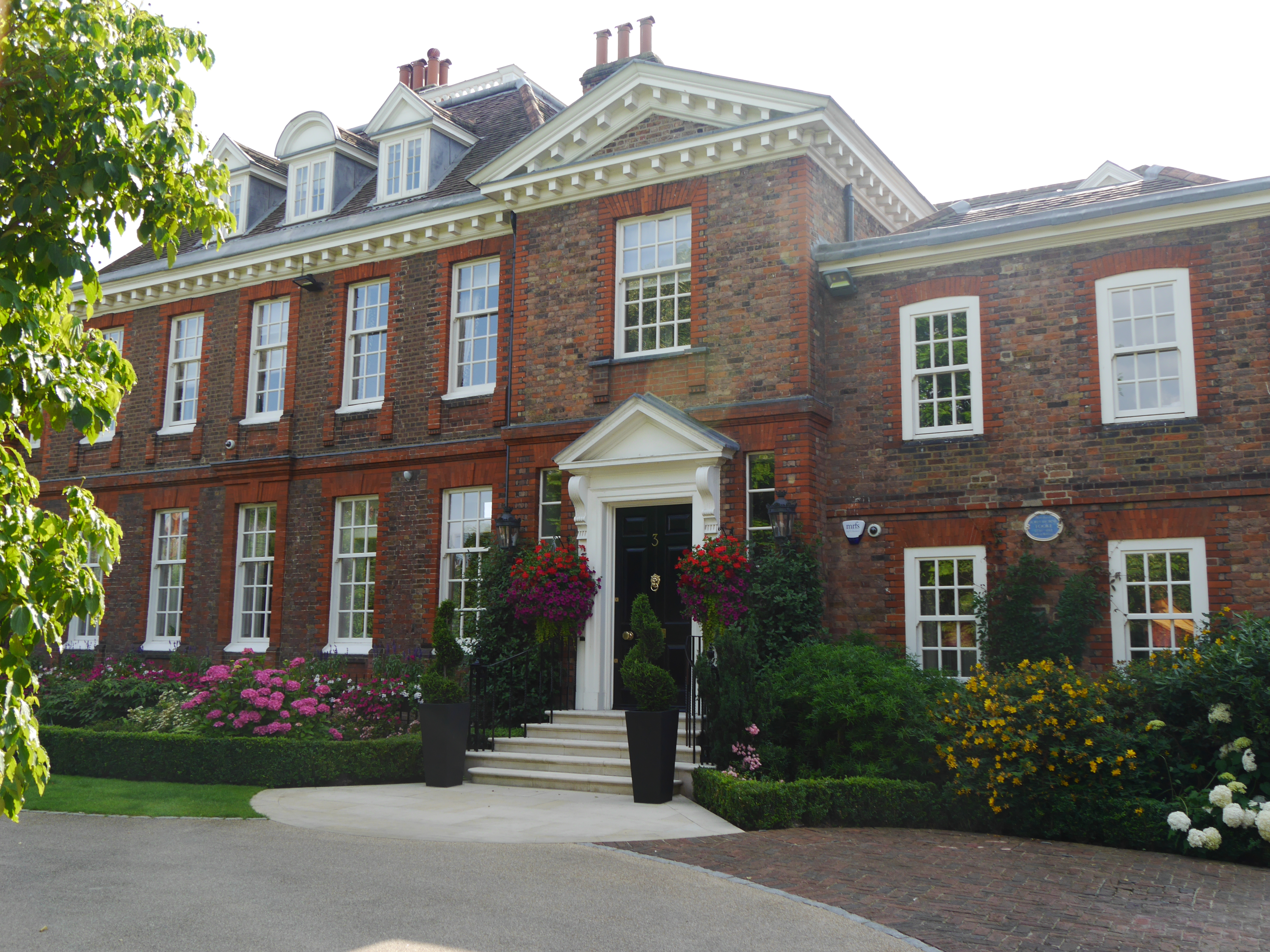
Chester House, Wimbledon, in 2016

The last years of Horne Tooke's life, from 1792 until his death in 1812, were spent in retirement, at Chester House on the west side of Wimbledon Common.

Horne Tooke continued to hold Sunday parties, and his biographer described the politicians and the men of letters who gathered at his home. Horne Tooke's conversational powers were said to rival those of Samuel Johnson. Thanks to the generosity of his friends, Horne Tooke avoided poverty in his later years, and he was able to assist amd provide for his illegitimate children.

Horne Tooke fell ill early in 1810 and died in 1812 at his house in Wimbledon, London, and was buried with his mother at Ealing. An altar-tomb stands to his memory in Ealing churchyard. A catalogue of his library was printed in 1813.

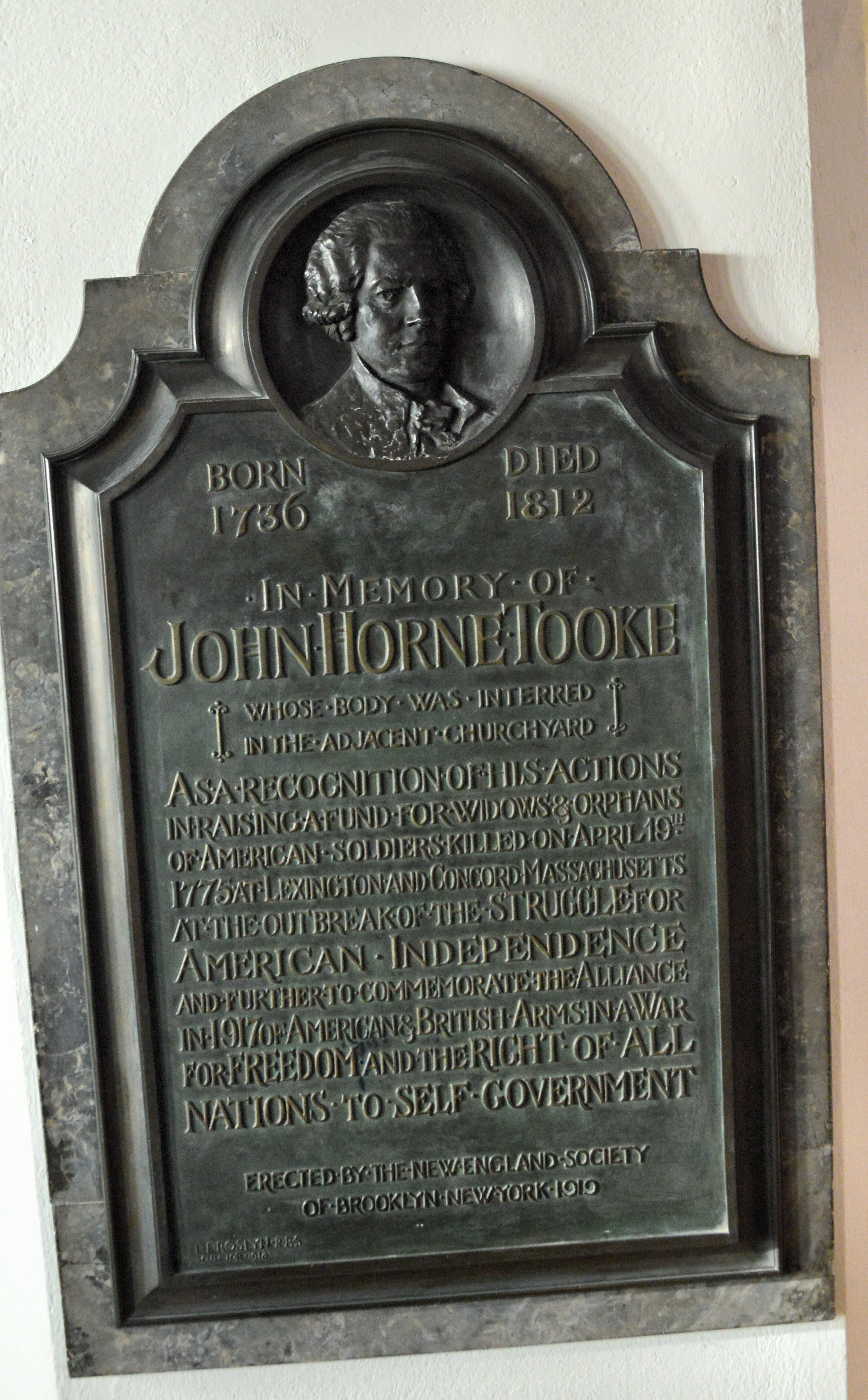
Memorial (1919) by Louis Frederick Roslyn in St Mary's Church, Ealing

Many of Horne Tooke's sayings are preserved in the table talk of Samuel Rogers and of Samuel Taylor Coleridge; the main facts of his life were set out by Thorold Rogers, in his Historical Gleanings, 2nd series. The Life of Horne Tooke, by Alexander Stephens, was written by an admirer who only knew Horne Tooke as an old man. William Hamilton Reid made a compilation, noticed in the Quarterly Review, June 1812, by John William Ward. He is the subject of Coleridge's poem "Addressed to J. Horne Tooke and the Company Who Met on June 28, 1796 to Celebrate His Poll at the Westminster Election".

== Selected works ==
=== Philology ===
- A Letter to John Dunning, Esq. (London: J. Johnson, 1778): full text in facsimile.
- Έπεα Πτερόεντα: Or, the Diversions of Purley, part 1 (London: J. Johnson, 1798): full text in facsimile.
- Έπεα Πτερόεντα: Or, the Diversions of Purley, part 2 (London: J. Johnson, 1805): full text in facsimile.

Parliament of the United Kingdom
Preceded by George Hardinge; Sir George Yonge, Bt	Member of Parliament for Old Sarum; 1801–1802; With: George Hardinge	Succeeded by Nicholas Vansittart; Henry Alexander
