= Royal Proclamation Against Seditious Writings and Publications =

The Royal Proclamation Against Seditious Writings and Publications was issued by George III of Great Britain on 21 May 1792 in response to the growth of radicalism in Britain inspired by the French Revolution, in particular the phenomenal popularity of Thomas Paine's Rights of Man.

In April a group of Foxite Whig MPs formed the Society of the Friends of the People to agitate for parliamentary reform, which alarmed the British Prime Minister William Pitt. The draft of the Proclamation had been shown to Opposition leaders and incorporated their criticisms. Pitt had given a draft to the Duke of Portland, who showed it to Fox and other Whigs.

The historian John Ehrman said that while the Proclamation was not occasioned solely by the Rights of Man it was nevertheless "a remarkable tribute to a single book". The Proclamation, enforced at a local level by magistrates, had some success at limiting radical literature. Paine responded to the Proclamation by publishing the Letter Addressed to the Addressers on the Late Proclamation.
