= William Henry Singleton =

American slave, soldier and Christian minister

- Born: August 10, 1843; Craven County, North Carolina, U.S.
- Died: September 7, 1938; Des Moines, Iowa, U.S.
- Burial place: New Haven, Connecticut, U.S.
- Spouse(s): Maria Wanton (d. 1898), Charlotte Hinman
- Children: Multiple children and eight grandchildren
- Military career
- Allegiance: United States (Union)
- Branch: United States Army
- Service years: 1863–1866
- Rank: Sergeant
- Unit: 35th United States Colored Troops
- Conflicts: American Civil War, Siege of Charleston, Battle of Olustee
- Awards: None formally recorded
- Other work: Minister (AME Zion Church), Author, Missionary, Coachman

William Henry Singleton (August 10, 1843 – September 7, 1938) gained freedom in North Carolina and served as a sergeant in the United States Colored Troops during the American Civil War. After its end and emancipation, he moved North to New Haven, Connecticut. There he became literate and a minister in the African Methodist Episcopal Zion Church (AME Zion Church), serving also in Maine and New York.

Born into slavery near New Bern, North Carolina, he was sold as a child but made his way home over 400 miles. During the Civil War, he served as a sergeant in the 35th United States Colored Troops, and recruited men for the First North Carolina Colored Volunteers. After being wounded in the Battle of Olustee, Florida, in February 1864, he was assigned to garrison duty in South Carolina.

As noted, after the war, Singleton moved North to New Haven, Connecticut. Proud of his military service, Singleton marched in parades of Grand Army of the Republic (GAR) veterans, including in 1937 and in 1938 at the age of 95. He suffered a heart attack during that event and died.

While living in Peekskill, New York, he had written and published his autobiography in 1922, an account of his rise from slavery, military service and later life. It was first serialized in a local newspaper. In 1999 the state of North Carolina published a scholarly, annotated edition. His tombstone in New Haven notes his service in the US Colored Troops. Singleton is also recognized in New Bern by a Waymarking plaque about him and his achievements.

== Early life and education ==
In his memoir, Singleton said he was born into slavery on August 10, 1835, in Craven County, North Carolina, near New Bern. (Historians have estimated his birth year as 1843.) He noted that he was not really black, as his mother Lettis (also spelled as Lettice) Singleton was an enslaved woman of mixed race (Singleton described her as "colored"). His father was a white man, who he said was the younger brother of his white master John Singleton. The senior Singleton had one of the largest plantations and the most slaves of any planter in the county. (Singleton, descended from English colonists in Virginia, acquired his wealth by marrying the widow Mrs. Nelson). The memoir noted that all the slaves on the plantation were referred to by the Singleton surname, as was customary in that area; at a neighboring plantation, slaves were referred to by that master's surname.

(According to editors of the 1999 scholarly edition, John H. Nelson was the owner and master of the plantation where William lived when young. Nelson's younger brother also lived there, but they believe William's father was likely another white man, William G. Singleton, a clerk in New Bern. The boy may have been named after that man.)

Singleton later wrote in his memoir, "[M]y presence on the plantation was continually reminding them [the whites] of something they wanted to forget." He said that the brothers quarreled over him. John Singleton (Nelson) sold the boy at age four to a trader, who took him to a widow in Atlanta, Georgia. Singleton said she had a "slave farm", where she trained slaves for domestic service and artisan positions, and sold them at a profit. Singleton said that many were slaves of "good pedigree" like him, suggesting that the widow valued those of partially white ancestry.

Determined to rejoin his mother, at the age of seven William ran away. He showed great resourcefulness in making use of sympathetic whites along the way. He made his way back to New Bern by stagecoach for 400 miles from Atlanta, and walking miles more on foot. His mother hid him for three years in her cabin; he would hide under the floorboards where she stored potatoes in order to escape notice.

After William was discovered, Nelson sold him again. William was held for a time by a Mrs. Wheeler, who he said was kindly. But, hearing that she intended to sell him, he again escaped to New Bern. He found work for a time as a bellhop at the Moore Hotel. Finally the boy returned to the Singleton (Nelson) plantation. His master agreed to keep him and have him work in the fields. William's resourcefulness and persistence as a boy, in order to rejoin his mother, were characteristics he drew from all his life.

== Civil War and military service ==
After the Civil War broke out, at age 26, Singleton gained permission to drill with the First North Carolina Cavalry. Its members were recruited by Samuel Hyman of Craven County, a West Point graduate who became a Confederate officer. Singleton wanted to learn some skills. The company was stationed at New Bern until March 14, 1862. The Union generals Ambrose Burnside and John G. Foster captured New Bern and drove the Confederates back to Kinston.

With the First North Carolina Cavalry in disarray, Singleton escaped and fled to New Bern, where he gained freedom with Union troops. He volunteered as a guide and informant to Union forces, hoping to fight with them. But blacks were not allowed to fight until 1863.

Ten thousand slaves reached the town following the Union occupation. The Union established the Trent River contraband camp to house them and their families. The Army appointed Horace James, a Congregational chaplain from Massachusetts, as the "Superintendent of Negro Affairs for the North Carolina District." He directed operations at the contraband camp, setting up classes for former slaves and organized work details for adults. He also managed development at the Freedmen's Colony of Roanoke Island.

Many men wanted to fight for the Union, and Singleton helped raise a regiment of 1,000 freed slaves in New Bern. Outside their work, he started to train them as troops, using cornstalks as rifles. When President Abraham Lincoln approved the use of blacks in 1863 as armed troops for the Union Army, Singleton's recruits were designated part of the First North Carolina Colored Volunteers, or 35th United States Colored Troops (USCT). This unit included freedmen who had escaped from Virginia. Singleton was promoted to sergeant. When it came time for action, the unit was assigned white officers, as were all the black units. The U.S. Army trained and armed the men, and shipped the regiment to South Carolina, where they participated in the siege of Charleston.

In 1864, the 35th USCT were sent to Florida as part of a campaign to be led by Brigadier General Truman Seymour. The 35th USCT participated in the Battle of Olustee on February 20, 1864. They were commanded by Lt. Colonel William Reed and Major Archibald Bogle. The Union forces gave way before a Confederate ambush, and the 35th USCT and 54th Massachusetts, also a unit of the USCT, lost more than 200 men while helping defend the Union line of retreat. Seymour was severely criticized by the Northern press for his losses in the battle.

In April following this conflict and the Battle of Port Hudson, President Lincoln said,

There have been men who have proposed to me to return to slavery the black warriors of Port Hudson & Olustee to their masters to conciliate the South. I should be damned in time & eternity for doing so.

— April 19, 1864 (Collected Works 7: 506-507)

Wounded at Olustee, Singleton was assigned to a 35th USCT garrison in South Carolina; the state was occupied by Union troops through the remainder of the war. Others of the 35th USCT were assigned to Florida. He was honorably discharged on June 1, 1866.

== Postbellum years ==
Singleton moved to the North, as did many freedmen, where he settled in New Haven, Connecticut. He worked for six years as a coachman for Henry Trowbridge. After his death, Singleton was hired by his brother Tomas Trowbridge, and worked for him for 25 years.

During this period, Singleton joined the AME Zion Church in the city. It was an independent black denomination, the second established in the United States when it was founded by free blacks in New York City in the early 19th century.

Singleton helped with prisoners at the city jail, where he began to do missionary work with the AME Zion Church. He became a deacon and an elder. Singleton also worked to gain an education. He studied and saved to buy books, and taught himself to read and write.

=== Marriage and family ===
Singleton married Maria Wanton in New Haven, and they had a child together. After Maria died in 1898, Singleton served as an itinerant minister in Portland, Maine. After a few years, he moved to New York City, where he married Charlotte Hinman. They later lived in Peekskill, New York. They had children, and eventually eight grandchildren.

=== Maine and New York ===
After his wife Maria died in 1898, Singleton entered the itinerant ministry and devoted all his time to the church. For three years he traveled and evangelized in Portland, Maine.

He moved to New York City and married again. After several years, in 1906 he and his family moved to Peekskill, New York. He worked for various employers through World War I. Through all these years of freedom, Singleton voted in every election; he took pride in his ability to take on the obligations of a citizen and free man.

Singleton wrote his autobiography, Recollections of My Slavery Days (1922). Most slave narratives were published in the nineteenth century. This work was first published in serial form in the local Peekskill newspaper.

He concluded his account with pride:

Now I feel that I am a part of the country, that I have an interest in its welfare and a responsibility to it. Now I am treated as a man.

Shaped by his military service, Singleton likely joined a chapter of the Grand Army of the Republic (GAR). Officially African Americans were treated equally to white veterans.

He is known to have attended a GAR reunion (known as an encampment) at Gettysburg, Pennsylvania in 1937. National events had been held annually since the late 19th century, but the number of surviving veterans was declining. The last reunion was held in 1949.

In September 1938, Singleton attended another GAR reunion in Des Moines, Iowa, where he marched 15 blocks in the heat with 118 other veterans. He died soon after of a heart attack, at the estimated age of 95.

He was buried in New Haven, where he had been living again. A daughter and grandchildren also lived there. His tombstone reads: "Civil War /Sergeant /Henry Singleton /Co. G. 35th U.S. Col. Inf./ Died Sept. 7, 1938".

== Legacy and honors ==
His memoir was published in 1999 in a scholarly, annotated version edited by David Cecelski and Katherine Mellen Charron. It was issued by the North Carolina Department of Cultural Resources.

A waymarker honoring Singleton has been installed in New Bern by North Carolina Civil War Trails on Queen Street near Johnson Street and St. Peter's Church (formerly an AME Zion Church). Entitled William Henry Singleton/ From Slavery to Freedom, the large plaque includes an extended account of his life.

== Slave narratives and interviews ==
Singleton's autobiography is classified among the genre of slave narratives, which have been integral to historians' understanding of African-American experiences during and after the slavery years. They have been composed mostly by people who escaped from slavery and form an important part of American literature. A few are by people who won freedom suits, in which their slave status was overturned by court decisions.

Such independent histories were supplemented in the 20th century by work of the Federal Writers' Project during the 1930s and the Great Depression. Writers were sent out to interview former enslaved persons in the South to gather their histories. This significant work was published in 1941 as the Slave Narratives: A Folk History of Slavery in the United States from Interviews with Former Slaves. It includes more than 2300 accounts and 500 photos.
