= Lincoln Academy (Kings Mountain, North Carolina) =

Elementary and Secondary School in US

Information
- Established: 1886
- Founder: Miss E. C. Prudden
- Closed: 1955
- Teaching staff: 12
- Gender: Girls (1886-1889); Mixed (1889-1955)
- Enrollment: c.200 (1916)
- Affiliation: American Missionary Association

Lincoln Academy was an elementary school and secondary school, including boarding students, for African-American children in Crowders Mountain, North Carolina, United States. It was founded in 1886 by Miss E. C. Prudden (or Pruden).

In 1888, the American Missionary Association (AMA) of the Congregational Church took over the administration, and the school became co-educational in 1889. It closed in 1955.

== Location ==
Established on 50 acres (20 ha) at All Healing Springs, the school was situated at the foot of Crowders Mountain. It was 4 miles (6 km) southeast of the town of Kings Mountain and 4 miles west of Gastonia, on the national highway between New York City and Atlanta.

== History ==
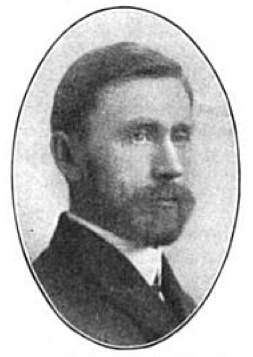
Principal I. Alva Hart

It was first founded in 1886 after the American Civil War as a school for African-American girls by E. C. Pruden, a young woman missionary from Massachusetts. The American Missionary Association took over administration in 1888, after founding and operating numerous schools in the South for freedmen and their children. It operated the school for more than 20 years, with Miss L. S. Cathcart and others as leaders. It admitted boys from 1889, becoming coeducational. In the segregated rural South, there were few schools for African-American children, and Lincoln Academy aspired to give them strong educations.

In the following decade, enrollment increased, a new building was constructed, and dormitories were added. Cathcart Memorial Hall was added in 1900, and additional buildings were constructed over the following 20 years.

In 1916, there were 12 teachers and more than 200 students, 68 of whom were boarding students. The remainder were day students from the region. The academy had 11 buildings. A mothers' meeting was held weekly to discuss issues. Two teachers also conducted reading circles. The pastor of the Lincoln Academy Church influenced instruction.

Principal I. Alva Hart said at the time:

Class room work at Lincoln Academy, no doubt, is like class room work in any other secondary school under the A. M. A. For example in teaching our aim is not to teach subjects alone, but through the subjects to teach the student how to think and what to think. ... Every pupil and every problem that comes up is an original one and the teacher must find an original way to solve it; must define words because the vocabulary is so small; must interpret thought because the comprehension of relation is so meager. Moreover the pupils so lack concentration that to hold their attention is always a problem within itself. Then their 'had wents', 'done gone', 'mountings', 'fountings', 'aim to go', 'figered to do so', 'met up with', the vocabulary of their homes, make the task seem as large as King's Mountain itself. History means little to them because their people have played such a small part in the history we study. But they wake up when the teacher can bring to them an illustration where their people have taken an active and honorable part. It is a great pleasure to see most of them working with a determination to be better prepared for the great struggle of life that is before them.

The state of North Carolina began the process of converting the academy into a public school in 1922. The school added the eighth grade program in 1938–39, and the academy attained accreditation through the North Carolina State Board of Education at that time. In 1943, the AMA tried to increased community involvement in the school. Edgar D. Wilson was appointed as director in the following year. Gaston County took over the school's administration in 1947, but the AMA continued to serve the students who were boarding. When the state and county finally opened new public schools for African-American students in 1955, the academy was closed.

== Notable students ==
- John T. Biggers, muralist who came to prominence toward the end of World War II, founding chairman of art department at Texas Southern University
- Otto Briggs, baseball outfielder in the Negro leagues; played from 1915 to 1934, mostly with the Hilldale Club and the Bacharach Giants
- Ivan Dixon, actor, director, and producer, best known for his role in the 1960s sitcom Hogan's Heroes
- Pearl Anna Neal, music educator, one of the "Five Pearls" or founders of Zeta Phi Beta
- Thelma Adair, educator, church leader, and activist; served as the first Black female moderator of the United Presbyterian Church in the United States of America in 1976.

== See also ==
- Orishatukeh Faduma, former assistant principal

== Bibliography ==
- American Missionary Association (1916). "Lincoln Academy, King's Mountain, North Carolina". The American Missionary. Vol. 70. American Missionary Association.
- American Missionary Association (1918). 72nd Annual Report (Public domain ed.). The Association.
- American Missionary Association (1922). "Chapter, Lincoln Academy, King's Mountain, N. C.". American Missionary Magazine. Vol. 76 (Public domain ed.). American Missionary Association.
- Shaw, Stephanie J. (January 15, 2010). What a Woman Ought to Be and to Do: Black Professional Women Workers during the Jim Crow Era. University of Chicago Press. ISBN 978-0-226-75130-6.
- United States. Office of Education (1917). Bulletin (Public domain ed.). U.S. Government Printing Office.
