= Pearl Anna Neal =

American music educator

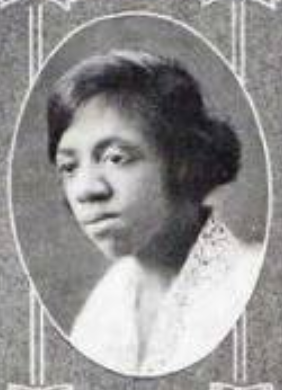
- Pearl Anna Neal, from the 1922 yearbook of Howard University
- Born: October 10, 1900; Charlotte, North Carolina
- Died: January 31, 1978 (aged 77); Charlotte, North Carolina
- Occupation: Music educator
- Known for: One of the founders or "Five Pearls" of Zeta Phi Beta

Pearl Anna Neal (October 10, 1900 – January 31, 1978) was an American music educator and one of the founding members or "Five Pearls" of the sorority Zeta Phi Beta in 1920.

== Early life and education ==
Pearl Anna Neal was born in Charlotte, North Carolina, the daughter of Nora L. Neal (later Nora Caldwell). She attended Lincoln Academy in King's Mountain. She graduated from Howard University's Conservatory of Music in 1922, and pursued further studies at the Juilliard School and the Chicago Institute of Music. She earned a master's degree from Columbia University in 1938. She was one of the founding members or "Five Pearls" of the Zeta Phi Beta sorority in 1920, along with Arizona Cleaver Stemons, Viola Tyler Goings, Myrtle Goings Faithful, and Fannie Pettie Watts.

== Career ==
Neal taught in Georgia and Texas as a young woman, and taught music in the Winston-Salem public schools. She was also director of the senior music majors at the teachers' college in Winston-Salem. She was also president of the Zeta Phi Beta chapter in Winston-Salem, and was active in sorority activities throughout her life.

Neal was also a church organist and choir director, at Gethsemane AME Zion Church in Charlotte. She was named Gethsemane's "Woman of the Year" in 1974.

== Personal life ==
Neal had a stroke at work in 1960, and required months of hospitalization and rehabilitation to play piano again. She retired from teaching in 1966, and she died in 1978, in Charlotte, at the age of 77. She and the other Five Pearls are honored annually by Zeta Phi Beta chapters at their "Founders' Day" programs. The Winston-Salem branch of Zeta Phi Beta sponsors a Pearl Anna Neal Scholarship, for "minority female high school seniors who participate in the performing arts and are North Carolina residents in Mecklenburg County".
