= William Singleton =

William Singleton may refer to:

- William Singleton (politician) (died 1677), English politician
- William Dean Singleton, American newspaper executive
- William Henry Singleton, American slave, Union soldier and minister

== See also ==
- Billy Singleton, American basketball player
