= Horace James (minister) =

American minister and Union Army chaplain

Horace James (May 6, 1818 – June 9, 1875) was a minister who served as a chaplain in the Union Army during the American Civil War. He served in the 25th Massachusetts Volunteer Infantry Regiment and was tasked with assisting freedmen in North Carolina in 1863.

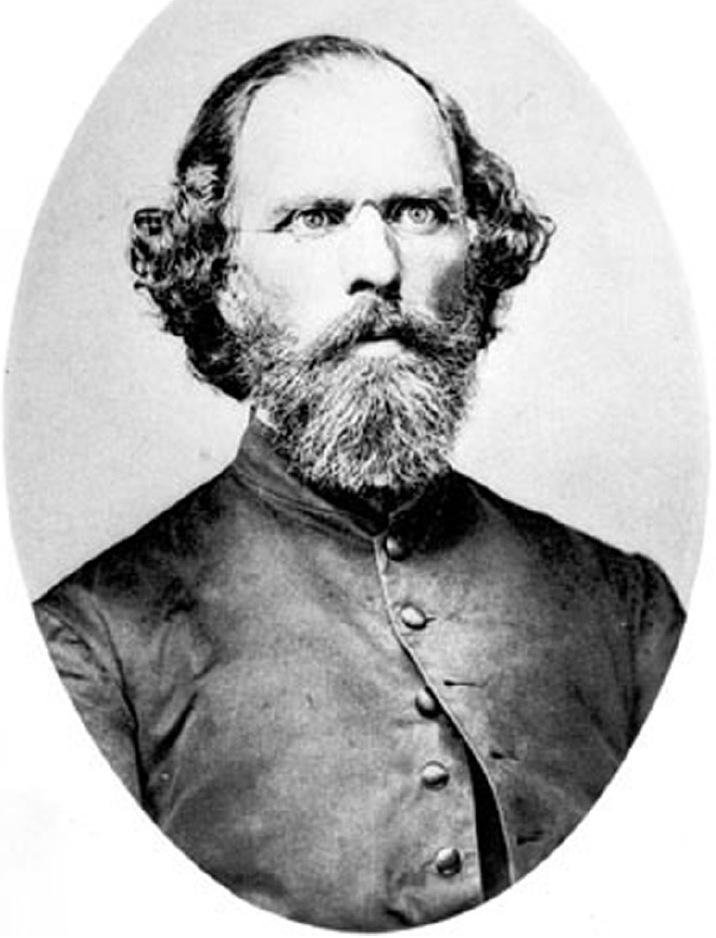
Portrait of James

James was born in Medford, Massachusetts, to Galen C. James and Mary R. Turner, who was from Scituate, Massachusetts. James graduated from Yale University in 1840.

After President Abraham Lincoln issued the Emancipation Proclamation freeing all slaves in rebel territory in April 1863, John G. Foster appointed James, an experienced Congregational chaplain, as "Superintendent of Negro Affairs for the North Carolina District" to support the transition to freedom for former slaves. He was to develop a colony from the contraband (escaped slaves) camp that had developed on Roanoke Island. It became known as the Roanoke Island Freedmen's Colony and was active from 1863 until 1867. James also managed other camps for freedmen in the state, such as one at Trent River near his base at New Bern. Foster directed James to settle the people, give them farming tools, and prepare them for a "free and independent community." He issued a report on his department's activities in 1864. Some of his letters, orations, and sermons were published. including one he gave July 4, 1862 to the Twenty-fifth Regiment Massachusetts Volunteers at Newbern, North Carolina. Some of his letters were to his father's newspaper The Congregationalist.

He was photographed with a bushy mustache and beard. James City, North Carolina, established as a colony of freedmen, was named for him.

== Personal life ==
James married Helen Leavitt in Medford in 1843 and they moved to Wrentham, Massachusetts where he served as pastor of the Wrentham Original Congregational Church. They had one son, Horace Melville James (born March 28, 1846).
