= Viola Tyler Goings =

American community leader

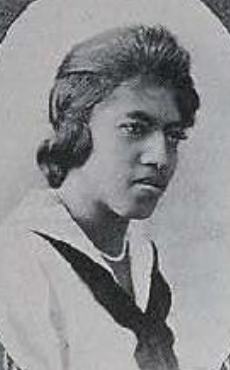
- Viola Tyler (later Goings), from the 1920 yearbook of Howard University
- Born: Viola Margaret Tyler; August 29, 1899; Ohio
- Died: March 9, 1983; Ohio
- Occupation: Educator
- Known for: One of the five founders of Zeta Phi Beta in 1920

Viola Margaret Tyler Goings (August 29, 1899 – March 9, 1983) was an American educator, and one of the "Five Pearls", the five founding members of the Black sorority Zeta Phi Beta in 1920.

== Early life and education ==
Viola Margaret Tyler was born on a farm near Flushing, Ohio, the daughter of Richard Lewis Tyler and Evaline (Lina) Munts Tyler. She graduated from Howard University in 1920. In 1920, she was one of the five founding members of Zeta Phi Beta, known as the "Five Pearls", along with her sister, Myrtle Tyler Faithful, Arizona Cleaver Stemons, Pearl Anna Neal, and Fannie Pettie Watts.

== Career ==
Goings was a mathematics teacher in Springfield, Ohio, and in Smithfield, North Carolina. She was also a school principal in Maryland. Goings and her sister appeared and spoke at national Zeta Phi Beta events into their seventies.

== Personal life and legacy ==
Viola Tyler married Frederick Douglass Goings in 1922. They had two sons and two daughters. Her husband died in 1973, and she died in 1983, in Springfield, at the age of 83. In 2018, she and her sister were honored with a historical marker called the Tyler Sisters Memorial, at Perrin Woods Park in Springfield. Her daughter Wynona was inducted into Zeta Phi Beta in 2019, at the age of 95, to mark the sorority's 99th anniversary. The "Five Pearls" are celebrated every year by hundreds of Zeta Phi Beta chapters across North America.
