= Peabody Academy (Troy, North Carolina) =

Coordinates: 35.3552°N 79.8942°W

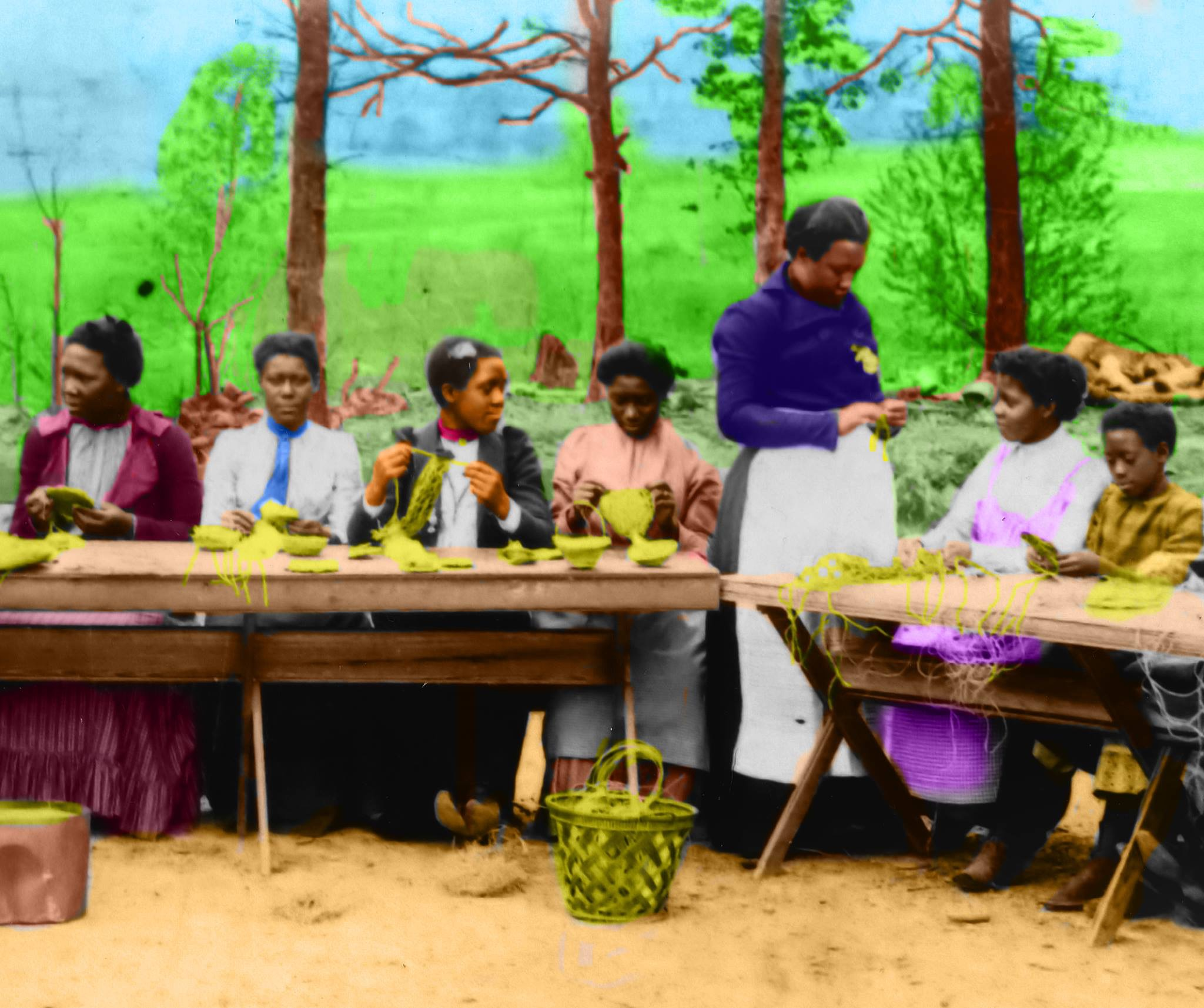
A basketry class at the Peabody Academy, c. 1910

Peabody Academy was established in 1880 in Troy, North Carolina, by the American Missionary Association (AMA) for the sole purpose of educating African Americans of Montgomery County, North Carolina. The Negro boarding school attracted students from all of the surrounding rural areas including towns now known as Biscoe, Mount Gilead, Candor, Pekin, Star, in addition to Troy, North Carolina. Peabody Academy was the only institution, at the time, that served the educational needs of African Americans.

After U.S. Congress passed the Civil Rights Act of 1964, Montgomery County Public School System began the process of integrating its schools under the threat of cutting off federal funds if they did not comply. Almost fourteen years after the Brown v. Board decision and nearly four years after the Civil Rights Act was signed into law, the Montgomery County School Board voted to close Peabody School on March 28, 1968. The Peabody Academy was then repurposed and reopened as an integrated Troy Middle School. Today, the buildings are occupied by the Troy Housing Authority with a few rooms on the bottom floor repurposed as the Peabody Museum.

== History ==
=== Founding board of trustees ===
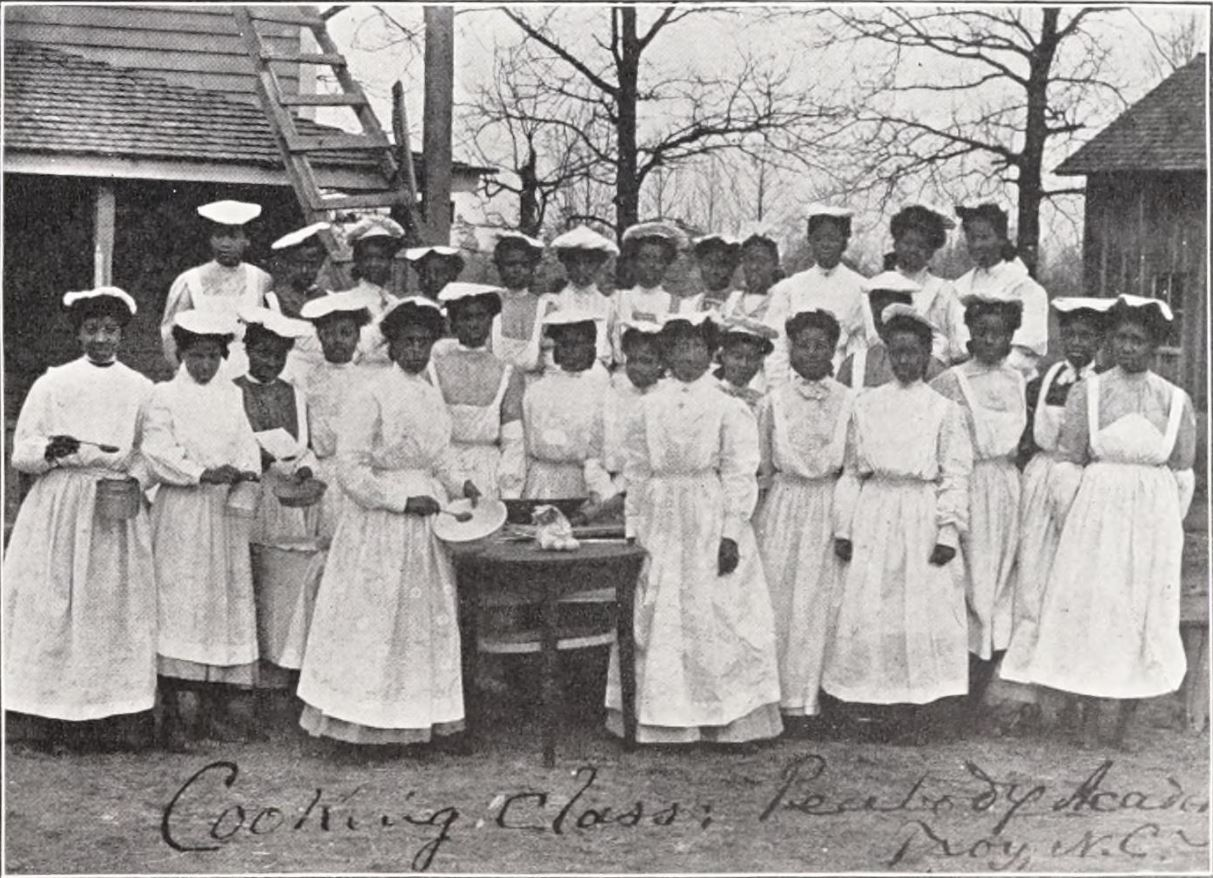
A cooking class at the school, c. 1910

Since Troy had the largest population of African Americans in Montgomery County and surrounding area, Reverend Ellis and the AMA chose the small town as the location to establish a school for freedman. Peter Green, Alexander C. Powell, and James Kron formed the original Board of Trustees for Peabody Academy. All three were former slaves and leaders in their respective communities. Mr. Green represented the Cheek Creek Township, which is the modern-day Mount Gilead/Pekin area in south-central Montgomery County. Mr. Powell represented the Rocky Springs Township, which is in between Candor and Norman area in the southeastern Montgomery County and northern Richmond County. Mr. Kron represented the Uwharrie Township, which is west of Troy in western Montgomery County. Mr. Green, born in 1810, was the elder of the three men and served as chairman. In 1878, W. H. Watkins of Troy deeded a tract of land to the Trustees of Peabody Academy for "the purpose of erecting an academy for Negroes on the road leading south from Troy".

=== Predecessor to Peabody Academy ===
Before Peabody was established, the Freeman's Bureau established a school in Troy as part of its mission to educate African Americans across the South and former-slave states after the Civil War. In 1866–1867, General Daniel Sickles commanded the Department of the South in District 2, or the Carolinas, and had Negro schools established. The Freeman Bureau worked with Lockey Simmons, local plantation owner of 40 slaves, to establish and help fund a Negro school in Troy, called Simmon's Tan Yard. Louiza, a former slave, was his assistant. Upon his departure from Troy and death in 1880, the American Missionary Association took over the work of educating the Negro students of Troy and Montgomery County.

=== Naming of Peabody Academy ===
Although it can't be confirmed at this point, it is likely that the Peabody Academy was named after George Peabody, a prominent American international investor. George Peabody is considered to be the father of modern philanthropy. His aims were to improve society, promote education, and provide the poor with the means to help themselves, including African Americans in the South. He established the Peabody Education Fund in 1867 with $2,000,000 in funding. The fund was instrumental in the construction, endowments, scholarships, teacher and industrial education for newly freed American slaves.

It is considered by scholars to be one of the first truly modern philanthropies because of the way it went about giving its capital. The Peabody trustees devised a system of self-help by which the Foundation would provide challenge grants to local communities and the assistance was strategically targeted. Thus, the relatively meager return on the Fund's principal could be leveraged. The Fund would sought out locations where there were sufficient numbers of students and cooperative public officials who would combine the relatively small grant, tax money, or community support to build schools.

By the second decade of the Twentieth Century a large number of southern communities had been able to build schools because of efforts by the Peabody Fund joined by others such as the Slater Fund, the Jeanes Fund and the giant General Education Board, established by John D. Rockefeller.

=== Douglas Hall ===
In 1913 under the leadership of Principal and Reverend Sims, a successful fundraising campaign would help collect approximately $6,000 for the erection of a brick building to serve as the main building of Peabody Academy. The building would be called Douglas Hall. These funds would also be dedicated to constructing a new boy's dormitory to be named Anderson Hall. However, WWI would put a halt to Rev Sim's ambitious plan.

By 1920, Douglas Hall was near completion and a magnificent structure it was. Peabody students, staff, and carpenters sent by the AMA joined to construct the school's main building. It was a cathedral-like building, composed of brick, with a wall of windows over 25-feet high surrounding the large front double doors. It was modern in every respect, including indoor plumbing and electric lighting. Classrooms were on the first and second floor. The main feature of the first floor was the beautiful chapel and auditorium. The basement housed the school cafeteria and science laboratories.

Douglas Hall was destroyed by fire in 1946. The current standing Main Hall for Peabody Academy was built on the same foundation of Douglas Hall.

== The American Missionary Association ==
The American Missionary Association (AMA) was a nondenominational abolitionist society dedicated to providing education and political rights to African Americans. The AMA was founded in Syracuse, New York, in 1846 through the merger of a group of abolitionists who supported the uprising of slaves on the Amistad in 1839 with several small missionary organizations. Though the AMA's constitution stated that spreading the Christian gospel to America and other nations was the primary goal of the association, it quickly began to center its activities around anti-slavery missions. As slaves were freed during the Civil War, the AMA altered its mission to making provisions for them. More than 500 churches and schools were set up by the AMA to help acculturate the newly freed slaves. The (AMA) sent Reverend William Ellis to Troy, North Carolina, to build a Congregational church and school.

=== Reverend Orishatukeh Faduma Tenure ===
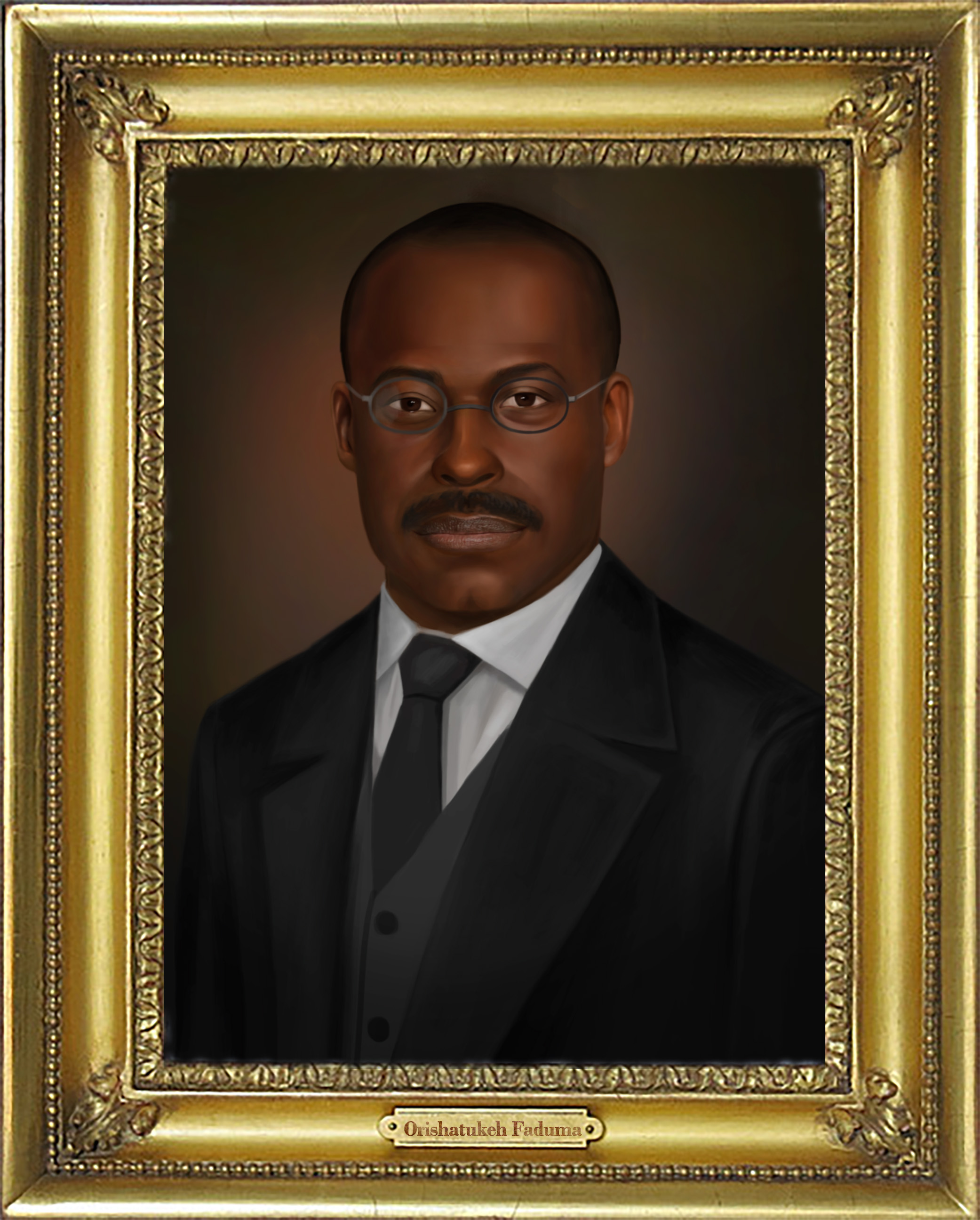
Orishatukeh Faduma

After the death of Rev. Ellis, Reverend Orishatukeh Faduma, a native African and graduate of London University and Yale, led the school for 17 years starting in 1895. Rev. Faduma was a fine man of moral character and integrity, born in Sierra-Leon. Rev. Faduma graduated from Methodist High School, studied at Queens College in Taunton and London University. He received a Bachelor of Arts In 1885, the first man from Sierra-Leon to do so. He continued his education at Yale University Divinity School, receiving the Bachelor of Divinity in 1895. Peabody excelled academically under the leadership of Fuduma. The curriculum in those days included courses in the Theology, Masonry, Early Childhood Development, Finance & Economics, Mathematics, Science, and English.

Rev. Faduma not only served as principal of Peabody Academy but he was also pastor of the Congregational Church of Troy.

Rev. Faduma was an avid support of W.E.B. Dubois and served as a member of the American Negro Academy (ANA), founded in Washington, D.C., in 1897 by Dubois, Paul Laurence Dunbar, Blanche K. Bruce and many other prominent members. It was the first organization in the United States to support African-American academic scholarship. DuBois suggested that a Talented Tenth of African Americans, primarily composed of blacks trained in classical higher education, could lead in educating masses of black citizens. He knew that most of the latter, who still lived in the rural South, would likely work in rural or unskilled jobs. But he wanted to provide opportunities for blacks who could surpass those limits. Rev. Faduma was in prime position to carry forward the mission of the organization being that he served as principal of Peabody Academy, a rural school with a focus on teaching Negro children a trade.

== Notable alumni ==
=== Julius L. Chambers ===
Julius Chambers was the third Director-Counsel of the NAACP Legal Defense and Educational Fund, Inc., serving from 1984 to 1993. Chambers was born and raised in Mount Gilead, North Carolina. He remembered when his father, an auto mechanic, had a white customer who refused to pay for repairs, and none of the white lawyers in the town would take his case. The experience led Chambers to want to become a lawyer. He would go on to become one of this country's great civil rights lawyers and leaders, devoting his entire adult life to justice and civil rights law.

Chambers' dedication to equality and justice was shaped by his formative experiences as a boy in segregated North Carolina, in particular by the experiences of his father with discrimination. As a result, he held a firm belief that education was paramount to changing the trajectory of his future. He attended and graduated from Peabody Academy High School in Troy, North Carolina. After high school, he attended North Carolina Central University where he earned summa cum laude honors. Chambers went on to earn a master's degree from the University of Michigan and then enrolled as one of the first African American students at the University of North Carolina School of Law. He was a brilliant law student at UNC School of Law, where he not only graduated with high honors but also graduated first in his class. He was pioneer in many areas including the first African-American editor-in-chief of The North Carolina Law Review, a student-operated law journal at UNC School of Law. While teaching at Columbia Law School, he obtained a Master of Laws degree.

His reputation first caught the attention of then-Legal Defense Fund Director-Counsel, Thurgood Marshall. Chambers was one of the first two LDF scholarship recipients. He also was LDF's first Legal Fellow. This began his lifelong association with the NAACP Legal Defense Fund, where he worked as an intern and lawyer, cooperating attorney, board member and board chair, and, finally, as Director-Counsel, a position he held from 1984 to 1993. In 1993, Chambers left NAACP LDF to become Chancellor at North Carolina Central University, his college alma mater. He remained chancellor at North Carolina Central until he retired in 2001, when he rejoined the firm of Ferguson, Stein & Chambers.

Chambers was a founding member of Ferguson, Stein & Chambers, the first integrated law firm in North Carolina. The firm became a model for civil rights law firm practice in the private bar. Over his years in practice at the firm, and later at NAACP LDF, Chambers litigated and argued landmark civil rights cases in the United States Supreme Court, including Swann v. Charlotte-Mecklenberg Board of Education, 402 U.S. 1 (1971) (school desegregation), Thornburg v. Gingles, 478 U.S. 30 (1986) (voting rights), Griggs v. Duke Power Co., 401 U.S. 424 (1971) and Albemarle Paper Co. v. Moody, 422 U.S. 405 (1975) (employment discrimination), Shaw v. Hunt, 517 U.S. 899 (1996) (redistricting), among many others.

Chambers was known for his sharp mind, his relentless focus on the law as a means of advancing civil rights, his understated sense of humor, and his unflappable demeanor. He was a man of tremendous courage. His home and his car were firebombed on separate occasions in 1965, and his office was burned to the ground in 1971, during the height of some of his most contentious civil rights litigation in North Carolina. When he spoke of these events, Chambers was typically matter-of-fact, insisting always that you “just keep fighting.”

Chambers worked alongside other litigators and racial justice advocates — Thurgood Marshall, Jack Greenberg, Constance Baker Motley, Robert Carter — and he formed the connective tissue with the next generation of civil rights lawyers — many of whom he personally hired at LDF.

Julius Chambers died in 2013 at the age of 76. He was survived by two children and three grandchildren.

=== Eddie Coleman, Sr. ===
Eddie Brice Coleman, Sr. (widower of Mrs. Maudestine Clinkscales Coleman), son of the late Preston and Charlotte Simms Coleman, was born on September 28, 1918, in Chester, South Carolina. He was the fourth of 11 children. Mr. Coleman was married to his wife in 1943 and they were happily married for 55 years until she passed in 1998. He attended Peabody Academy in Troy, North Carolina, and later graduated from North Carolina A&T State University after spending 4 years in the Army. He received his bachelor's degree in agriculture and a master's degree in school administration. He was a remarkable educator and imparted knowledge and motivation to all he met. He began his education administration work for Peabody School in Troy in 1947. At the close of Peabody School, he began teaching for West Montgomery High School.

=== Almetta Armstrong ===
Almetta Armstrong is a Candor native who graduated from Peabody Academy High School. She earned a Bachelor of Science in elementary education from Shaw University and a Master of Science in elementary education from North Carolina A&T State University.

Armstrong retired as an educator that taught for 33 years, 19 of those serving children in Montgomery County Schools. During her educational career, she served as the Montgomery County NCAE President and District NCAE President. Mrs. Armstrong also served on the Montgomery County Board of Education for 19 years. In addition to local leadership roles, Mrs. Armstrong served as a board member on the North Carolina School Boards Association and served as the board president. She served as an education advisor to Governor Jim Hunt and State Superintendent Bob Etheridge.

=== Lieutenant Colonel Earl Durant ===
Early Durant was born March 4, 1947, in Asheboro, North Carolina, and graduated from Peabody Academy High School in 1964. He enrolled at North Carolina Central University and graduated in 1968 with a Bachelor of Science degree in health education. Durant was commissioned at Officer Training School (Lackland Air Force Base, Texas) in May 1969. In 1970, Colonel Durant was assigned as a deputy missile combat crew member and in 1972, he graduated from Squadron Officer School at Maxwell Air Force Base, Alabama. He would later complete Air Command and Staff College by correspondence in 1974. His various service in the United States Air Force included space surveillance monitor, surveillance officer, and space & missile warning staff officer.

From 1979 to 1981, Colonel Durant became director of the Space and Missile Warning Systems. He was also a staff officer assigned to the Deputy Chief of Staff, Space and Missile Warning Systems Headquarters, Strategic Air Command, Offutt Air Force Base, Nebraska.

Colonel Durant's military decorations include the Meritorious Service Medal with two oak leaf clusters, Joint Service Commendation Medal, and the Air Force Commendation Medal.

== Film footage of students ==
As part of H. Lee Waters' "Movies of Local People" on 16mm black and white reversal film, Peabody Academy and its some of its students appear in one of the clips. A collection of Waters' films includes silent footage that he captured when he visited Montgomery County in 1938. Footage included not only footage of Peabody School, but also black and white film of the local townspeople, theater performances, downtown shops, and schools in the surrounding small towns of Troy, Biscoe, Star, and Candor. Waters' collection is digitized and housed at the Rubenstein Rare Book & Manuscript Library at Duke University and the Duke Digital Collections.

Peabody Academy Marching Band performed in several Christmas Parades in Star, North Carolina. Footage of the December 14, 1957, Star Christmas Parade Star includes a ten-second appearance by the Peabody's marching band. Original SD footage recorded on Super 8 color film, courtesy of Star Halcyon Woman's Club and is available online via Star Heritage Series YouTube channel.

== 1950 Yearbook ==
There was only one yearbook ever designed and published for Peabody High School. It was edited and published by the Senior Class of 1950. The yearbook can be found on Flickr.com showing various photos of the student body, staff, football team, basketball team, band, science club, etc.

== Peabody Community vs Montgomery County Board of Education ==
In 1954, the Supreme Court unanimously struck down segregation in American public schools, in the case that came to be known as Brown v. Board of Education. This was a landmark decision that would be the catalyst for Civil Rights Movement. However, the Montgomery County Board of Education and School Superintendent, like most of the school systems across the South, were very slow and resistant to implementing the process of desegregation of the schools. This sparked the Peabody Community to organize, strategize, and take action. In 1954, a group of 45 Montgomery County parents led by the NAACP decided that they would file a formal complaint against the school system seeking admission of their African American students to the white schools. They were requesting immediate desegregation of the county schools in accordance with the recent Brown v. Board decision of the United States Supreme Court. The Peabody Community residents went before the Montgomery County Board of Commissioners on September 7, 1954, with a petition for the desegregation of Montgomery County Schools. Eventually, 27 parents signed the petition which was delivered by J. Kenneth Lee and George A. Lawson, the attorneys for the petitioners. The summons was issued July 29, 1955.

The petitioners were A. E. Thomas, Purty Thomas, Ada Butler, Hattie Stanback, Erie Green, Sam Butler, James Smith, Jessie N. Marshall, Henry Baldwin, Rushie McAuley, Trumella A. Diggs, A. D. Freeman, J. W. French, Oscar Thomas, Gladys K. Thomas, Sydney Thomas, R. D. Gainey, Bertie N. Hammond, Jass Cagle, Irene Martin, Daisy Harris, James Butler, N. W. Lowery, Flora Kelly Simmons, T. H. Simmons, Ernest Simmons, and George Simmons, President of the Peabody High School Parent-Teacher Association (P.T.A.).

The case was HELEN COVINGTON et al. v. MONTGOMERY COUNTY SCHOOL BOARD. | No. 323-R. | United States District Court M. D. North Carolina | April 7, 1956.

The parents named the defendants as J. S. Edwards, Superintendent of Schools of Montgomery County, and members of the Montgomery County Board of Education: E.R. Wallace, D.C. Ewing, Harold A. Scott, James R. Burt and James Ingram.

The class action lawsuit read:

The parents of a number of Negro children in Montgomery County, North Carolina, brought this suit to secure an injunction against the Superintendent of Schools and the County Board of Education, directing the defendants to present a plan of desegregation of the races in the schools and forbidding them to assign Negroes to particular schools because of their race. The complaint was filed on July 29, 1955, as a class action by thirteen adults personally and as the next friends of the forty-five minor plaintiffs, all of whom are Negroes. The defendants filed an answer on September 22, 1955, alleging that the plaintiffs had failed to exhaust the administrative remedies provided by the State, in that they did not comply with the statutes of the State which regulate the assignment and enrollment of pupils in the public schools. On this account, the defendants moved the court to dismiss the suit, and the District Judge after hearing granted the motion.

By 1959, the case had made its way up to the U.S. Supreme Court (SCOTUS). It was argued on March 12, 1959, and the SCOTUS made its decision on March 19, 1959. The SCOTUS upheld the lower courts decision in rejecting the parents appeal to admit their children into the white schools. Many of the black parents involved in the lawsuits suffered retribution for their courage and conviction. Several of them received death threats, were fired from their jobs, and blackballed from getting future employment. Although their case was rejected, the effort was not a total failure. It was an unprecedented demonstration by the Peabody Community to Troy, Montgomery County, and the rest of North Carolina that the small community would no longer tolerate desegregation and demanded what was now their constitutional right. These brave parents of the Peabody Community mobilized and showed solidarity in their fight to provide their young African American children with the same facilities, trained teachers, books, pencils, and resources that was provided to white children.

== Closing of Peabody Academy ==
It wasn't until U.S. Congress passed the Civil Rights Act of 1964 that Montgomery County Public School System started to make a serious attempt to integrate its public schools. This was only because the federal government threatened to cut off all federal funds for any school system that did not comply with an integrated school system. Unable to operate without the $64,500 that the school system received annually in the form of federal aid, Superintendent C. Wade Mobley recommended a compromise called "Freedom of Choice", in which parents and students were given a choice of attending any school of choice, regardless of race or town. Only a handful of black students chose to attend the historically white schools, but there was not one single white student who opted into an all-black school.

Then in March 1968, the U.S. Department of Health Education and Welfare (US HEW) informed school officials that they had to eliminate the dual school structure by the 1969–70 school year. On March 28, 1968, the Montgomery County School Board voted to close Peabody School and send the elementary students from Peabody to Troy Elementary School. High school-aged students from Peabody would have to enroll at either East or West Montgomery High School, depending on the district where they lived. The Peabody Academy was then repurposed and reopened as an integrated Troy Middle School.

All elementary students in the Star district were assigned to Star Elementary, and Biscoe students were assigned to Biscoe Elementary. First and second graders from all-black Highland School were assigned to Mt. Gilead Elementary, and first and second graders from Brutonville went to Candor Elementary.

The plan did not comply with federal guidelines, however, because Highland School and Brutonville School remained open as all-black schools. A team from US HEW arrived in February 1969 to see why the county hadn't made more progress and termed the school board's plan "unacceptable."

== Paradigm of Hope: The Story of the Peabody Academy ==
In 2016, John Maynard, in conjunction with Star Heritage Association, published a book entitled Paradigm of Hope, that focuses on the role that the American Missionary Association and Principal Orishatukeh Faduma played in establishing one of the early schools for Negroes in Montgomery County, North Carolina. It also discusses Faduma's background and his involvements as an educator, minister, and activist. Maynard provides a portrayal of the African American community in the area and its relationship with the larger community. Maynard collaborated with Star Heritage Association in writing and publishing the 210-page book. Maynard was motivated to write the book because "prior historians have put the stories of our African American ancestors on the back-burner".

== Peabody Community Development, Inc ==
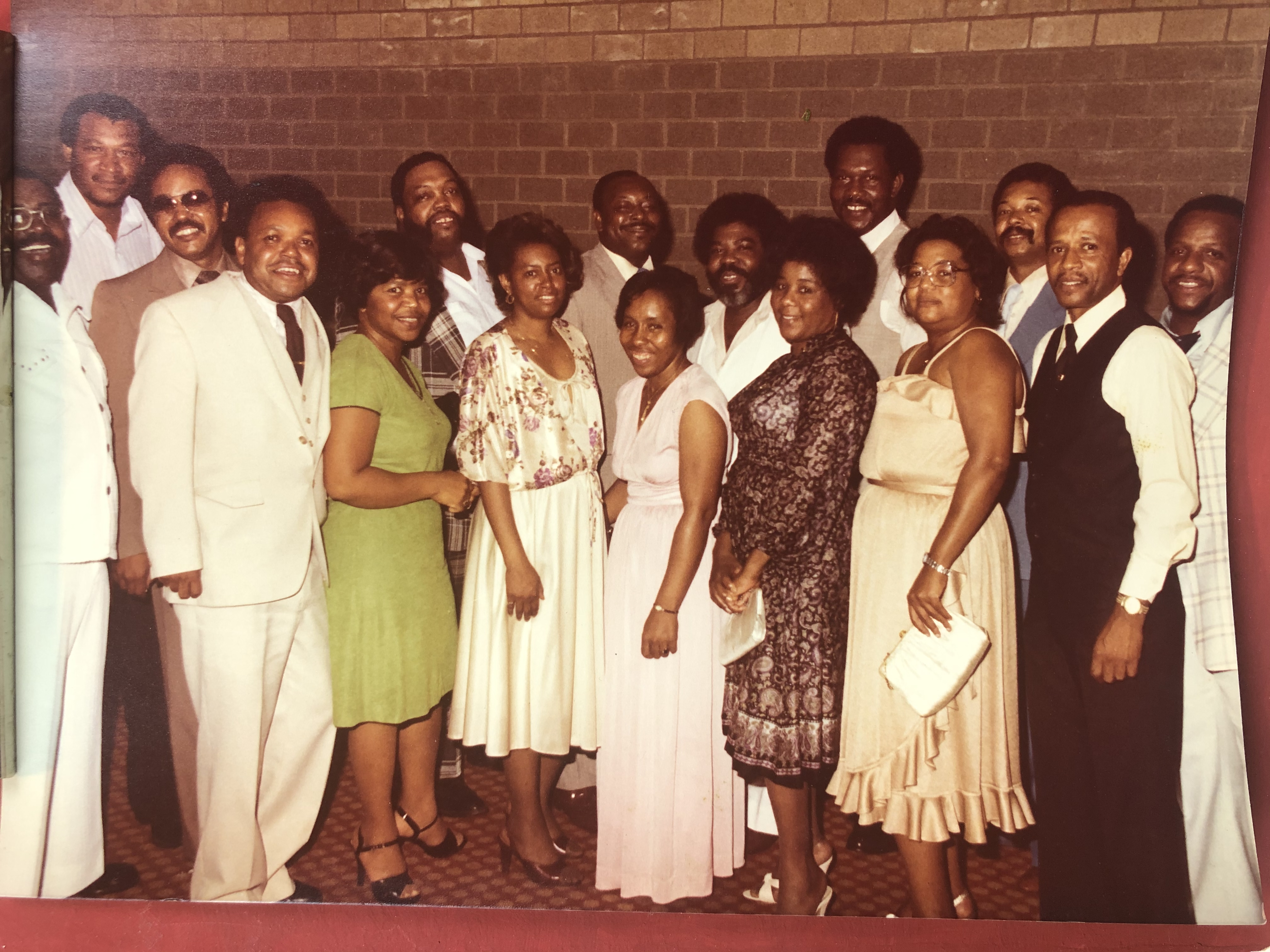
Class reunion (c. 1980)

Alumni and former students of Peabody High School formed and incorporated an organization to encourage alumni to participate actively in the Troy community and Montgomery County alike. It also promotes its members to attend events, to volunteer, to create new ways for alumni to stay connected to each other, and to contribute to the greatness of North Carolina.

Today, ownership of the administration building, gym, outside basketball court, and property of Peabody School have been transferred over to Troy Housing Authority. A portion of the basement of the Peabody administration building is reserved for Peabody Community Development and now serves as Peabody Museum. The Museum is open for a limited time on Saturdays and PDC Members hold meetings here once a month.

The organization approved a partnership with the Peabody Legacy Project to preserve and highlight the legacy of Peabody Academy, Peabody High School, and Peabody Alumni. The project's secondary mission is to establish a digital footprint for the Peabody Academy/High School through a docuseries, interviews, online postings, videos, and use of social media.
