= Orishatukeh Faduma =

Christian missionary and educator (1855–1946 AD)

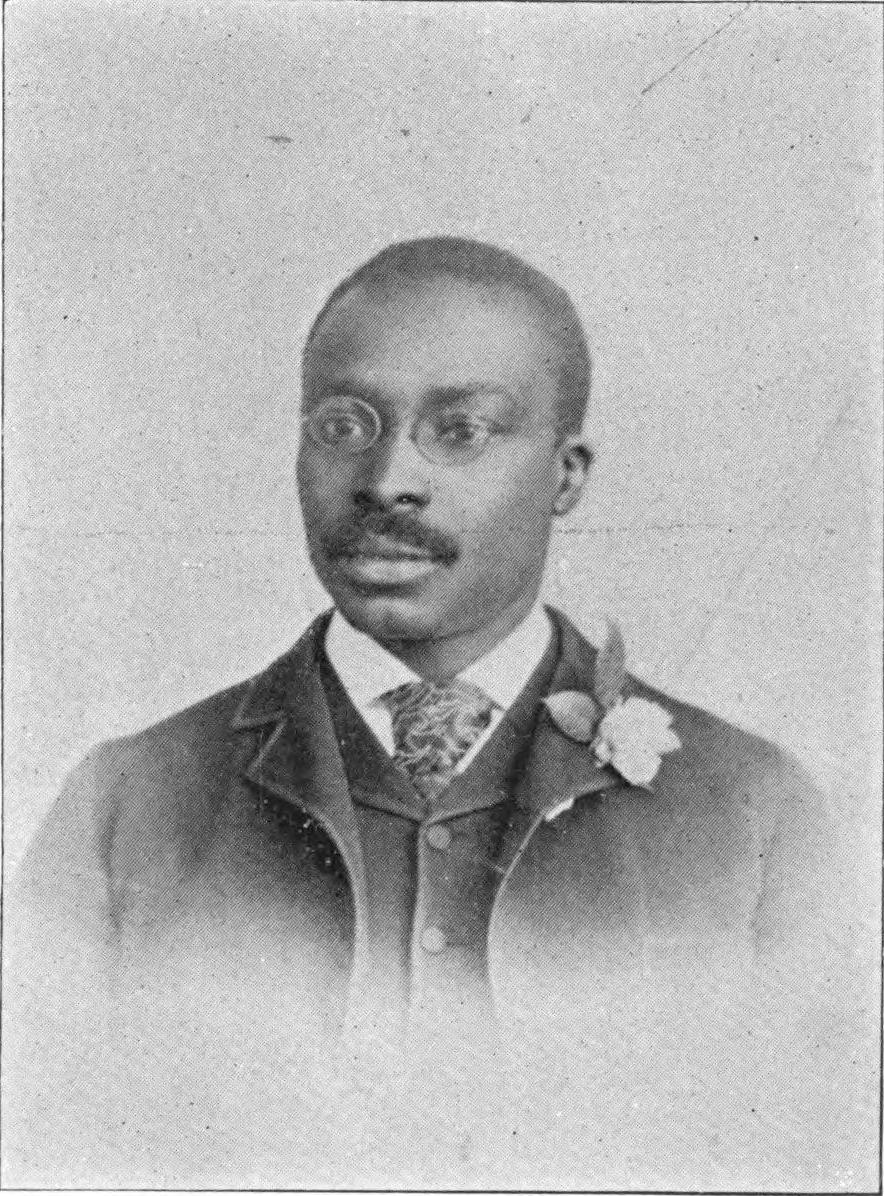
- Born: September 15, 1855; British Guiana (now Guyana)
- Died: January 25, 1946 (aged 90); High Point, North Carolina, United States
- Other name: Williams James Davies
- Education: Wesleyan Boys High School; Methodist Boys High School; Yale University; University of London
- Occupations: missionary educator
- Known for: being the First African student of Yale Divinity School; First West African student of the University of London; Educator in the United States and Christian Missionary work in Sierra Leone
- Spouse: Henrietta Adams (m. 1895)
- Children: Omojowu Faduma; Du Bois Faduma

Orishatukeh Faduma (September 15, 1855 – January 25, 1946) was a British Guiana-born Nigerian-American Christian missionary and educator, who was also an advocate for African culture. He contributed to laying the foundation for the future development of African studies.

== Early life ==
Faduma was born to John and Omolofi Faduma in British Guiana (now Guyana), both repatriated Yoruba recaptives. His parents were on the verge of being sold as slaves to the United States when the British navy recaptured them in the Atlantic Ocean. His family moved to Sierra Leone when he was seven years old. He was soon baptized thereafter and given the Christian name "William James Davis" by which he was known until 1887 when he changed it to his native Yoruba name "Orishatukeh Faduma".

== Education and career ==
Faduma attended Wesleyan boys high school. He lived with the principal of the school, reverend Claudius May (1845-1902) who inspired his lifelong interest in education and teaching. After graduating, Faduma continued to work at the school as an assistant teacher. Faduma attended the Christian schools at the time; Methodist Boys High School. Faduma travelled to England for further studies and was the first West African student to earn a B.A. from the University of London in 1884. After studying in England, Faduma returned to Sierra Leone to teach for some time. From 1885 till 1891, he was senior master at the Methodist Boys High School. It was during this period in 1887 that he formed an association called Dress Reform society with other members of the Freetown community including Dr. Edward Blyden and A. E. Tobuku-Metzger. The society was aimed to foster the wearing of African robes in lieu of the Victorian coat imposed by westerners and creoles.

In 1891, he returned to the United States to further his education as one of the few African to do so. He was the first African student to enrol at Yale Divinity School after obtaining a scholarship of $400 at the time to study philosophy and religion. He earned a bachelor's degree at Yale University. In 1894, he continued his postgraduate studies at Yale Divinity School until his graduation in 1895. He lived in the United States thereafter and became a naturalized U.S. Citizen in 1902. From 1891 to 1895, he was affiliated with the American Missionary Association. He was also affiliated with the African Methodist Episcopal Church as a minister. From 1895 till 1914, he was appointed as principal and pastor-in charge of Peabody Academy, Troy, North Carolina which was established in 1880 for the education of African Americans. In 1892, Faduma served on the Advisory Council on African Ethnology at the World's Exposition in Chicago. In 1894 he was a Yale delegate to the Inter-Seminary Missionary Alliance meeting held in Rochester, New York where he delivered a paper on "Industrial Missions in Africa." In 1895, he attended a missionary congress in Atlanta, Georgia, where he presented two papers, one on Yoruba religion and the other on missionary work in Africa, about the same period of the Cotton States Exposition in Atlanta, where Booker T. Washington, the main spokesman for black Americans at that time, made his landmark "Atlanta Compromise" speech. Faduma became a member of the New York–based American Negro Academy, a forum established in 1904 by prominent African-American intellectuals to voice their opinions regarding the welfare of blacks. Faduma was the only African to address the Academy, with his subject titled "The Defects of the Negro Church."

After returning to Sierra Leone in 1918, he was appointed as principal of the United Methodist Collegiate School from 1916 to 1918. From 1918 till 1923, he was inspector, instructor and officer-in-charge of the model school.

In 1924, Faduma returned to the United States and remained teaching until 1939. He was assistant principal and instructor in Latin, ancient and modern history and English Literature at Lincoln Academy, Kings Mountain. He made it compulsory for women to acquire sewing and culinary skills prior to graduation. Afterwards, Peabody and Lincoln ceased to function. In 1923, Faduma was also assigned to teach at the Virginia Theological Seminary and College, Lynchburg.

== Personal life ==
In September 1895, he married one of the teachers at the Peabody Academy, Henrietta Adams. They had two children named Omojowu, born in 1902, and Du Bois, born in 1922, who was most likely named after the American scholar and civil rights activist, W. E. B. Du Bois.

Faduma died in 1946 and was buried in High Point, North Carolina.

== Bibliography ==
- Faduma, Orishatukeh, -1946: The defects of the Negro church / (Washington, D.C. : American Negro Academy, 1904) (page images at HathiTrust).
- Moses Nathaniel Moore (1986). Orishatukeh Faduma: Liberal Theology and Evangelical Pan-Africanism, 1857-1946. Rowman & Littlefield Publishers, Inc. ISBN 978-0810830912.
- Wilson Jeremiah Moses (1996). Classical Black Nationalism: From the American Revolution to Marcus Garvey. NYU Press. p. 31. ISBN 978-0-814-7552-42.
