= List of Zeta Phi Beta grand boulés =

Zeta Phi Beta is an International collegiate sorority that is historically African American. It was established in 1920 at Howard University. The sorority held its first convention or Grand Boulé in 1920, jointly with Phi Beta Sigma. Following is a list of Zeta Phi Beta Grand Boulés.

Convention	Dates	Location	References
1st	December 26, 1920 – December 28, 1920	Washington, D.C.	(Note: This was the first joint Conclave/Boulé with Phi Beta Sigma.)
	1929		
	December 1930 or January 1931	Raleigh, North Carolina	
	1933	New York City, New York	
15th	December 27, 1935 – December 30, 1935	Howard University; Washington, D.C.	(Note: The National Recreation Project was inaugurated at this meeting.)
	December 1936 – December 31, 1936	New York City, New York	(Note: This was the 2nd joint Boulé/Conclave with Phi Beta Sigma.)
	December 27, 1937 – December 30, 1937	Houston, Texas	
	December 27, 1938 – December 30, 1938	Atlanta, Georgia	
20th	December 1939 or January 1940	Baltimore, Maryland	
21st	December 27, 1940 – December 30, 1940	Richmond, Virginia	
		Tulsa, Oklahoma	(Note: This meeting was scheduled for December 27 to 30, 1942 but was canceled due to World War II.)
	December 27, 1945 – December 31, 1945	St. Louis, Missouri	(Note: This was a joint Conclave/Boulé with Phi Beta Sigma.)
26th	August 12, 1947 – August 17, 1947	Los Angeles, California	
	December 27, 1948 – December 31, 1948	Philadelphia, Pennsylvania	(Note: Zeta Amicae was founded at this meeting.)
30th	December 27, 1950 – December 30, 1950	New Orleans, Louisiana	(Note: Zeta Archonettes was founded at this meeting.)
	December 1954	Louisville, Kentucky	(Note: At this meeting, Louisville newswoman Dorcas Ruthenberger was elected as sorority's first white honorary member.)
	December 26, 1955 – December 30, 1955	Washington, D.C.	
	December 27, 1957 – December 30, 1957	Dallas, Texas	(Note: This was the 3rd joint Boulé/Conclave with Phi Beta Sigma.)
39th	August 12, 1959 – August 16, 1959	San Francisco, California	
41st	December 27, 1961 – December 30, 1961	Winston-Salem State Teacher's College; Winston-Salem, North Carolina	(Note: The theme was New Frontiers for Women in the Sixties.)
43rd	July 14, 1963 – July 20, 1963	Miami, Florida	
45th	July 11, 1965 – July 16, 1965	Waldorf-Astoria Hotel; New York City, New York	
46th	December 26, 1966 – December 31, 1966	Baton Rouge, Louisiana	(Note: The theme was Mobilizing Task Forces for Action in Community Development Programs.)
47th	August 11, 1968 – August 15, 1968	Sherman House Hotel; Chicago, Illinois	(Note: The theme was New Dimensions, The Forward Look.)
50th	August 2, 1970 – August 7, 1970	Washington, D.C.	(Note: This "Golden Boulé" marked the sorority's Fiftieth Anniversary. The theme was Meeting Human Needs Through Designing and Developing Methods of Improving the Delivery of Effective Service. At the meeting, the Amicettes were adopted as the sorority's junior high auxiliary.)
52nd	August 1972	Oklahoma City, Oklahoma	(Note: The Stork's Nest was adopted as a national program at this meeting.)
54th	August 11, 1974 – August 16, 1974	Philadelphia, Pennsylvania	
	July 25, 1976 – July 30, 1976	Atlanta, Georgia	
	July 23, 1978 – July 30, 1978	Houston, Texas	
	1980 (summer)	Washington, D.C.	
62nd	July 25, 1982 – July 30, 1982	Richmond, Virginia	(Note: The theme was Providing Political, Economic, and Spiritual Strength to Enhance the Human Condition Through Networking.)
64th	August 4, 1984 – August 10, 1984	Detroit, Michigan	(Note: The theme was Zetas Working Together for Progress: Rendering Service to Improve the Human Condition.)
66th	August 1986	Anaheim, California	
68th	July 10, 1988 – July 14, 1988	Baltimore, Maryland	(Note: The theme was Zeta Power – Designing strategies For the 21st Century.)
70th	July 15, 1990 – July 19, 1990	St. Louis, Missouri	(Note: The theme was Designing Strategies: Providing Outreach Services to Meet the Challenges of the 21st Century.)
71st	July 1991	Las Vegas, Nevada	(Note: This was the 4th joint Boulé/Conclave with Phi Beta Sigma.)
74th	July 1994	Orlando, Florida	(Note: During this meeting, the Pearlettes were added as third national youth auxiliary.)
76th	July 6, 1996 – July 11, 1996	Dallas, Texas	
78th	July 18, 1998 – July 24, 1998	Atlanta, Georgia	
	July 8, 2000 – July 14, 2000	Philadelphia, Pennsylvania	(Note: During this convention, the "Dress for Success" drive was launched.)
	July 6, 2002 – July 12, 2002	New Orleans, Louisiana	
	July 1, 2004 – July 7, 2004	Hollywood, California	(Note: Convention was hosted by Alpha Psi Zeta.)
85th	July 20, 2006 – July 28, 2006	Hollywood, Florida	
87th	June 28, 2008 – July 3, 2008	Las Vegas, Nevada	(Note: The theme was Diamonds in the Desert.)
	July 23, 2010 – July 27, 2010	Dallas, Texas	(Note: The theme was Boulé of Sisterly Love: Southern Style.)
	July 6, 2012 – July 10, 2012	Chicago, Illinois	(Note: The theme was The Magnificent Boulé.)
	July 15, 2014 – July 19, 2014	Washington, D.C.	(Note: The theme was Blazing New Paths: The Power of Scholarship, Service, Sisterhood and Finer Womanhood.)
	July 6, 2016 – July 10, 2016	Orlando, Florida	(Note: The theme was The Zeta Way – Be Inspired. Get Engaged. Stay Connected.)
	July 18, 2018 – July 22, 2018	New Orleans, Louisiana	(Note: The theme was The Zeta Way - Sisters Loved, Principles Lived, Paths Blazed.)
	October 3, 2020 – October 4, 2020	Virtual	(Note: This was the sorority's Centennial Boulé.)
	July 18, 2022 – July 24, 2022	Philadelphia, Pennsylvania	(Note: The theme was Honoring Our Founders, Continuing Their Legacy. The Dream Lives On!)
	July 23, 2024 – July 28, 2024	Indianapolis, Indiana	(Note: The theme was Finer Women Amplifying The Extraordinary Power of S.H.E. through Legacy, Leadership & Impact.)
