= Zeta Phi Beta =

Historically African American sorority

- ΖΦΒ
- Founded: January 16, 1920; 106 years ago Howard University
- Type: Social
- Affiliation: NPHC
- Status: Active
- Emphasis: African Americans
- Scope: International
- Motto: "A community-conscious, action-oriented organization"
- Pillars: Scholarship, Service, Sisterhood, and Finer Womanhood
- Colors: Royal Blue and Pure White
- Symbol: Dove
- Flower: White Rose
- Mascot: Dove
- Publication: The Archon
- Chapters: 850
- Nicknames: Zetas, ZPhiB, Finer Women
- Headquarters: 1734 New Hampshire Ave NW; Washington, DC 20009; United States
- Website: zphib1920.org

Zeta Phi Beta Sorority, Inc. (ΖΦΒ) is a historically African American sorority. Since its founding, Zeta Phi Beta has focused on addressing social causes.

Zeta Phi Beta is a non-profit 501(c)(7) organization that is divided into eight intercontinental regions and 800+ Chapters located in the US, Africa, Europe, Asia and the Caribbean. In 1948, Zeta Phi Beta became the first Greek-letter organization to charter a chapter in Africa (in Monrovia, Liberia). Zeta Phi Beta is the third-largest predominantly African-American sorority.

== History ==
=== Beginnings ===
In the spring of 1919, during a stroll on the campus of Howard University, Charles Robert Samuel Taylor, member of Phi Beta Sigma fraternity, told Arizona Cleaver his idea for a new sisterhood; a sister organization to his fraternity. Cleaver presented this idea to Pearl Anna Neal, Myrtle Tyler, Viola Tyler, and Fannie Pettie, and a new sisterhood was formed.

Cleaver secured permission from the Howard University administration to establish a campus sorority. On January 16, 1920, the sorority's first official meeting was held. The five students chose the name Zeta Phi Beta. Phi Beta was taken from Phi Beta Sigma to "seal and signify the relationship between the two organizations".

The newly established Zeta Phi Beta Sorority was given a formal introduction at Whitelaw Hotel by Phi Beta Sigma members Taylor and A. Langston Taylor. The two Sigma brothers had been a source of advice and encouragement during the establishment of the sorority and throughout its early days.

Alpha Kappa Alpha and Delta Sigma Theta sororities held a "Welcome to Campus" reception in the assembly room in Miner Hall, in honor of the new sorority. Later that year, in December 1920, the sorority held the first boule (convention) with members of Phi Beta Sigma at Howard University. The Archon, the sorority's official magazine was established shortly afterward. Later Boules were held in many locations across the United States.

Zeta Phi Beta was incorporated on March 30, 1923, in Washington, D.C. by sorority members Myrtle Tyler, Gladys Warrington, Joanna Houston, Josephine Johnson, and O. Goldia Smith. The sorority was incorporated by the state of Illinois in 1939.

=== Five Pearls ===
The Founders of Zeta Phi Beta were five collegiate students of Howard University. They are known to the members of the sorority as "The Five Pearls".

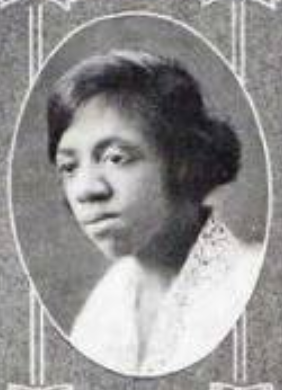
Pearl Anna Neal, from the 1922 Howard yearbook

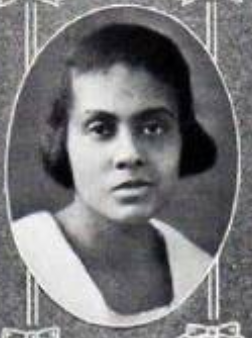
Fannie Pettie (later Watts), from the 1922 Howard yearbook

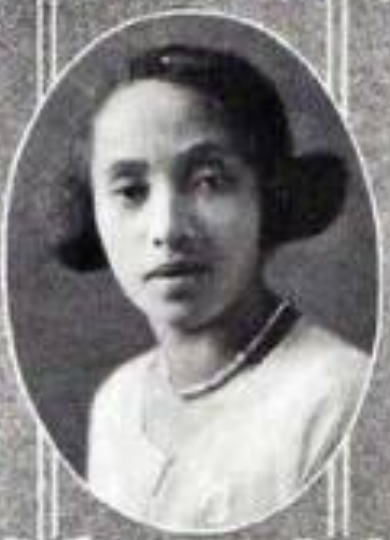
Myrtle Lavenia Tyler (later Faithful), from the 1922 Howard yearbook

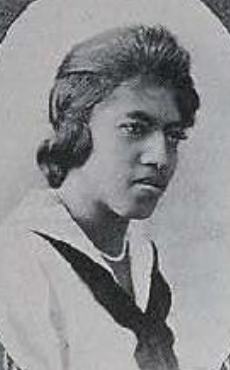
Viola Tyler Goings, from the 1920 Howard yearbook
- Arizona Cleaver (Stemons) was the first president of the Alpha chapter and the first national president of Zeta Phi Beta Sorority. She completed her graduate and post-graduate studies in the field of social work and was responsible for chartering numerous undergraduate and graduate chapters throughout the United States.
- Myrtle Tyler (Faithful) was the second national president of Zeta Phi Beta Sorority and blood sister to Viola Tyler. A high school mathematics and English teacher, Founder Tyler was an active member of Alpha Zeta chapter in Baltimore, Maryland.
- Viola Tyler (Goings) graduated from Howard University with a teaching degree and a major in math. She taught school in Ohio for many years and was always very active in community affairs.
- Fannie Pettie (Watts) graduated from Howard with a Bachelor of Arts degree in education and taught junior and senior high schools in Savannah, Georgia. She organized two additional Zeta chapters and had active membership in the Delta Alpha Zeta chapter.
- Pearl Anna Neal graduated from Howard University's Conservatory of Music and continued her studies at the Juilliard School of Music. In 1938, she was the first Black woman in New York to earn a master's degree in music from Columbia University. An extremely accomplished musician, Neal taught music in North Carolina public schools and served as a director of seniors majoring in music at Teachers College in Winston-Salem, NC.

=== Expansion ===
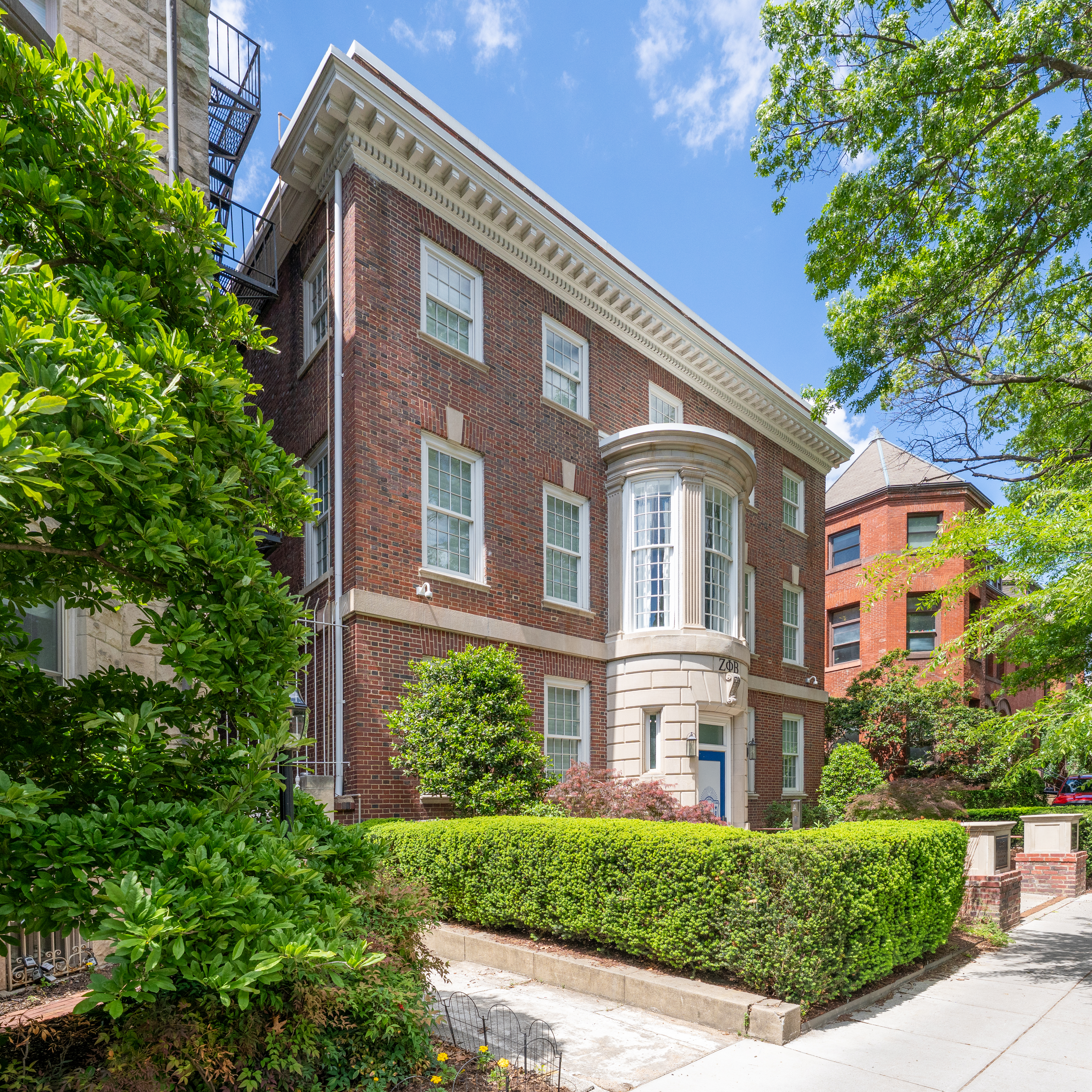
Headquarters (2026)

In 1923, Theta chapter at Wiley College became the first black sorority chapter in Texas. In 1959, Zeta Phi Beta purchased its current headquarters, located at 1734 New Hampshire Avenue NW on Dupont Circle in Washington, D.C., becoming the first organization under the National Pan-Hellenic Council to have a national headquarters for all operations.

Zeta Phi Beta was the first sorority to charter a chapter in Africa (Monrovia, Liberia). There are also chapters in U.S. Virgin Islands, Jamaica, Bahamas, Japan, Korea, Barbados, Haiti, Germany, Belgium, United Arab Emirates, Trinidad/Tobago and most recently Accra, Ghana.

On January 25, 2001, Zeta Phi Beta was granted non-governmental organization (NGO) status with the United Nations.

In 2005, Zeta Phi Beta completed its $2 million renovation of the international headquarters. The historic building has served as Zeta's home since its purchase in 1959.

In May 2019, Zeta Phi Beta revised its national policy to be inclusive of transgender women interested in joining the sorority. A few weeks prior to the revised national policy, the sorority issued a statement banning transgender women for membership consideration but after much backlash the sorority eventually issued a "diversity statement" changing its stance on transgender women. Zeta Phi Beta is the only National Pan-Hellenic Council organization to release an official statement welcoming transgender members.

== Symbols ==
Zeta Phi Beta's founding principles or pillars are Scholarship, Service, Sisterhood, and Finer Womanhood. Its motto is "A community-conscious, action-oriented organization". Its colors are royal blue and pure white. Its symbol is the dove. Its flower is a white rose. Its publication is The Archon.

== Activities ==
=== Zeta Day on the Hill ===
Held annually, Zeta Day on the Hill provides an opportunity for Zetas to exercise another level of civic responsibility by learning the protocols for interacting with and the knowledge needed to maximize engagement with congressional representatives. Zetas schedule meetings with their representative or their representative's designee to discuss, during brief sessions, issues of interest to the local, state, and national Zeta membership.

=== Z-H.O.P.E. ===
The goal of Z-H.O.P.E. (Zetas Helping Other People Excel) is to positively impact the lives of people at all stages of the human life cycle. This is through doing hard work and community service. Z-HOPE (Zetas Helping Other People Excel) is an international service initiative, introduced by the sorority's 22nd International Grand Basileus Barbara C. Moore.

Z-HOPE has six objectives. They are:

- To provide culturally appropriate informational activities according to the Z-HOPE program format
- To foster collaborative partnerships between community organizations with shared goals
- To promote the opportunities for expansion in Stork's Nest programs
- To facilitate community service and mentorship opportunities for members of the organization
- To provide an equitable chapter recognition program for community services rendered, and
- To provide a standard reporting format to concentrate efforts and demonstrate the organization's impact

As of 2006, more than 750,000 individuals have participated in Z-HOPE-related activities and programs.

=== Leadership program ===
The Zeta Organizational Leadership Program is a leadership training certification program developed by Zeta Phi Beta Sorority. The overarching goal of the ZOL program is to provide members of Zeta Phi Beta with essential leadership knowledge and skills.

== Philanthropy ==
In December 2010, the sorority partnered with Stevie Wonder to collect toys for his annual House Full of Benefit Concert. All of the sorority's 850 chapters signed on to collect toys for the program.

=== National Educational Foundation ===
The National Educational Foundation of Zeta Phi Beta Sorority, Inc. is a 501(c)3 trust organization created in 1975 and operated by Zeta Phi Beta to oversee the sorority's charitable and educational activities. The trust awards scholarship grants, conducts community educational programs and activities, and engages in Foundation scholarship related research.

The objectives of the Foundation, as outlined in the Trust Agreement and By-Laws adopted by the Board of Managers, are:

- to award scholarship grants to worthy students for the pursuit of higher education;
- to conduct community education programs that will aid individual and community living standards;
- to engage in other educational activities which will aid in the development of all women; and
- to engage in any appropriate research related to the purposes of the Foundation.

The Foundation partnered with Xavier University of New Orleans, The Consumer Health Foundation, the MidAtlantic Cancer Genetics Network, the Pennsylvania Legislative Black Caucus, and The Family Life Center of Shiloh Baptist Church to present conferences on human genome research in Washington, D. C., Atlanta Georgia, New Orleans, Louisiana, Philadelphia, Pennsylvania, and Chicago, Illinois.

=== Stork's Nest ===
Since 1971, Zeta Phi Beta has enjoyed a partnership with the March of Dimes to encourage women to seek prenatal care within the first trimester of pregnancy, thereby increasing the prevention of birth defects and infant mortality. Known as the Stork's Nest Program, this collaboration encourages participation and healthy behaviors during the pregnancy through two components - incentives and education. Nationwide, Zeta Phi Beta sponsors over 175 Stork's Nests. In 1997, during the celebration of the 25th anniversary of collaboration with the March of Dimes, the program was updated to include a new national logo, new educational materials, and new incentive items for those mothers participating in the program. As of 2005, the Stork's Nest Program has served over 28,000 women.

== Auxiliary organizations ==
=== Amicae ===
The Amicae group is composed of women who have not obtained a college degree but wish to assist Zeta Phi Beta members in local activities. As of 2016, there are over 175 Amicae groups in the U.S. The first Amicae group was organized in Omaha, Nebraska in 1948 by the Beta Psi Zeta chapter.

=== Archonettes ===
The Archonettes are composed of young high school-aged ladies (ages 14 to 18) who demonstrate an interest in the goals and the ideals of scholarship, sisterly love, and community service. Each Archonette group is affiliated with a local graduate chapter of Zeta Phi Beta.

=== Amicettes ===
The Amicettes are composed of girls aged 9 to 13 who are willing to strive toward the high ideals of Zeta Phi Beta Sorority and who demonstrate potential for leadership in service to the community. . Each Amicettes group is affiliated with a local chapter of Zeta Phi Beta.

=== Pearlettes ===
The Pearlettes are composed of young girls aged 4 to 8. Pearlettes are mentored by members of Zeta Phi Beta to become outstanding leaders in their communities.

=== Zeta Male Network ===
The Zeta Male Network is the title given to the support organization that includes males in the lives of members of Zeta Phi Beta.

== Controversies and member misconduct ==
Following a February 5, 2006 news report by WJLA, an ABC-affiliated TV station based in D.C., the U.S. Internal Revenue Service, Federal Bureau of Investigation and United States Attorney opened an investigation into alleged financial irregularities occurring with the sorority's National President Barbara C. Moore. Sorority member and National Executive Board member Natasha Stark was the whistleblower who notified WJLA of the president's wrongdoings. Moore admitted to using sorority funds for personal expenses such as clothes, shoes, jewelry, food, liquor, etc. but disputed the figures reported by WJLA. Despite her admission, the sorority's board of directors refused to remove her from office defying organization by-laws, attempted to suppress information reported by WJLA, and refused to fully cooperate with the FBI and IRS. The sorority's board of directors initially tried to resolve the matter privately by asking the president to sign a promissory note to repay over $300,000 of sorority funds used for personal expenses back to the sorority but that dissatisfied Stark. The purpose of the investigation was to determine if the president had obtained funds from the tax-exempt organization for personal gain which violated IRS codes. In retaliation for contacting WJLA, Stark was expelled for "violating her duty of loyalty to the sorority, engaging in conduct injurious to the sorority or its purposes, and unsisterly conduct." On March 20, 2007, Stark filed a lawsuit with the District of Columbia District Court requesting $1 million in damages. Stark's claims for breach of contract and negligence were dismissed at a September 11, 2008 status conference.

Entertainer Sheryl Underwood was elected as the 23rd International Grand Basileus (President), during the sorority's biennial business meeting in Las Vegas, Nevada in 2008. Her election as Grand Basileus was disputed by some members as illegitimate, but District of Columbia Superior Court Judge Gerald I. Fisher dismissed a lawsuit against the sorority and Underwood that asked the court to unseat Underwood.

In 2011, the chapter at the University of Maryland, College Park was placed under heavy scrutiny when a former pledge reported to authorities the serious abuse she endured from members of the organization. Seven members of the chapter were arrested for assault.

In 2012, a student at the University of California, Berkeley sued the sorority after experiencing hazing so disturbing and humiliating that she dropped out of school. In her lawsuit, she stated she had her head slammed into a wall, her pockets ripped from her jeans, was beat over the head while being forced to recite the sorority's history, forced to clean up the juice with only her back, and was subject to other illegal hazing activities.

In 2014, the chapter at the University of Memphis was given a three-year suspension for physically abusing and harassing pledges. One pledge's nose was broken after being repeatedly hit in the face by several Zetas. Two Zetas identified in a police report as being extremely abusive towards pledges dropped out of the university soon after the suspension was announced.

== See also ==
- College fraternities and sororities
- List of social sororities and women's fraternities
- List of African-American fraternities and sororities
