= Freedman =

Former slave

A freedman or freedwoman is a person who has been released from slavery, usually by legal means. Historically, slaves freed themselves (runaways or maroons) through escape, self-purchase, or rebellion; or were freed through manumission (granted freedom by their owners), emancipation (granted freedom as part of a larger group), or abolition (the outlawing of slavery in general).

== Ancient Rome ==
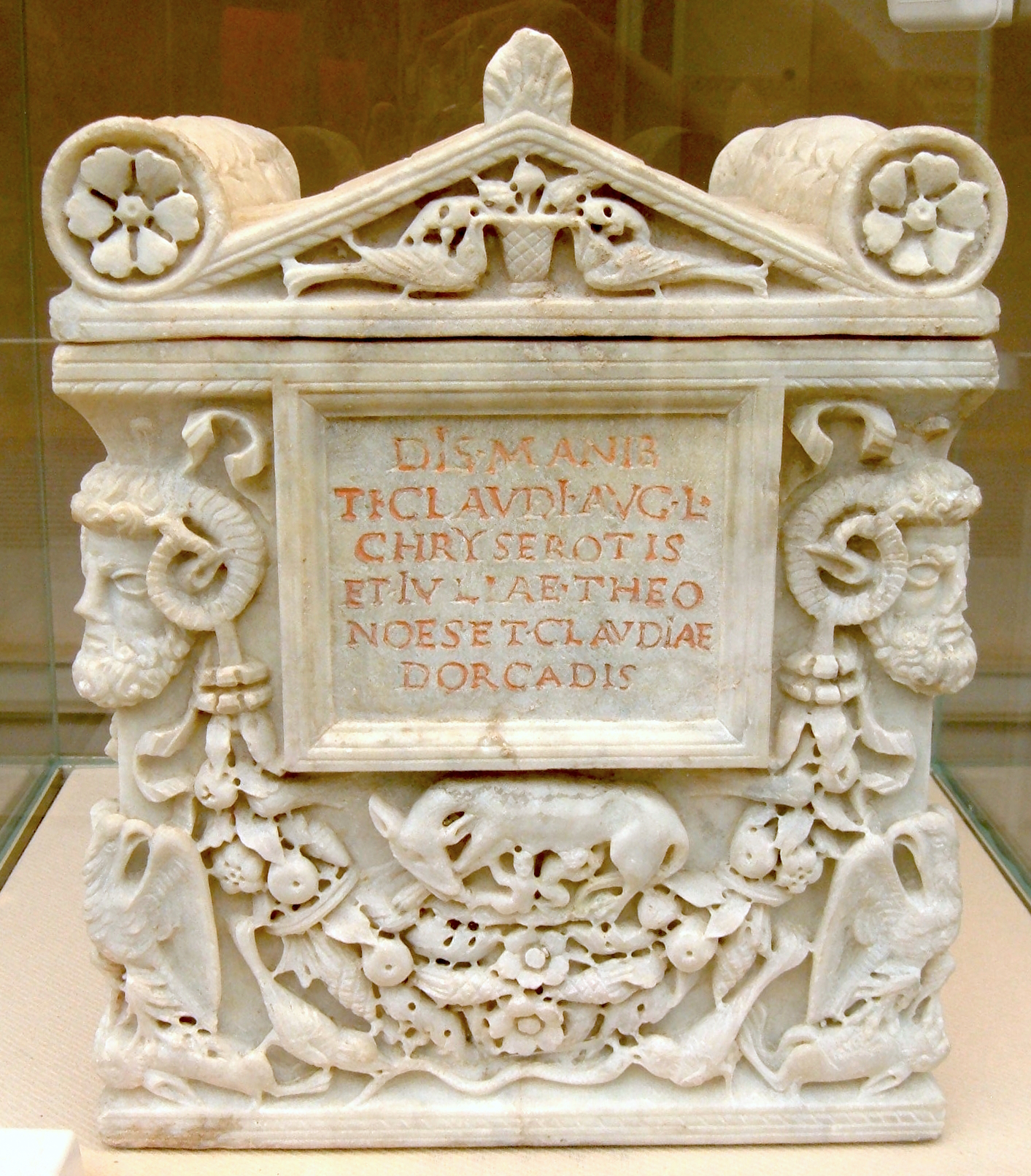
Cinerary urn for the freedman Tiberius Claudius Chryseros and two women, probably his wife and daughter

Rome differed from Greek city-states in allowing freed slaves to become plebeian citizens. The act of freeing a slave was called manumissio, from manus, "hand" (in the sense of holding or possessing something), and missio, the act of releasing. After manumission, a slave who had belonged to a Roman citizen enjoyed not only passive freedom from ownership, but active political freedom (libertas), including the right to vote. A slave who had acquired libertas was known as a libertus ("freed person", feminine liberta) in relation to his former master, who was called his or her patron (patronus).

As a social class, freed slaves were liberti, though later Latin texts used the terms libertus and libertini interchangeably. Libertini were not entitled to hold public office or state priesthoods, nor could they achieve legitimate senatorial rank. During the early Empire, however, freedmen held key positions in the government bureaucracy, so much so that Hadrian limited their participation by law. Any future children of a freedman would be born free, with full rights of citizenship.

The Claudian Civil Service set a precedent whereby freedmen could be used as civil servants in the Roman bureaucracy. In addition, Claudius passed legislation concerning slaves, including a law stating that sick slaves abandoned by their owners became freedmen if they recovered. The emperor was criticized for using freedmen in the Imperial Courts.

Some freedmen enjoyed enormous success and became quite wealthy. The brothers who owned House of the Vettii, one of the biggest and most magnificent houses in Pompeii, are thought to have been freedmen. A freedman who became rich and influential might still be looked down on by the traditional aristocracy as a vulgar nouveau riche. Trimalchio, a character in the Satyricon of Petronius, is a caricature of such a freedman.

== Arab-Muslim and North African slavery ==
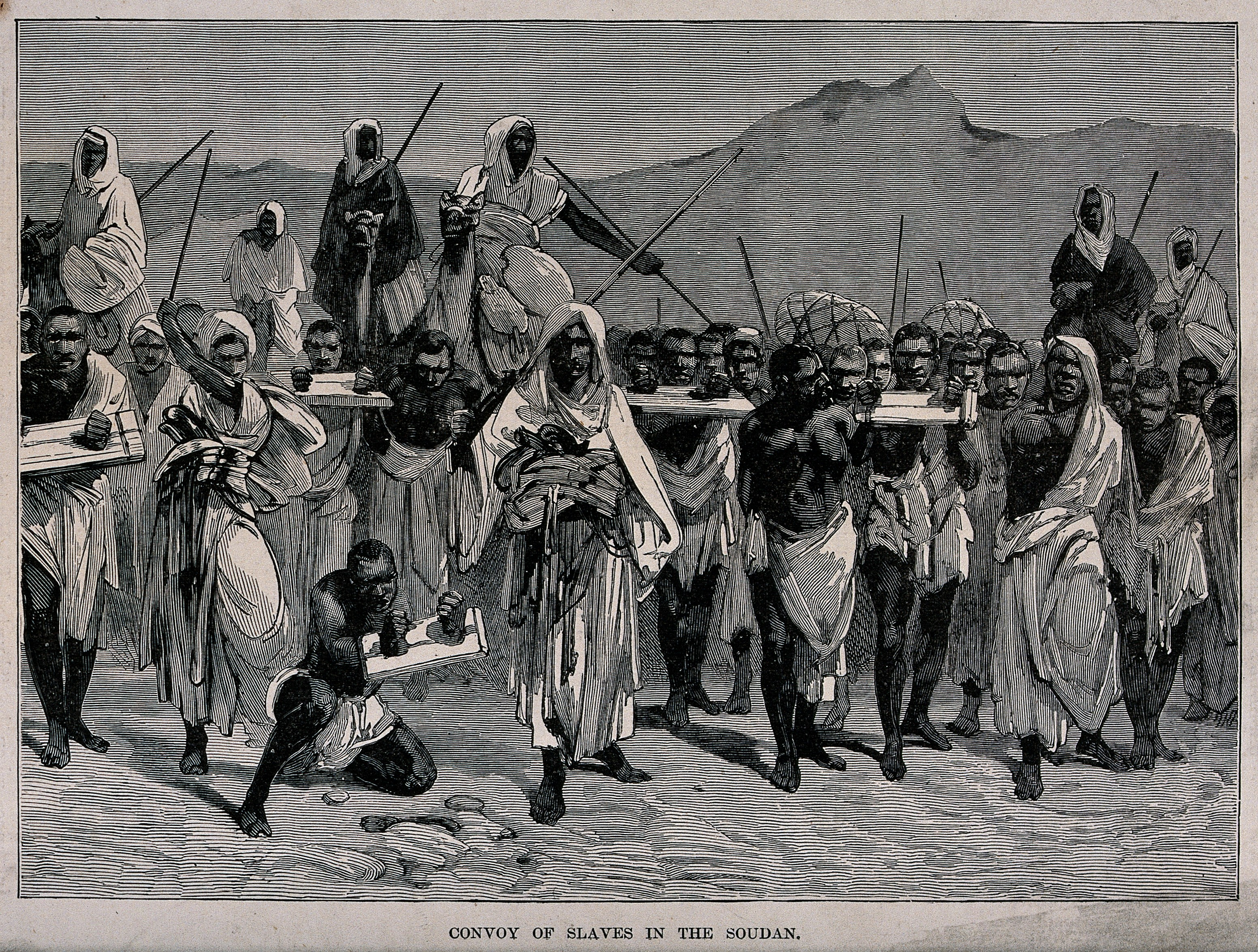
Arab-Muslim slave traders and their African captives in the Sahara, 19th century

The term "Eastern slave trade" refers to the Arab slave trade that supplied the early Muslim conquests throughout the Arab-Muslim world from the 7th to the 20th centuries, peaking in the 18th and 19th centuries. This term, which covers the Arab-Muslim slave trade, is symmetrical with the term "Western slave trade", which refers to the triangular trade on the Western coasts of Africa that supplied the European colonization of the Americas, and which includes the Atlantic slave trade.

The slaves of the Eastern slave trade came mainly from Sub-Saharan Africa, Northwestern Africa, Southern Europe, Slavic countries, the Caucasus, and the Indian subcontinent, and were imported by the Arab-Muslim slave traders into the Middle East and North Africa, the Horn of Africa, and the islands of the Indian Ocean. For centuries, Arab-Muslim slave traders took and transported an estimated 10 to 15 million native Africans to slavery throughout the Arab-Muslim world. They also enslaved Europeans (known as Saqaliba), as well as Caucasian and Turkic peoples, from coastal areas of the Mediterranean Region, the Balkans, Central Asia, and the Eurasian steppes.

The offspring of Mamluks were regarded as Muslim freedmen, and hence excluded from the Arab-Muslim slave trade; they were known as the awlād al-nās ("sons of respectable people"), who either fulfilled scribal and administrative functions or served as commanders of the non-Mamluk ḥalqa troops, serving the ruling Arab and Ottoman dynasties in the Muslim world.

== United States ==
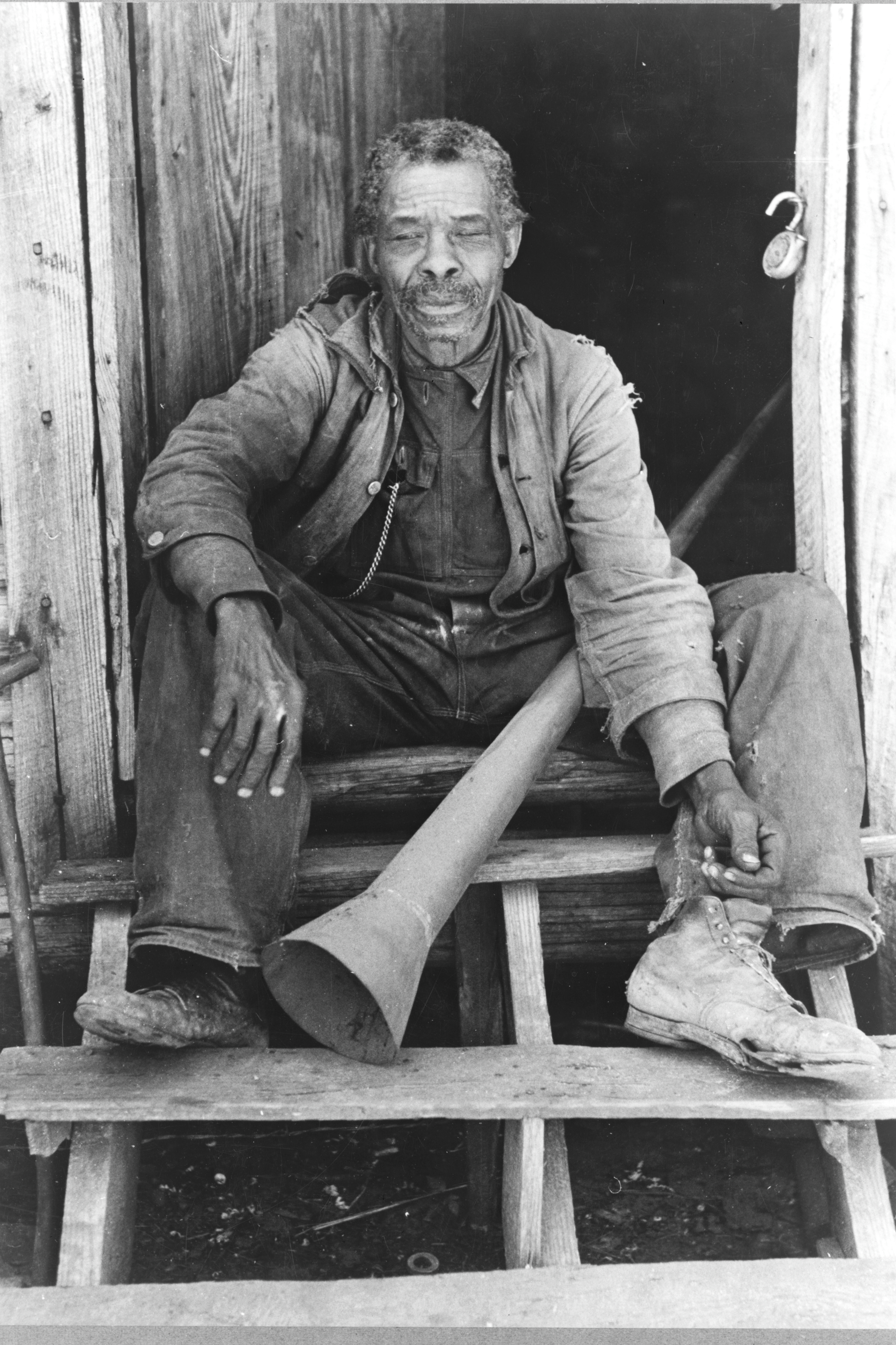
Freedman with an old horn used to call slaves photographed in Texas, 1939

The end of the Civil War brought millions of new freedmen, for whom the 13th, 14th, and 15th amendments were created.

The Emancipation Proclamation of 1863 declared all enslaved peoples in the Confederacy—states in rebellion and not under the control of the Union—to be permanently free. It did not end slavery in the four border states that had stayed in the Union. African slavery elsewhere was abolished by state action or with the ratification of the 13th Amendment to the U.S. Constitution in December 1865. The Civil Rights Act of 1866, passed over the veto of U.S. President Andrew Johnson, gave the formerly enslaved peoples full citizenship in the United States, though this did not guarantee them voting rights. The 14th Amendment made "All persons born or naturalized in the United States" citizens of the United States. The 15th Amendment gave voting rights to all adult males; only adult males had the franchise among White Americans. The 13th, 14th, and 15th Amendments are known as the "Civil War Amendments" or the "Reconstruction Amendments".

To help freedmen transition from slavery to freedom, including a free labor market, U.S. President Abraham Lincoln created the Freedmen's Bureau, which assigned agents throughout the former Confederate states. The Bureau also founded schools to educate freedmen, both adults and children; helped freedmen negotiate labor contracts; and tried to minimize violence against freedmen. The era of Reconstruction was an attempt to establish new governments in the former Confederacy and to bring freedmen into society as voting citizens. Northern church bodies, such as the American Missionary Association and the Free Will Baptists, sent teachers to the South to assist in educating freedmen and their children, and eventually established several colleges for higher education. U.S. Army occupation soldiers were stationed throughout the South via military districts enacted by the Reconstruction Acts; they protected freedmen in voting polls and public facilities from violence and intimidation by white Southerners, which were common throughout the region.

=== Native American freedmen ===
The Cherokee Nation, Choctaw Nation, Chickasaw Nation, Seminole Nation of Oklahoma, and Creek Nation were among those Native American tribes that held enslaved Africans before and during the American Civil War. They supported the Confederacy during the war, supplying some warriors in the West, as they were promised their own state if the Confederacy won. After the end of the war, the U.S. required these tribes to make new peace treaties, and to emancipate their African slaves. They were required to offer full citizenship in their tribes to those freedmen who wanted to stay with the tribes. Numerous families had intermarried by that time or had other personal ties. If freedmen left the tribes, they would become U.S. citizens.

==== Cherokee freedmen ====
In the late 20th century, the Cherokee Nation voted for restrictions on membership to only those descendants of people listed as "Cherokee by blood" on the Dawes Rolls of the early 20th century, a decision that excluded most Cherokee Freedmen (by that time this term referred to descendants of the original group). In addition to arguing that the post-Civil War treaties gave them citizenship, the freedmen have argued that the Dawes Rolls were often inaccurate, recording as freedmen even those individuals who had partial Cherokee ancestry and were considered Cherokee by blood. The Choctaw freedmen and Creek freedmen have similarly struggled with their respective tribes over the terms of citizenship in contemporary times. The tribes have wanted to limit those who can benefit from tribal citizenship, in an era in which gaming casinos are yielding considerable revenues for members. The majority of members of the tribes have voted to limit membership. Descendants of freedmen, however, maintain that their rights to citizenship granted under the post-Civil War treaties should be restored. In 2017, the Cherokee freedmen were granted citizenship again in the tribe.

== Australia ==
Many convicted people from the United Kingdom were sentenced to be transported to Australia between 1788 and 1868. Also, many came from the United Kingdom and Europe voluntarily, planning to settle in Australia, some as pastors and missionaries, others seeking to make a living by trade or farming. When convicts finished their sentence, they were freed and referred to as "freedmen" or "freed men". However, many of these who were freed wanted to claim the label "free men". But those who had come freely to Australia wanted to reserve the label "free men" exclusively for themselves, distinguishing themselves above those who had been "freed".

== See also ==
- Abolitionism
  - Abolitionism in Brazil
  - Abolitionism in France
  - Abolitionism in the United Kingdom
  - Abolitionism in the United States
- Black Seminoles
- Child labour
- Child soldiers
- Choctaw freedmen
- Creek Freedmen
- Freedman's Hospital
- Freedmen's Aid Society
- Freedmen's Bureau
- Freedmen's Bureau bills
- Freedmen's Colony of Roanoke Island
- Freedman's Savings Bank
- Freedmen's town
- Slavery in the 21st century
  - Slavery in 21st-century jihadism
  - Slavery in contemporary Africa
