= Arizona Cleaver Stemons =

American social worker

- Born: 1898; Pike County, Missouri
- Died: March 1980 (aged 81–82); Philadelphia, Pennsylvania

Arizona Cleaver Stemons (1898 – March 1980), born Arizona Leedonia Cleaver, was an American social worker. While she was a student at Howard University in 1920, she was one of the five founding members of the Zeta Phi Beta sorority, and its first president.

== Early life ==
Arizona Leedonia Cleaver was born in Pike County, Missouri, and raised in Hannibal, Missouri.

== Career ==
Arizona Cleaver was one of the "Five Pearls", the founding members of Zeta Phi Beta, when it began at Howard University in 1920. She was the sorority's first chapter president, and its first Grand Basileus (national president).

She organized the Philadelphia graduate chapter of Zeta, and remained active nationally as the sorority's first president emerita for several decades, and was a popular speaker at Zeta events into her seventies. "This country of ours," she said in a speech in 1952, "must oppose movements that divide the races and seek an economy that will feed, clothe, and house the nation, without regard to race, creed, or national origin."

After 1933 she worked as a social worker in Philadelphia, working with the Society for the Prevention of Cruelty to Children and for the city's Department of Public Welfare.

== Personal life and legacy ==
In 1928, Arizona Cleaver became the third wife of James Samuel Stemons, a writer and union organizer. James Stemons died in 1959. Arizona Cleaver Stemons died in March 1980, aged 81 years, in Philadelphia.

The Philadelphia graduate chapter of Zeta took ownership of her home after her death, and continues to maintain the property. In 2015, a new monument was placed at her gravesite in Eden Cemetery near Philadelphia, by the sorority, and a historical marker about Stemons was placed near the site of her high school in Hannibal.

In 2016, a park in Hannibal was renamed the Douglass School/Arizona Cleaver Stemons Park. In 2019, to mark the centennial of Zeta Phi Beta, a street in Philadelphia was renamed Arizona C. Stemons Way.

The Zeta Phi Beta sorority in 2019 announced a US$100,000 scholarship named the Triumphant Founder Arizona C. Stemons Centennial Scholarship. There are several other scholarships named for Stemons.
