= Freedmen's Colony of Roanoke Island =

Freed slaves colony in North Carolina

The Freedmen's Colony of Roanoke Island, also known as the Roanoke Island Freedmen's Colony, or "Freedman's Colony", was founded in 1863 during the Civil War after Union Major General John G. Foster, Commander of the 18th Army Corps, captured the Confederate fortifications on Roanoke Island off North Carolina in 1862. He classified the slaves living there as "contraband", following the precedent of General Benjamin Butler at Fort Monroe in 1861, and did not return them to Confederate slaveholders. In 1863, by the Emancipation Proclamation, all slaves in Union-occupied territories were freed.

The island colony started as one of what were 100 contraband camps by the war's end, but it became something more. The African Americans lived as freedmen and civilians. They were joined by former slaves from the mainland, seeking refuge and freedom with the Union forces. They were paid for their work and sought education, along with their children.

As commanding officer of the Department of North Carolina, in 1863 Foster appointed Horace James, a Congregational chaplain, as the "Superintendent of Negro Affairs in the North Carolina District", to supervise the contraband camps and administer to freedmen. James was based at New Bern, where he managed the Trent River contraband camp. James believed the Roanoke Island Colony was an important experiment in black freedom and a potential model for other freedmen communities. Freedmen built churches and set up the first free school for black children here; and they were soon joined by Northern missionary teachers who came to the South to help the effort. There was a core group of about six teachers, but a total of 27 teachers served at the island. As the war went on, conditions became more difficult at the crowded colony, whose residents suffered infectious diseases.

In 1865 President Andrew Johnson ordered the return of all property under his "Amnesty Proclamation", and the lands cultivated and occupied by contraband camps were returned to owners. The freedmen were not given rights to their holdings in the Colony, and most left the island. Its soil had proved too poor to support many subsistence farmers. In later 1865, the US Army directed the dismantling of the three forts on the island. By 1867, the colony was abandoned, but about 300 freedmen still lived there independently in 1870. Some of their descendants live there today.

== History ==
Long used for fishing camps by varying cultures of indigenous peoples, Roanoke Island was first colonized by an English explorer in 1584. Sir Walter Raleigh tried to settle people there, to found a colony on what is now American soil. Raleigh sent 100 men to Roanoke Island. The settlement was unsuccessful and abandoned within a year. In 1587, another 110 colonists were planted on the island. Captain John White, named governor by Raleigh, returned to England in August that year for more supplies. Delayed by warfare, when he returned three years later, he found the island utterly abandoned. A popular regional myth tells that the colonists were absorbed by an Algonquian-speaking tribe, but historians say there is no evidence for it. They believe the colonists died by starvation and Powhatan Indian attack.

By the mid-1600s, English settlers colonized the island and established a permanent settlement. They gradually tried to develop plantations, using imported African slaves as labor, but the soil was rather poor. The island produced some commodity crops.

When North Carolina seceded from the Union in 1861, the Confederacy made plans to fortify Roanoke Island to protect the bay and inland waterways. By that winter, the army had built three forts, although they were relatively weak and too small for the number of occupying troops. On February 8, 1862, the Union general Ambrose E. Burnside easily captured Roanoke Island from Confederate general Henry A. Wise (former governor of the state of Virginia (1856–1860)). The Union maintained control of the island through the end of the war.

As slaves learned of the Union victory, they migrated to the island for freedom with Union forces and protection from the Confederacy. They quickly began to form refugee camps. General Burnside declared the refugees "contraband" of war, in a policy initiated by General Benjamin Butler at Fort Monroe in 1861, and granted the slaves freedom. The number of freedmen living on the island increased from 250 in the first few months, to more than 1,000 by the end of 1862. They formed a community, organizing the first free school for black children in North Carolina, and churches. The majority converted old Confederate barracks into their new homes, which became known as "Camp Foster" after one of the generals who had defeated the Confederates. Able-bodied freedmen worked for the Union, especially in construction, such as rebuilding the forts and adding to docks. The Army paid them for their work.

In 1862 General John G. Foster became commander of the Department of North Carolina. After the Emancipation Proclamation, he appointed Horace James, a Congregational chaplain, as "Superintendent of Negro Affairs for the North Carolina District." James was to develop a self-sustaining colony on the island and manage other contraband camps in the state, such as one earlier established at his base of New Bern, called the Trent River contraband camp. James was to settle the people, give them farming tools, and teach them to prepare for a free community.

Based at New Bern, James took a special interest in the Roanoke Freedmen's Colony. He believed it could be an important model for resettlement of other freedmen after the war. President Lincoln's Emancipation Proclamation had freed slaves in Confederate areas occupied by Union troops. Many of them moved to Union camps for protection.

== Life in the Colony ==
=== Enlistment of freedmen in the Union Army ===
The Roanoke Island Freedmen's Colony was a safe haven for slaves seeking refuge with the Union Army during the Civil War. Most freedmen on Roanoke Island assisted the Union Army: others joined the army as soldiers when the United States Colored Troops were founded, and some men worked as spies, scouts and guides, since they knew the area and its waterways well. They completed dangerous and crucial missions for the Union cause. Freedmen recruited from Roanoke Island formed the "first company of the North Carolina Colored Volunteers".

Major General Rush Hawkins, who succeeded Foster in 1863 at the command on the island, ordered the freedmen who enlisted in the army or worked for the military be paid "ten dollars a month plus one ration and a soldier's allowance of clothing." According to an article by the National Park Service, "of nearly 4,000 North Carolina enlistees, over 150 men were recruited from the Roanoke Island community alone." The Union Army allowed families of black soldiers to live at Roanoke Island as a place of refuge. Those men who were not recruited by the army served as woodcutters, teamsters, longshoremen, carpenters, blacksmiths, and workers in other trades. Many freedwomen worked as cooks and laundresses at the Union camp.

=== Self-sufficiency ===
Hawkins provided for payment for the labor of freedwomen and older boys, and allotting supplies to families:

Each woman and each boy aged twelve to sixteen were to be paid four dollars a month plus one ration; in addition, each woman was to receive money equal to a soldier's allowance of clothing, while each boy aged twelve to sixteen would receive a soldier's allowance of clothing. Each child under twelve would receive one ration and remain with his or her parents.

The Army allocated small plots of land to the households of the colony, and encouraged the freedmen to produce crops for food supplements. Under James' direction, they created fisheries as well, to make the island more self-sufficient. The creation of a sawmill and marketing of artisan goods helped the economy of the island. Many adults worked for the Union Army and were given wages and rations as payment for their services. The Commander on the island, Col. Rush Hawkins, also helped preserve the slave families who came to the island for refuge. Ownership of land, practice of a trade, and the ability to live with their families gave the freedmen a "taste of citizenship, family life, and hope".

== Horace James ==
Reverend Horace James was an evangelical Congregational minister from Worcester, Massachusetts. He was born to Galen James, a deacon, and his wife in the city of Medford. After studying at common schools, James attended Yale College, graduating in 1840. He went on to study theology, graduating from seminary school in 1843. He first served as the pastor at a church in Wrentham, Massachusetts, beginning in November 1843. He married Helen Leavitt of Walpole, New Hampshire.

After the American Civil War started, James joined the Union Army as a chaplain, by then having had nearly 20 years experience as a pastor. By 1862, he was assigned to the forces that occupied North Carolina.

In April 1863, the general appointed him as the "Superintendent of Negro Affairs for the District of North Carolina". He was to arrange for food, shelter, adequate clothing and medical care for the many blacks in the area, who had come to Union lines for freedom and refuge.

James believed that a lumber industry would help the Roanoke colony grow and become economically self-sufficient. He had a sawmill built on the island, so that lumber could be processed and sold to the government. Other natural resources could be sold elsewhere. He hoped to show that "free labor and technology was always superior to the slave system." The sawmill had a seventy-horsepower engine, powerful for that time and venue. The mill was located at Pork Point near Union headquarters. A soldier stationed on the island described it in 1864 as "a first class affair, like most anything belonging to the Government." James intended to arrange for the freedmen to get some of the lumber, so they could build sturdier cabins than their traditional split-pine one-room structures:

Each house contains but one room, no rooms above. The boards used for building are made as follows. They cut down a pitch pine tree, then cut it in logs eight feet long, then with the ax and wedge, split into boards about 3/4 inches in thickness, the grain being perfectly straight, but makes a very uneven surface. The wind blows through the crevices.

James advocated a "New Social Order in the South," to replace slavery with free institutions. The freedpeople had a variety of skills: many were artisans, who made baskets, shoes, barrels, shingles, and boats, which could be traded or sold. James intended to market both the natural resources and the freedmen's crops, such as cotton, corn, turpentine, resin, tar, timber, fish, oysters, wood, reeds, and grapes, to make the colony self-sufficient. While thinking freedmen should have the rights of citizens, he also held that "there was a natural stratification of society" and African Americans were near the bottom.

== Missionary aid ==
Much of the aid, education, and social work on the island was planned and carried out by representatives of the American Missionary Association, also known as AMA. The AMA worked to evangelize slaves and convert them to Christianity (if they were not already so). They sent missionaries to Roanoke Island to aid the colony through education, medicine, food, and religious services. They also preached the Gospel to the freedmen. Education classes were started. The state of medicine in the colony, as in society in general, was informal. Missionaries with little to no medical training administered medicine to the sick on the island. Gradually they learned the adequate dosages and which medicines applied to certain diseases. There were no antibiotics or vaccines, so medicine consisted of folk remedies, bloodletting and surgery. The freedwomen were knowledgeable of herbal remedies, which were often more effective than what trained doctors could offer at the time.

Other organizations, such as the National Freedman's Relief Association and the New England Freedmen's Aid Society of Boston, also sent representatives and aid to the colony. In contrast to the AMA, however, the National Freedman's Relief Association was not evangelical. It promoted abolition of slavery and encouraged the freedmen to "develop self-discipline, self-reliance, and self-support."

Religious practices formed a core of activities during this time. Missionaries held Sunday schools each week, often taught by the same teachers who led reading and writing classes during the week. Monthly Sabbath school concerts featured students' singing hymns and reciting passages from the Bible. Sunday evening worship services were "well attended" by the freedmen.

== Education ==
Education was viewed as the key to "prepare the freedpeople for citizenship". Under the supervision of the Union military, the freedmen built schools, churches, and about 600 cabins. The schools were simple log cabins. Both children and adults were eager to learn to read and write, as most of the slaves had not had any formal education in these skills. Missionaries, mostly unmarried women teachers from New England, were the prime teachers. There was a core group of about seven teachers, but altogether 27 teachers served at the island.

=== First teachers and schools ===
In October 1863, Elizabeth James arrived from the AMA. She was a cousin of the Reverend James, and had experience as a teacher and as the principal of a school in Milford. In February 1864, she founded the Lincoln School in Camp Foster. She noted the students had "an intense desire to learn."

Ella Roper opened the Whipple School, which had a roster of 200 students. In March 1864 Samuel Nickerson started the Cypress Chapel School. Although the facilities and supplies were limited in each case, the freedmen's eagerness to learn kept each classroom filled "to its utmost capacity".

== Decline of the Colony ==
As the number of freedmen grew to 3900, the colony had difficulty in providing housing. Sanitation suffered on the island as there were no systems to handle it. Infectious diseases began to spread in the crowded conditions. When severe diseases such as smallpox, cholera, and dysentery arose, no one at the time understood how they were transmitted, and there were no treatments. The missionaries could do little more than the freedmen. The colony began the "downward slide from which [it] was unable to recover." The increase in the number of freedmen strained their relationship with the Union military.

As more freedmen entered the Union Army, their families became more dependent on the government and military for aid because of the island's isolation. The Army pressed the refugees for more labor as the war dragged on. In one case in late 1864, military officers forced some freedmen who had been working for the Quartermaster's Department on Roanoke Island to leave and work on construction of the Dutch Gap Canal to divert the James River in Virginia. The commanding officers, such as Colonel Rush Hawkins, had ordered subordinates to treat freedmen "with respect," but tensions arose. Bad harvest seasons caused the residents to suffer from lack of food. They had already found that the soil was too poor to support the needed level of cultivation for the population. Rations were reduced in the late stages of the war, which made the inhabitants more desperate. According to Elizabeth James, a teacher, the freedmen would "steal fearfully" from each other. She said, "they are hungry" so "they steal anything they can lay their hands on anywhere."

When President Johnson issued his "Amnesty Proclamation" in 1865, he ordered all "property seized by the Union forces during the war be returned." The lands used for the contraband camps were returned to their former Confederate owners, and all the camps were dismantled. At the Roanoke Island Colony, the freedmen were told they had no rights to the plots they had cultivated for years. The US Army helped most freedmen return to the mainland, at their choice. Some returned to former plantations and became sharecroppers, tenant farmers or laborers. After the war, numerous freedmen moved from rural areas to towns and cities to evade white supervision and gain more opportunities as craftsmen.

Freedmen complained that federal occupation forces stole from them regularly in the aftermath of the war, but their concerns were ignored by the post commander.

In late 1865, the Army dismantled the forts on the island, which further disrupted the colony. By 1867, the colony was abandoned, although some freedmen continued to live on the island. The 1870 census recorded 300 blacks in 60 households.

== Legacy ==
The Roanoke Island Freedmen's Colony was important for educating hundreds of freedmen in literacy, paying adults and older children for their work, helping them to establish churches and community, and helping preserve their families at a time of war.

=== Letters from Roanoke Island ===
Numerous transcribed letters by Horace James and the missionary teachers, as well as some of the freedmen, may be viewed at the website, "Documents", Roanoke Island Freedmen's Colony. They express vividly the conditions of the freedmen and the colony.

== Commemoration ==
- 2001, the Dare County Heritage Trail committee erected a marble monument to the Roanoke Island Freedmen's Colony on the island at the Fort Raleigh National Historic Site, which commemorates the first English colony.
- 2004, the monument and island were added as sites to the National Underground Railroad Network to Freedom, developed by the National Park Service.

== Works cited ==
- Bradley, Mark L. (2011). Bluecoats and Tar Heels: Soldiers and Civilians in Reconstruction North Carolina (paperback ed.). Lexington: The University of Kentucky Press. ISBN 978-0-8131-3385-0.
