= American Missionary Association =

New York-based abolitionist movement

The American Missionary journal cover

The American Missionary Association (AMA) was a Protestant-based abolitionist group founded on September 3, 1846 (180 years ago) in Albany, New York. The main purpose of the organization was abolition of slavery, education of African Americans, promotion of racial equality, and spreading Christian values. Its members and leaders were of both races; the Association was chiefly sponsored by the Congregationalist churches in New England. The AMA played a significant role in several key historical events and movements, including the Civil War, Reconstruction, and the Civil Rights Movement.

In the 1850s it assisted the operation of the Underground Railroad for men and women fleeing enslavement in the South. Starting in 1861, it opened camps in the South for former slaves. It played a major role during and after the Reconstruction Era in promoting education for blacks in the South by establishing numerous schools and colleges, as well as paying for teachers. It helped establish Black churches and civic organizations. Its teachers and workers were targets of white supremacy groups such as the Ku Klux Klan. Outside the South it also promoted schools for Native Americans and immigrants. The AMA continued to play a role in the Civil Rights Movement in the 20th century, supporting the work of activists such as Martin Luther King Jr. and supporting legal efforts to desegregate public schools.

== History ==
The American Missionary Association was started by members of the American Home Missionary Society (AHMS) and the American Board of Commissioners for Foreign Missions (ABCFM), who were disappointed that their first organizations refused to take stands against slavery and accepted contributions from slaveholders. From the beginning the leadership was integrated: the first board was made up of 12 men, four of them black. One of its primary objectives was to abolish slavery. The AMA (American Missionary Association) was one of the organizations responsible for pushing slavery onto the national political agenda.

The organization started the American Missionary magazine, published from 1846 through 1934.

Among the AMA's achievements was the founding of anti-slavery churches. For instance, the abolitionist Owen Lovejoy was among the Congregational ministers of the AMA who helped start 115 anti-slavery churches in Illinois before the American Civil War, building on the strong westward migration of population to that area. Another member, Rev. Mansfield French, an Episcopalian who became a Methodist, helped found Wilberforce University in Ohio.

Members of the AMA began their support of education for blacks before the Civil War. Once war had begun, they recruited teachers for the numerous contraband camps that developed in Union-occupied territory in the South. In slaveholding Union states, such as Kentucky, the AMA staffed schools for both the newly emancipated United States Colored Troops and their families, such as at Camp Nelson, now known as Camp Nelson Heritage National Monument. Leading this effort was Rev. John Gregg Fee.

Rev. French was assigned to Port Royal, South Carolina, and went on a speaking tour with Robert Smalls, who famously escaped enslavement, as well as met with President Abraham Lincoln, Secretary of War Edwin M. Stanton and Treasury Secretary Salmon P. Chase, jointly convincing them to allow blacks to serve in the Union military. By war's end, Union forces had organized 100 contraband camps, and many had AMA teachers.

The AMA also served the Roanoke Island Freedmen's Colony (1863–1867). Located on an island occupied by Union troops, the colony was intended to be self-sustaining. It was supervised by Horace James, a Congregational chaplain appointed by the Army as "Superintendent for Negro Affairs in the North Carolina District". The first of 27 teachers who volunteered through the AMA was his cousin, Elizabeth James. By 1864 the colony had more than 2200 residents, and both children and adults filled the classrooms in the several one-room schools, as they were eager for learning. The missionary teachers also evangelized and helped provide the limited medical care of the time.

== Reconstruction ==
=== Schools and colleges founded ===
The AMA's pace of founding schools and colleges increased during and after the war. Freedmen, historically free blacks (many of whom were "mulattoes" of mixed race), and white sympathizers alike believed that education was a priority for the newly freed people.

It created and supported Atlanta University, Hampton Institute, Fisk University; Talladega College; Tougaloo College; Straight College (now Dillard University); Tillotson College (now Huston-Tillotson); and LeMoyne College (now LeMoyne Owen). Altogether, "the AMA founded eleven colleges and more than five hundred schools for the freedmen of the South during and after the Civil War. It spent more money for that purpose than did the Freedmen's Bureau of the federal government."

=== Other work ===
In addition, the AMA organized the Freedmen's Aid Society, which recruited northern teachers for the schools and arranged to find housing for them in the South.

=== White supremacy counterattack ===
In the mid-1870s, white Democrats began to regain control of state legislatures through violence and intimidation at the polls that suppressed Republican voting. The Association expressed disappointment at the failures of the Reconstruction Era but never wavered in opposing disenfranchisement and continued the struggle over the following decades. By the 1870s, the AMA national office had relocated to New York City.

=== Overseas missions ===
While the AMA became widely known in the United States for its work in opposition to slavery and in support of education for freedmen, it also sponsored and maintained missions in numerous nations overseas. The 19th-century missionary effort was strong in India, China and east Asia. It was strongly supported by Congregational and Christian churches. Over time, the association became most closely aligned with the Congregational Christian Churches, established in 1931 as a union between those two groups of churches.

Most of those congregations became members of the United Church of Christ (UCC) in the late 20th century. The AMA maintained a distinct and independent identity until 1999, when a restructuring of the UCC merged it into the Justice and Witness Ministries division.

== American Missionary ==
Its magazine, American Missionary, was published 1846–1934, and had a circulation of 20,000 in the 19th century, ten times that of the abolitionist William Garrison's magazine. The Cornell University Library has editions from 1878–1901 accessible online in its Making of America digital library.

== Legacy ==
The records of the American Missionary Association are housed at the Amistad Research Center at Tulane University in New Orleans.

== List of schools associated with the American Missionary Association ==
- Atlanta University (took over ownership in 1865), now Clark Atlanta University in Atlanta, Georgia;
- Avery Normal Institute (1867), now part of the College of Charleston in Charleston, South Carolina;
- Berea College in Kentucky (1855) in Berea, Kentucky;
- Dillard University (1869 in New Orleans, Louisiana);
- Fisk University (1866) in Nashville, Tennessee;
- Gregory Normal School (1868 to 1921) in Wilmington, North Carolina;
- Hampton Institute (1868) now Hampton University in Hampton, Virginia;
- Howard University (1867), founded in cooperation with the Freedmen's Bureau in Washington, D.C.;
- Howe Institute (1888 to 1933), Baptist primary and grammar school in New Iberia, Louisiana;
- Huston–Tillotson University (established in 1877 as Tillotson College, merged with Samuel Huston College in 1952) in Austin, Texas;
- LeMoyne–Owen College (1871) founded as LeMoyne College in Memphis, Tennessee;
- Lincoln Academy (took over ownership in 1888) elementary school and secondary school in Kings Mountain, North Carolina;
- Talladega College (1867) founded as Swayne School in Talladega, Alabama;
- Tougaloo College (1869) in Jackson, Mississippi

== See also ==
- African American founding fathers of the United States
- American Home Missionary Society (AHMS) the AMA split from this group
- American Board of Commissioners for Foreign Missions (ABCFM), the AMA also split from this group
- American Baptist Home Mission Society, a rival group
- Dan Beach Bradley — Siam, 1857 to 1873
- Freedmen's Schools
