= List of Phi Beta Sigma chapters =

Phi Beta Sigma (ΦΒΣ) is an international historically Black fraternity. Founded on January 9, 1914, on the campus of Howard University in Washington, D.C., Phi Beta Sigma has chartered chapters at other colleges, universities, and cities, and named them with Greek-letters. The fraternity's expansion started with its second (Beta) and third (Gamma) chapters, chartered at Wiley College and Morgan State University respectively in 1915. Today, the fraternity serves through a membership of more than 200,000 men in over 700 chapters in the United States, Europe, Asia, and the Caribbean. The following list includes both active and inactive chapters throughout the world.

The fraternity has reserved the designation Omega chapter as a memorial to those brothers who are deceased. Alumni chapters are indicated by Sigma at the end of their chapter name.

== Regions ==
The seven regions of Phi Beta Sigma Fraternity both within the United States and internationally

Phi Beta Sigma Fraternity organizes its chapters according to their regions in the United States and abroad. The seven regions are each led by a regional director and a regional board. A comprehensive list of regions is shown below:

- Eastern (Connecticut, Delaware, District of Columbia, Maine, Maryland, Massachusetts, New Hampshire, New Jersey, New York, Pennsylvania, Rhode Island, Vermont, Virginia, West Virginia, the United States Virgin Islands, Africa, and Europe)
- Great Lakes (Illinois, Indiana, Iowa, Kentucky, Michigan, Minnesota, Ohio, and Wisconsin)
- Gulf Coast (Louisiana, New Mexico and Texas)
- Southeastern (North Carolina, South Carolina and all of Tennessee east of the 86th Longitude)
- Southern (Alabama, The Bahamas, Florida, Georgia, and Mississippi)
- Southwestern (Arkansas, Kansas, Missouri, Nebraska, Oklahoma and all of Tennessee west of the 86th Longitude)
- Western (Alaska, Arizona, California, Colorado, Hawaii, Idaho, Montana, Nevada, North Dakota, Oregon, South Dakota, Utah, Washington, Wyoming and Asia)

=== Eastern ===
The states that make up the Eastern Region are: Connecticut, Delaware, District of Columbia, Maine, Maryland, Massachusetts, New Hampshire, New Jersey, New York, Pennsylvania, Rhode Island, Vermont, Virginia, and West Virginia, along with international chapters in Africa, Europe, the United Kingdom, and the U.S. Virgin Islands.

==== Collegiate chapters ====
| Name | Charter date and range | Institution | Location | Status | Notes | Ref. |
|---|---|---|---|---|---|---|
| Alpha | April 15, 1914 | Howard University | Washington, D.C. | Active | The first established chapter of Phi Beta Sigma | |
| Gamma | November 10, 1916 | Morgan State University | Baltimore, MD | Active | The third established chapter of Phi Beta Sigma. First D9 fraternity established in Maryland and at Morgan State University. | |
| Alpha Alpha Alpha | February 12, 1931 | Virginia State University | Petersburg, VA | Active | | |
| Alpha Alpha Gamma | 1990 | Lock Haven University of Pennsylvania | Lock Haven, PA | Active | | |
| Alpha Alpha Theta | ? | West Connecticut State University | Danbury, CT | Inactive | | |
| Alpha Alpha Iota | 1993 | Hofstra University | Hempstead, NY | Inactive | | |
| Alpha Alpha Mu | ? | West Virginia Institute of Technology | Montgomery, WV | Inactive | | |
| Alpha Alpha Xi | April 22, 1990 | Binghamton University | Binghamton, NY | Active | | |
| Alpha Alpha Pi | March 30, 1993 | Christopher Newport University | Newport News, VA | Active | First historically Black fraternity on campus | |
| Alpha Alpha Tau | December 6, 1993 | Johnson & Wales University | Providence, RI | Active | | |
| Alpha Alpha Phi | December 30, 1993 | Medgar Evers College | Brooklyn, NY | Active | | |
| Alpha Alpha Psi | May 6, 1994 | Wesley College | Dover, DE | Active | | |
| Alpha Beta Epsilon | March 19, 1999 | Bryant University | Smithfield, RI | Active | | |
| Alpha Beta Upsilon | ? | Sojourner–Douglass College | Baltimore, MD | Defunct | School closed on June 30, 2015 | |
| Alpha Delta | February 25, 1929 | City College of New York at Harlem | Harlem, NY | Active | The first undergraduate chapter of Phi Beta Sigma chartered in New York State | |
| Alpha Delta Alpha | ? | Southeastern University, Washington, D.C. | Washington, D.C. | Defunct | School closed in 2009 | |
| Alpha Zeta Alpha | June 7, 1995 | Slippery Rock University of Pennsylvania | Slippery Rock, PA | Active | | |
| Alpha Eta Alpha | ? | Edinboro University of Pennsylvania | Edinboro, PA | Inactive | | |
| Alpha Theta | 1948 | West Virginia State University | Institute, WV | Inactive | | |
| Alpha Iota | | Bluefield State College | Bluefield, WV | Inactive | | |
| Alpha Mu | April 15, 1935 | University of Maryland Eastern Shore | Princess Anne, MD | Active | First BGLO on campus | |
| Alpha Mu Alpha | February 3, 1996 | Swarthmore College | Swarthmore, PA | Inactive | | |
| Alpha Nu Alpha | April 15, 1996 | Seton Hall University | South Orange, NJ | Active | | |
| Alpha Pi Alpha | March 15, 1996 | Robert Morris University | Moon Township, PA | Inactive | | |
| Alpha Chi Alpha | March 12, 1998 | University of Pennsylvania | Philadelphia, PA | Inactive | Drexel University was previously a part of this charter but is not currently recognized. | |
| Beta Alpha | December 21, 1935 | Boston Citywide | Boston, MA | Active | | |
| Beta Beta Delta | ? | Richard Stockton College | Galloway Township, NJ | Inactive | | |
| Beta Beta Theta | April 23, 2004 | American University | Washington, D.C. | Inactive | | |
| Beta Beta Nu | April 1, 2005 | Washington & Lee University | Lexington, VA | Active | | |
| Beta Beta Pi | March 15, 2006 | SUNY Oneonta | Oneonta, NY | Active | | |
| Beta Beta Upsilon | March 15, 2006 | West Point, NY | West Point, NY | Inactive | | |
| Beta Beta Chi | September 1, 2007 | Wesleyan University | Middletown, CT | Inactive | | |
| Beta Beta Psi | December 27, 2007 | University of Massachusetts Amherst | Amherst, MA | Inactive | | |
| Beta Gamma | February 19, 1947 | Hampton University | Hampton, VA | Active | | |
| Beta Iota | December 3, 1947 | Buffalo Citywide | Buffalo, NY | Active | Comprises Buffalo State College, Canisius College, the University at Buffalo, and Daemen College | |
| Beta Lambda | February 14, 1948 | Brooklyn College | Brooklyn, NY | Active | | |
| Gamma Alpha Alpha | February 29, 2008 | College of William & Mary | Williamsburg, VA | Active | | |
| Gamma Alpha Xi | December 15, 2010 | American International College | Springfield, MA | Active | | |
| Gamma Alpha Rho | April 12, 2011 | Shippensburg University of Pennsylvania | Shippensburg, PA | Inactive | | |
| Gamma Alpha Tau | November 15, 2011 | University of New Haven | West Haven, CT | Active | | |
| Gamma Alpha Phi | March 2, 2012 | The George Washington University | Washington, D.C. | Active | | |
| Gamma Alpha Psi | November 19, 2011 | Pennsylvania State University Harrisburg | Middletown, PA | Inactive | | |
| Gamma Beta Alpha | March 30, 2008 | Susquehanna University | Selinsgrove, PA | Active | | |
| Gamma Delta Gamma | March 14, 2014 | Widener University | Chester, PA | Active | | |
| Gamma Nu Gamma | November 29, 2016 | Rider University | Lawrence Township, NJ | Active | Originally known as the Xi Pi chapter | |
| Gamma Sigma Gamma | February 3, 2018 | Plattsburgh State University of New York | Plattsburgh, NY | Active | | |
| Gamma Lambda | January 16, 1951 | University of the District of Columbia | Washington, D.C. | Active | | |
| Gamma Omicron | March 29, 1959 | Cheyney University of Pennsylvania | Chester County, PA | Active | | |
| Gamma Rho Epsilon | February 23, 2019 | University of Massachusetts-Dartmouth | Dartmouth, MA | Active | | |
| Gamma Rho Theta | February 23, 2019 | Stevenson University | Baltimore County, MD | Active | | |
| Gamma Rho Omicron | December 21, 2022 | Gannon University | Erie, PA | Inactive | | |
| Gamma Upsilon | April 17, 1962 | Delaware State University | Dover, DE | Active | | |
| Gamma Sigma Gamma | February 3, 2018 | Plattsburgh State University of New York | Plattsburgh, NY | Active | | |
| Delta Delta | April 1, 1966 | Coppin State University | Baltimore, MD | Active | | |
| Delta Zeta | May 7, 1972 | Norfolk State University | Norfolk, VA | Active | | |
| Delta Iota | May 7, 1972 | Virginia College Lynchburg | Lynchburg, VA | Active | | |
| Delta Mu | June 28, 1969 | Bowie State University | Bowie, MD | Active | | |
| Delta Xi | January 4, 1969 | York College | Queens, NY | Active | | |
| Delta Upsilon | August 20, 1970 | Virginia Commonwealth University | Richmond, VA | Active | | |
| Delta Psi | ? | Baltimore Citywide | Baltimore, MD | Inactive | | |
| Epsilon | December 19, 1919 | Temple University | Philadelphia, PA | Active | | |
| Epsilon Kappa | February 6, 1972 | University of Pittsburgh | Pittsburgh | Active | | |
| Epsilon Psi | January 25, 1972 | University of Maryland | Prince George's County, MD | Active | | |
| Zeta Eta | April 17, 1974 | University of Virginia | Charlottesville, VA | Active | | |
| Zeta Lambda | June 25, 1974 | University of Connecticut | Storrs, CT | Active | | |
| Zeta Upsilon | March 3, 1975 | University of Maryland, Baltimore County | Baltimore County, MD | Active | | |
| Zeta Chi | ? | Boston University | Boston, MA | Active | | |
| Theta Gamma | March 20, 1976 | NYC Metro Area | New York City, NY | Active | | |
| Theta Kappa | November 14, 1975 | Salisbury University | Salisbury, MD | Active | | |
| Theta Lambda | 1976 | Pace University | Manhattan, NY | Active | | |
| Theta Xi | April 18, 1977 | Syracuse University | Syracuse, NY | Active | | |
| Theta Omicron | January 1, 1977 | Towson University | Baltimore County, MD | Active | | |
| Theta Tau | ? | Montgomery College | Montgomery County, MD | Inactive | | |
| Theta Phi | ? | Niagara Citywide | Niagara, NY | Inactive | | |
| Theta Psi | May 15th, 1977 | Rowan University | Glassboro, NJ | Active | The first undergraduate chapter of Phi Beta Sigma chartered in the State of New Jersey | |
| Iota Gamma | October 16, 1977 | Bucknell University | Lewisburg, PA | Active | | |
| Iota Xi | ? | SUNY Geneseo | Geneseo, NY | Inactive | | |
| Iota Omicron | 1978 | Johns Hopkins University | Baltimore, MD | Inactive | | |
| Iota Upsilon | ? | Brown University | Providence, RI | Inactive | | |
| Iota Phi | February 4, 1977 | Rochester Institute of Technology | Rochester, NY | Active | | |
| Kappa Beta | November 14, 1978 | Frostburg State University | Frostburg, MD | Active | | |
| Kappa Epsilon | July 15, 1978 | Montclair State University | Montclair, NJ | Active | | |
| Kappa Eta | April 16, 1978 | University of Delaware | Newark, DE | Active | | |
| Kappa Mu | April 20, 1978 | Mansfield University of Pennsylvania / Bloomsburg University of Pennsylvania | Mansfield, PA / Bloomsburg, PA | Inactive | | |
| Kappa Nu | | Community College of Baltimore County | Baltimore County, MD | Inactive | | |
| Kappa Xi | January 28, 1979 | Cornell University | Ithaca, NY | Active | | |
| Lambda | May 9, 1921 | Virginia Union University | Richmond, VA | Active | | |
| Lambda Lambda | January 28, 1979 | Penn State University | State College, PA | Active | | |
| Lambda Mu | December 1, 1979 | Indiana University of Pennsylvania | Indiana County, PA | Inactive | | |
| Lambda Nu | ? | University of Massachusetts Amherst | Amherst, MA | Inactive | | |
| Lambda Rho | January 20, 1980 | St. John's University | Queens, NY | Inactive | | |
| Lambda Upsilon | May 3, 1980 | West Chester University | West Chester, PA | Active | | |
| Lambda Chi | July 9, 1980 | Bloomfield College | Bloomfield, NJ | Active | | |
| Lambda Phi | April 25, 1980 | SUNY-Old Westbury | Old Westbury, NY | Active | First Sigma chapter in Long Island and first organization chartered at SUNY Old Westbury | |
| Mu | May 11, 1922 | Lincoln University | Chester County, PA | Active | | |
| Mu Alpha | ? | Fitchburg State University | Fitchburg, MA | Inactive | | |
| Mu Beta | ? | Central Connecticut State University | New Britain, CT | Inactive | | |
| Mu Delta | May 16, 1980 | Stony Brook University | Stony Brook, NY | Active | First GLO on campus | |
| Mu Zeta | May 2, 1980 | Rutgers University – New Brunswick | New Brunswick, NJ | Active | | |
| Mu Iota | May 24, 1980 | SUNY-Albany | Albany, NY | Active | | |
| Mu Nu | May 15, 1980 | Virginia Tech University | Blacksburg, VA | Active | | |
| Mu Omicron | | University of Richmond | Henrico County, VA | Inactive | | |
| Mu Pi | February 27, 1981 | Kean University | Union, NJ | Active | | |
| Mu Upsilon | October 27, 1980 | La Salle University | Philadelphia, PA | Active | | |
| Mu Psi | March 2, 1981 | Rutgers–Camden | Camden, NJ | Active | | |
| Nu Eta | February 27, 1981 | William Paterson University | Wayne, NJ | Active | | |
| Nu Kappa | 1981 | Long Island University C.W. Post Campus | Brookville, NY | Inactive | | |
| Nu Lambda | ? | Adelphi University | Garden City, NY | Inactive | | |
| Nu Mu | ? | Allegheny College | Meadville, PA | Inactive | | |
| Nu Rho | ? | SUNY Purchase | Purchase, NY | Inactive | | |
| Nu Psi | ? | Wagner College | Staten Island, NY | Inactive | | |
| Xi Alpha | October 21, 1983 | Baruch College | Manhattan, NY | Inactive | | |
| Xi Epsilon | August 7, 1986 | Long Island University | Brooklyn, NY | Active | | |
| Xi Theta | July 27, 1982 | New Jersey Institute of Technology | Newark, NJ | Active | | |
| Xi Omicron | | Fairleigh Dickinson University | Rutherford, NJ | Inactive | | |
| Xi Pi | April 14, 1979 | The College of New Jersey | Ewing Township, NJ | Active | Also represented Rider University; rechartered there as Gamma Nu Gamma in fall 2016 | |
| Xi Rho | ? | Saint Paul's College | Lawrenceville, VA | Defunct | School closed in 2013 | |
| Xi Tau | March 1983 | Saint Peter's College / Jersey City State College | Jersey City, NJ | Active | | |
| Xi Chi | April 6, 1973 | Millersville University of Pennsylvania | Millersville, PA | Active | | |
| Xi Psi | | State University of New York at Farmingdale | East Farmingdale, NY | Inactive | Chapter formerly at SUNY-Farmingdale | |
| Omicron Alpha | February 14, 1984 | Utica College | Utica, NY | Inactive | | |
| Omicron Gamma | ? | Iona College | New Rochelle, NY | Inactive | | |
| Omicron Delta | 1985 | SUNY-Brockport | Brockport, NY | Inactive | | |
| Omicron Epsilon | December 17, 1983 | SUNY-New Paltz | New Paltz, NY | Inactive | | |
| Omicron Theta | April 4, 1984 | Southern Connecticut State University | New Haven, CT | Active | | |
| Omicron Iota | November 8, 1983 | Old Dominion University | Norfolk, VA | Active | | |
| Omicron Rho | October 10, 1984 | Longwood University | Farmville, VA | Active | | |
| Pi Beta | November 19, 1983 | East Stroudsburg University of Pennsylvania | East Stroudsburg, PA | Active | | |
| Pi Gamma | May 4, 1985 | California University of Pennsylvania | California, PA | Inactive | | |
| Pi Theta | June 10, 1985 | Queens College | Queens, NY | Active | | |
| Pi Nu | March 29, 1986 | James Madison University | Harrisonburg, VA | Active | | |
| Pi Pi | | Clarion University of Pennsylvania | Clarion, PA | Inactive | | |
| Pi Tau | 1986 | New York Institute of Technology | Old Westbury, NY | Inactive | | |
| Rho Zeta | March 15, 1988 | Radford University | Radford, VA | Inactive | | |
| Rho Theta | November 7, 1987 | West Virginia University | Morgantown, WV | Inactive | | |
| Rho Xi | 1987 | SUNY-Oswego | Oswego, NY | Inactive | The first historically Black fraternity on campus. Also the first minority Greek letter organization on campus. | |
| Rho Pi | ? | West Liberty University | West Liberty, WV | Inactive | | |
| Rho Rho | ? | University of Charleston | Charleston, WV | Inactive | | |
| Rho Tau | March 25, 1989 | George Mason University | Fairfax, VA | Active | | |
| Rho Upsilon | ? | Marshall University | Huntington, WV | Inactive | | |

==== Alumni chapters ====
| Name | Charter date and range | Institution | Location | Status | Notes | Ref. |
|---|---|---|---|---|---|---|
| Alpha Sigma | 1919 | | Washington, D.C. | Active | The first established alumni chapter | |
| Alpha Alpha Eta Sigma | February 20, 1994 | | Virginia Beach, VA | Active | | |
| Alpha Kappa Sigma | May 15, 1940 | | Petersburg, VA | Active | Early established chapter | |
| Beta Sigma | 1920 | | Norfolk, VA | Active | Early established chapter | |
| Beta Upsilon Sigma | 1950 | | Monrovia, Liberia | Inactive | | |
| Beta Psi Sigma | February 3, 1952 | | Westchester County, NY | Active | Chartered in White Plains, NY | |
| Gamma Theta Sigma | November 25, 2020 | | Roanoke, VA | Active | | |
| Gamma Lambda Sigma | April 11, 1954 | | Pittsburgh | Active | | |
| Gamma Nu Sigma | 1956 | | Geneva, Switzerland | Inactive | | |
| Gamma Rho Sigma | January 19, 1956 | | Queens, NY & Long Island, NY | Active | | |
| Delta Gamma Sigma | June 4, 1960 | | Dover, DE | Active | | |
| Delta Iota Sigma | April 27, 1962 | | New Haven, CT | Active | | |
| Delta Pi Sigma | April 24, 1964 | | Hartford, CT | Active | | |
| Delta Sigma Sigma | October 21, 1964 | | Chester, PA | Active | | |
| Epsilon Alpha Sigma | July 30, 1966 | | St. Thomas, Virgin Islands | Active | | |
| Epsilon Iota Sigma | May 2, 1970 | | St. Croix, Virgin Islands | Active | | |
| Epsilon Nu Sigma | April 19, 1972 | | Baltimore County, MD | Active | | |
| Epsilon Pi Sigma | | | Mercer County, NJ | Inactive | Merged with Zeta Rho Sigma Chapter (Camden County) to form Kappa Upsilon Sigma in 1996 | |
| Epsilon Sigma | May 1, 1920 | | Harlem, NY | Active | | |
| Epsilon Phi Sigma | ? | | Wilmington, DE | Inactive | | |
| Zeta Alpha Sigma | September 27, 1976 | | Columbia, MD | Active | | |
| Zeta Delta Sigma | 1974 | | Hampton, VA | Active | Serving Hampton, VA, Newport News, VA, & Williamsburg, VA | |
| Zeta Kappa Sigma | March 31, 1977 | | Metropolitan Boston | Active | The first alumni chapter in Massachusetts | |
| Zeta Lambda Sigma | ? | | Charleston, WV | Inactive | | |
| Zeta Rho Sigma | 1978 | | Camden County, NJ | Active | Merged with Epsilon Pi Sigma Chapter (Mercer County) to form Kappa Upsilon Sigma Chapter; reactivated in 2003 | |
| Zeta Sigma | September 1, 1922 | | Baltimore, MD | Active | | |
| Zeta Chi Sigma | November 28, 1979 | | Prince George's County, MD & Washington, D.C. metropolitan area | Active | | |
| Zeta Psi Sigma | December 30, 1979 | | Syracuse, NY | Active | | |
| Eta Gamma Sigma | 1984 | | Lagos, Nigeria | Inactive | | |
| Eta Phi Sigma | 1984 | | Jersey City, NJ | Active | | |
| Theta Omicron Sigma | October 13, 1985 | | Harrisburg, PA | Active | | |
| Theta Sigma | 1923 | | Buffalo, NY | Active | Founded by Brother I.L. Scruggs, writer of the fraternity's hymn | |
| Theta Tau Sigma | August 15, 1983 | | Fairfax, VA | Active | Chartered on August 15, 1983 in the Fairfax area of Northern Virginia | |
| Theta Upsilon Sigma | May 4, 1984 | | Rochester, NY | Active | | |
| Theta Phi Sigma | ? | | Charlottesville, VA | Inactive | | |
| Iota Gamma Sigma | February 12, 1985 | | Kaiserslautern, Germany | Active | Cluster groups in Stuttgart, Kaiserslautern and Wiesbaden, Germany | |
| Iota Sigma | 1920 | | Richmond, VA | Active | | |
| Iota Chi Sigma | ? | | Neptune Township, NJ | Active | Serving Monmouth County, NJ & Ocean County, NJ | |
| Kappa Beta Sigma | June 30, 1928 | | Brooklyn, NY | Active | | |
| Kappa Upsilon Sigma | March 18, 1996 | | Burlington County, NJ | Active | Product of merger between Epsilon Pi Sigma Chapter & Zeta Rho Sigma Chapter (Camden and Gloucester counties) | |
| Lambda Delta Sigma | March 24, 2000 | | Bear, DE | Active | Serving New Castle County, DE | |
| Lambda Lambda Sigma | November 27, 2001 | | Trenton, New Jersey | Active | | |
| Mu Delta Sigma | May 2, 2003 | | Suffolk County, NY & Nassau County, NY (Long Island, NY) | Active | | |
| Mu Iota Sigma | 1980 | | Albany, NY | Active | | |
| Nu Sigma | 1922 | | Philadelphia, PA | Active | | |
| Nu Sigma Sigma | January 9, 2007 | | Harford County, MD | Active | | |
| Xi Psi Sigma | June 13, 2008 | | Selinsgrove, PA | Active | | |
| Omicron Delta Sigma | October 29, 2009 | | Southern Maryland | Active | Serving Charles, St. Mary's and Calvert counties | |
| Omicron Zeta Sigma | November 1, 2009 | | Prince William County, VA | Active | | |
| Omicron Xi Sigma | June 8, 2011 | | Salisbury, MD | Active | | |
| Omicron Chi Sigma | January 31, 2013 | | Suffolk County, MA | Active | | |
| Omicron Psi Sigma | March 8, 2013 | | Cecil County, MD | Active | Serves the Upper Chesapeake Region of Maryland | |
| Pi Beta Sigma | April 15, 1930 | | Providence, RI | Active | Originally chartered in Boston, MA | |
| Pi Gamma Sigma | March 8, 2013 | | Chester County, PA & Montgomery County, PA | Active | | |
| Pi Zeta Sigma | January 9, 2014 | | Anne Arundel County, MD | Active | | |
| Pi Theta Sigma | March 4, 2014 | | New London, CT | Inactive | | |
| Pi Phi Sigma | July 27, 2015 | | Danville, VA | Active | Known as the "River City Sigmas" | |
| Rho Gamma Sigma | December 5, 2015 | | Spring Valley, NY | Active | Serving Rockland County, NY | |
| Rho Delta Sigma | January 15, 2016 | | Washington Township, NJ | Active | Chartered in Gloucester County, NJ | |
| Rho Epsilon Sigma | January 15, 2016 | | Manhattan, NY | Active | | |
| Rho Zeta Sigma | January 15, 2016 | | Fredericksburg, VA | Active | | |
| Rho Kappa Sigma | March 14, 2016 | | Loudoun County, VA | Active | | |
| Rho Lambda Sigma | March 12, 2016 | | Watertown, NY | Active | Serving Fort Drum, NY | |
| Sigma Alpha Sigma | September 14, 2018 | | Bucks County, PA | Active | | |
| Sigma Mu Sigma | February 29, 2020 | | Accra, Ghana | Active | | |
| Sigma Sigma Sigma | May 3, 1996 | | Montgomery County, Maryland | Active | | |
| Tau Chi Sigma | September 23, 2022 | | The Bronx, NY | Active | | |
| Upsilon Eta Sigma | December 12, 2023 | | London, England | Active | | |
| Upsilon Mu Sigma | July 2, 2024 | | Middlesex County, NJ / Somerset County, NJ | Active | | |
| Upsilon Xi Sigma | July 2, 2024 | | Suffolk, VA | Active | | |
| Upsilon Chi Sigma | December 12, 2023 | | Chesterfield, VA | Active | | |
| Phi Alpha Sigma | December 15, 2025 | | Frederick, MD | Active | | |
| Phi Delta Sigma | June 15, 2026 | | York County, PA | Active | | |
| Chi Beta Sigma | ? | | Richmond University | Inactive | | |
| Chi Sigma | 1923 | | Northern New Jersey | Active | Originally chartered in Newark, NJ | |

=== Great Lakes ===
The states that make up the Great Lakes Region are: Illinois, Indiana, Iowa, Kentucky, Michigan, Minnesota, Ohio, and Wisconsin, along with an international chapter in Canada.

==== Collegiate chapters ====
| Name | Charter date and range | Institution | Location | Status | Notes | Ref. |
|---|---|---|---|---|---|---|
| Alpha Alpha | April 19, 1927 | Wilberforce University | Wilberforce, OH | Active | | |
| Alpha Alpha Beta | 1939 | Chicago State University | Chicago, IL | Active | | |
| Alpha Alpha Kappa | 1993 | University of Northern Iowa | Waterloo, IA | Inactive | | |
| Alpha Alpha Nu | March 22, 1993 | Morehead State University | Morehead, KY | Inactive | | |
| Alpha Beta Kappa | April 24, 2000 | Miami University | Oxford, OH | Active | | |
| Alpha Beta Mu | February 4, 2000 | Wright State University | Dayton, OH | Inactive | First BGLO on campus with members on the campus | |
| Alpha Beta Omicron | February 15, 2000 | Elmhurst College | Elmhurst, IL | Inactive | | |
| Alpha Beta Rho | April 28, 2000 | Northern Kentucky University | Highland Heights, KY | Active | | |
| Alpha Beta Phi | ? | Michigan Technological University | Houghton, MI | Inactive | | |
| Alpha Beta Chi | ? | Davenport University | Grand Rapids, MI | Inactive | | |
| Alpha Epsilon Alpha | April 15, 1995 | Indianapolis Citywide | Indianapolis, IN | Active | This chapter includes Indiana University Indianapolis, Purdue University in Indianapolis, and Butler University. | |
| Alpha Rho Alpha | August 25, 1997 | Indiana University Northwest | Gary, IN | Inactive | | |
| Beta Beta Xi | April 18, 2005 | Metro Louisville | Louisville, KY | Active | | |
| Beta Nu | March 1947 | Cleveland State University | Cleveland, OH | Active | | |
| Gamma Alpha Iota | September 14, 2009 | Xavier University | Cincinnati, OH | Active | | |
| Gamma Alpha Omicron | December 3, 2010 | Winona State University | Winona, MN | Inactive | | |
| Gamma Eta Gamma | December 4, 2014 | Quincy University | Quincy, IL | Inactive | | |
| Gamma Iota | November 13, 1950 | Wayne State University | Detroit, MI | Active | The first undergraduate chapter in Michigan | |
| Gamma Omicron Gamma | May 18, 2017 | St. Cloud State University | St. Paul, MN | Inactive | | |
| Gamma Pi Gamma | September 10, 2017 | Lake Forest College | Lake Forest, IL | Active | | |
| Gamma Rho Eta | February 23, 2019 | McKendree University | Lebanon, IL | Active | | |
| Delta Kappa | January 16, 1967 | Michigan State University | East Lansing, MI | Active | | |
| Delta Omicron | May 8, 1969 | Ohio State University | Columbus, OH | Active | | |
| Delta Rho | April 17, 1970 | University of Michigan | Ann Arbor, MI | Active | | |
| Delta Tau | August 10, 1967 | Southern Illinois University-Carbondale | Carbondale, IL | Active | Reactivated in fall 2019 | |
| Delta Chi | May 22, 1970 | Eastern Illinois University | Charleston, IL | Active | Reactivated in fall 2020 | |
| Epsilon Gamma | May 1, 1970 | Northern Illinois University | DeKalb, IL | Active | | |
| Epsilon Epsilon | November 12, 1971 | Kent State University | Kent, OH | Active | | |
| Epsilon Theta | December 4, 1971 | Western Kentucky University | Bowling Green, KY | Active | Colony: December 4, 1971. Charter certification by Past Great Lakes Regional Director Frank W. Brown on April 27, 1972 and past National President Parlett L. Moore on April 29, 1972. | |
| Epsilon Iota | January 3, 1972 | Indiana University | Bloomington, IN | Active | The first collegiate chapter in the state of Indiana | |
| Epsilon Mu | April 13, 1972 | University of Michigan-Flint | Flint, MI | Active | First BGLO on campus. Reactivated on April 1, 2011. | |
| Epsilon Xi | May 19, 1972 | University of Illinois | Champaign, IL | Active | Reactivated in fall 2019 | |
| Epsilon Omicron | May 20, 1972 | Ohio University | Athens, OH | Active | | |
| Epsilon Pi | August 15, 1972 | Southern Illinois University-Edwardsville | Edwardsville, IL | Active | | |
| Epsilon Phi | April 8, 1973 | Bowling Green State University | Bowling Green, OH | Active | | |
| Epsilon Chi | January 26, 1973 | Illinois State University | Normal, IL | Active | | |
| Zeta Delta | March 2, 1974 | Western Michigan University | Kalamazoo, MI | Active | | |
| Zeta Epsilon | 1973 | Eastern Michigan University | Ypsilanti, MI | Active | | |
| Zeta Theta | April 6, 1974 | Ferris State University | Big Rapids, MI | Active | | |
| Zeta Mu | August 26, 1974 | Bradley University | Peoria, IL | Active | | |
| Zeta Phi | January 18, 1975 | Purdue University | West Lafayette, IN | Active | | |
| Zeta Psi | January 18, 1975 | Indiana State University | Terre Haute, IN | Inactive | | |
| Theta Beta | March 11, 1976 | University of Wisconsin at Whitewater | Whitewater, WI | Active | | |
| Theta Epsilon | March 29, 1976 | Monmouth College | Monmouth, IL | Inactive | | |
| Theta Mu | September 17, 1976 | Milwaukee Citywide | Milwaukee, WI | Active | Chartered at the Milwaukee School of Engineering | |
| Iota Alpha | January 9, 1931 | University of Illinois at Chicago | Chicago, IL | Inactive | The first collegiate chapter in the state of Illinois | |
| Iota Beta | September 17, 1977 | University of Akron | Akron, OH | Active | | |
| Iota Delta | March 24, 1977 | Eastern Kentucky University | Richmond, KY | Active | | |
| Iota Epsilon | May 18, 1977 | Saginaw Valley State University | University Center, MI | Active | Reactivated November 19, 2022 | |
| Iota Eta | May 17, 1978 | Lewis University | Romeoville, IL | Inactive | | |
| Iota Theta | March 6, 1978 | University of Dayton | Dayton, OH | Active | Was a joint chapter for Wright State University and the University of Dayton from spring 1982 to February 4, 2000 | |
| Iota Nu | May 1, 1978 | Northwestern University | Evanston, IL | Active | | |
| Iota Chi | May 5, 1978 | Western Illinois University | Macomb, IL | Active | Reactivated in summer 2022 | |
| Kappa Gamma | September 5, 1978 | Iowa State University | Ames, IA | Active | | |
| Kappa Theta | October 28, 1978 | Northwood University | Midland, MI | Inactive | | |
| Kappa Pi | 1979 | University of Evansville | Evansville, IN | Inactive | | |
| Kappa Rho | May 23, 1979 | University of Wisconsin–Madison | Madison, WI | Active | | |
| Kappa Psi | May 5, 1979 | University of Iowa at Iowa City | Iowa City, IA | Inactive | | |
| Lambda Beta | April 20, 1979 | Ball State University | Muncie, IN | Active | | |
| Lambda Gamma | May 18, 1979 | Central Michigan University | Mount Pleasant, MI | Active | | |
| Lambda Delta | 1979 | University of Wisconsin–La Crosse | La Crosse, WI | Inactive | | |
| Lambda Epsilon | June 7, 1981 | University of Toledo | Toledo, OH | Active | | |
| Lambda Theta | 1978 | University of Cincinnati | Cincinnati, OH | Active | | |
| Lambda Omicron | April 21, 1980 | Illinois Wesleyan University | Bloomington, IL | Inactive | | |
| Mu Eta | August 2, 1980 | University of Illinois Springfield | Springfield, IL | Active | | |
| Mu Theta | September 16, 1980 | University of Kentucky | Lexington, KY | Active | | |
| Nu | March 15, 1947 | Central State University | Wilberforce, OH | Active | | |
| Nu Gamma | April 24, 1981 | Grand Valley State University | Allendale, MI | Active | | |
| Nu Epsilon | ? | Capital University | Bexley, OH | Inactive | | |
| Nu Nu | April 5, 1981 | Lawrence Technological University | Southfield, MI | Active | | |
| Xi Lambda | February 13, 1935 | Kentucky State University | Frankfort, KY | Active | | |
| Omicron Xi | September 15, 1982 | Murray State University | Murray, KY | Active | Reactivated in 1988 | |
| Omicron Omicron | March 3, 1983 | Oakland University | Rochester, MI | Active | | |
| Omicron Upsilon | 1984 | Vincennes University | Vincennes, IN | Inactive | | |
| Pi Eta | March 15, 1985 | University of Minnesota-Twin Cities | Minneapolis/St. Paul, MN | Active | | |
| Pi Omicron | 1986 | Aurora University | Aurora, IL | Inactive | | |
| Pi Upsilon | June 10, 1984 | University of Wisconsin at Oshkosh | Oshkosh, WI | Active | | |
| Rho Kappa | April 15, 1988 | University of Dubuque | Dubuque, IA | Inactive | | |
| Rho Nu | February 27, 1988 | University of Detroit Mercy | Detroit, MI | Active | | |
| Rho Omicron | | Indiana University–Purdue University Fort Wayne | Fort Wayne, IN | Deactivated | School split into Indiana University Fort Wayne & Purdue University Fort Wayne in 2018. | |
| Tau | April 25, 1925 | University of Louisville | Louisville, KY | Active | Reactivated in 1982 | |

==== Alumni chapters ====
| Name | Charter date and range | Institution | Location | Status | Notes | Ref. |
|---|---|---|---|---|---|---|
| Alpha Alpha Beta Sigma | 1991 | | Detroit, MI | Active | | |
| Alpha Rho Sigma | | | Grand Rapids, MI | Active | | |
| Beta Xi Sigma | May 20, 1949 | | Dayton, OH | Active | Oldest alumni chapter in the State of Ohio and 3rd oldest in the Great Lakes Region | |
| Beta Omicron Sigma | June 4, 1949 | | Columbus, OH | Active | | |
| Beta Phi Sigma | ? | | Toledo, OH | Active | Known as the "Glass City Sigmas" | |
| Gamma Alpha Sigma | May 9, 1951 | | Cleveland, OH | Active | | |
| Delta Theta Sigma | February 1, 1962 | | Cincinnati, OH | Active | | |
| Delta Xi Sigma | March 19, 1963 | | Milwaukee, WI | Active | | |
| Delta Rho Sigma | September 1, 1964 | | Akron, OH | Active | | |
| Epsilon Beta Sigma | August 27, 1927 | | Louisville, KY | Active | | |
| Epsilon Zeta Sigma | August 26, 1968 | | Merrillville, IN | Active | | |
| Epsilon Eta Sigma | August 14, 1967 | | Kankakee, IL | Active | | |
| Epsilon Lambda Sigma | May 2, 1971 | | East St. Louis, IL | Active | | |
| Epsilon Mu Sigma | May 20, 1971 | | Champaign, IL | Active | Serving the Champaign-Urbana metropolitan area | |
| Epsilon Rho Sigma | May 12, 1975 | | Peoria, IL | Active | | |
| Epsilon Tau Sigma | | | Lansing, MI | Active | | |
| Epsilon Upsilon Sigma | December 29, 1975 | | Aurora, IL | Active | This chapter covers the western suburbs of Chicago including Aurora, Naperville, and Downers Grove. | |
| Epsilon Chi Sigma | April 30, 1976 | | Chicago, IL | Active | | |
| Zeta Gamma Sigma | November 8, 1976 | | Saginaw, MI | Active | | |
| Zeta Zeta Sigma | April 10, 1991 | | Davenport, IA | Active | Known as the "Quad City Sigmas" | |
| Zeta Eta Sigma | August 21, 1977 | | Fort Wayne, IN | Active | | |
| Zeta Nu Sigma | September 27, 1977 | | St. Paul, MN | Active | Serving the Minneapolis-Saint Paul metropolitan area | |
| Zeta Tau Sigma | 2023 | | Canton, MI | Active | | |
| Eta Alpha Sigma | March 30, 1980 | | Lexington, KY | Active | Serving the Lexington & Frankfort areas | |
| Eta Epsilon Sigma | October 22, 1979 | | Des Moines, IA | Active | | |
| Eta Psi Sigma | July 27, 1981 | | Springfield, IL | Active | | |
| Iota Beta Sigma | ? | | Flint, MI | Active | | |
| Iota Nu Sigma | November 10, 1983 | | Chicago, IL | Active | | |
| Iota Phi Sigma | July 21, 1987 | | Chicago, IL | Active | | |
| Kappa Theta Sigma | January 9, 1989 | | Terre Haute, IN | Active | | |
| Kappa Mu Sigma | May 25, 1989 | | Bloomington, IL | Active | | |
| Kappa Rho Sigma | April 8, 1994 | | Madison, WI | Active | | |
| Nu Alpha Sigma | March 28, 2002 | | Detroit, MI | Active | | |
| Nu Gamma Sigma | May 21, 2002 | | Belleville, IL | Active | | |
| Nu Delta Sigma | March 20, 2003 | | Milwaukee, WI | Active | | |
| Nu Zeta Sigma | October 13, 2003 | | Indianapolis, IN | Active | | |
| Nu Kappa Sigma | January 17, 2005 | | DeKalb, IL | Active | | |
| Nu Lambda Sigma | February 26, 2005 | | Lake County, IL | Active | | |
| Nu Pi Sigma | September 16, 2006 | | Rockford, IL | Active | | |
| Nu Upsilon Sigma | March 17, 2007 | | South Bend, IN | Active | | |
| Nu Phi Sigma | April 22, 2007 | | Dayton, OH | Active | | |
| Xi Sigma | December 14, 1938 | | Indianapolis, IN | Active | Oldest and largest alumni chapter in the state of Indiana | |
| Xi Beta Sigma | June 22, 1940 | | Detroit, MI | Active | | |
| Omicron Alpha Sigma | April 4, 2009 | | Matteson, IL | Active | | |
| Omicron Epsilon Sigma | November 7, 2009 | | Carbondale, IL | Active | Youngest alumni chapter membership in the state of Illinois | |
| Omicron Eta Sigma | December 7, 2009 | | Bowling Green, KY | Active | | |
| Omicron Nu Sigma | June 11, 2011 | | Bloomington, IN | Active | | |
| Pi Lambda Sigma | April 18, 2014 | | Kalamazoo, MI | Active | | |
| Pi Rho Sigma | February 4, 1988 | | Ann Arbor, MI | Active | | |
| Pi Psi Sigma | November 14, 2015 | | Chicago, IL | Active | | |
| Rho Eta Sigma | 2016 | | Dubuque, IA | Active | | |
| Rho Chi Sigma | February 23, 2018 | | Westerville, OH | Active | Serving Central Ohio | |
| Sigma Omicron Sigma | June 22, 2019 | | Toronto, Canada | Active | First chapter in Canada | |
| Tau Delta Sigma | November 2, 2020 | | Decatur, IL | Active | | |
| Tau Nu Sigma | January 13, 2023 | | Westchester, IL | Active | Serving the western suburbs of Chicago: Aurora, IL, Wheaton, IL, Lombard, IL, Naperville, IL, Darien, IL, Willowbrook, IL, Westmont, IL, Bellwood, IL, Maywood, IL, & Downers Grove, IL | |
| Tau Xi Sigma | January 13, 2023 | | Bolingbrook, IL | Active | Serving the southwestern suburbs of Chicago | |
| Tau Rho Sigma | June 12, 2023 | | Youngstown, OH | Active | | |
| Tau Psi Sigma | October 14, 2023 | | Waterloo, IA | Active | | |
| Upsilon Sigma | September 11, 1927 | | Chicago, IL | Active | First alumni chapter in the state of Illinois | |
| Upsilon Epsilon Sigma | October 14, 2023 | | Murray, KY | Active | Serving the Murray, Mayfield, & Paducah areas | |
| Upsilon Lambda Sigma | April 17, 2024 | | Springfield, OH | Active | Known as the "Champion City Sigmas" | |
| Upsilon Nu Sigma | March 8, 2024 | | North Cook County, IL | Active | Serving the Evanston & Northshore communities | |
| Upsilon Rho Sigma | December 16, 2024 | | Radcliff, KY | Active | Previously known as the military chapter designation Alpha Omega Sigma, Fort Knox Chapter. Serving Fort Knox, KY. | |

=== Gulf Coast ===
The states that make up the Gulf Coast Region are: Louisiana, New Mexico and Texas.

==== Collegiate chapters ====
| Name | Charter date and range | Institution | Location | Status | Notes | Ref. |
|---|---|---|---|---|---|---|
| Alpha Beta Pi | | New Mexico State University | Las Cruces, NM | Inactive | | |
| Alpha Kappa | | Tillotson College | Austin, TX | Defunct | School merged with Samuel Huston College to become Huston-Tillotson College in 1952 | |
| Alpha Lambda | July 24, 1940 | Xavier University of Louisiana | New Orleans, LA | Active | | |
| Alpha Lambda Alpha | November 16, 1996 | Texas A&M University | College Station, TX | Active | | |
| Beta | November 13, 1915 | Wiley College | Marshall, TX | Active | The second established chapter of Phi Beta Sigma. First D9 fraternity established west of the Mississippi River. | |
| Beta Beta Mu | December 18, 2004 | Texas Christian University | Fort Worth, TX | Inactive | | |
| Beta Beta Omicron | February 4, 2006 | University of Texas at San Antonio | San Antonio, TX | Inactive | | |
| Beta Delta | March 13, 1945 | Texas Southern University | Houston, TX | Active | | |
| Beta Phi | January 19, 1949 | Texas College | Tyler, TX | Active | | |
| Gamma Alpha Kappa | July 9, 2009 | Texas Women's University | Denton, TX | Active | In 1994, the school became coeducational. | |
| Gamma Alpha Nu | November 13, 2010 | New Mexico Highlands University | Las Vegas, NM | Inactive | | |
| Gamma Zeta Gamma | August 13, 2014 | University of New Mexico | Albuquerque, NM | Active | | |
| Gamma Kappa | 1951 | Paul Quinn College | Dallas, TX | Active | | |
| Gamma Kappa Gamma | March 28, 2015 | Tarleton State University | Stephenville, TX | Active | | |
| Gamma Mu | | Bishop College | Marshall, TX | Defunct | School closed in 1988 | |
| Gamma Xi Gamma | April 19, 2017 | University of North Texas at Dallas | Dallas, TX | Active | | |
| Delta Eta | November 5, 1966 | Southern University at New Orleans | New Orleans, LA | Active | | |
| Delta Theta | August 14, 1966 | Prairie View A&M University | Prairie View, TX | Active | Reactivated in 2016 | |
| Epsilon Alpha | March 9, 1937 | Dillard University | New Orleans, LA | Active | | |
| Epsilon Zeta | 1971 | Jarvis Christian College | Hawkins, TX | Active | | |
| Epsilon Eta | | Southern University at Shreveport | Shreveport, LA | Inactive | | |
| Epsilon Nu | March 17, 1972 | Lamar University | Beaumont, TX | Active | | |
| Epsilon Upsilon | November 18, 1972 | Stephen F. Austin University | Nacogdoches, TX | Active | | |
| Zeta Beta | March 24, 1973 | University of North Texas | Denton, TX | Active | | |
| Zeta Zeta | April 6, 1974 | University of Houston | Houston, TX | Active | | |
| Zeta Iota | November 13, 1973 | Northwestern State University | Natchitoches, LA | Active | | |
| Zeta Rho | | College of the Mainland | Texas City, TX | Inactive | | |
| Eta Zeta | October 13, 1975 | East Texas A&M University | Commerce, TX | Active | | |
| Theta | December 30, 1952 | Huston–Tillotson University | Austin, TX | Active | | |
| Theta Pi | 1976 | Louisiana Tech University | Ruston, LA | Active | | |
| Theta Rho | April 15, 1977 | Sam Houston State University | Huntsville, TX | Active | | |
| Theta Chi | October 31, 1976 | University of Texas at Arlington | Arlington, TX | Active | | |
| Iota Iota | April 14, 1976 | University of Louisiana at Lafayette | Lafayette, LA | Active | | |
| Iota Lambda | March 20, 1978 | University of New Orleans | New Orleans, LA | Inactive | | |
| Iota Tau | October 1, 1976 | Louisiana State University | Baton Rouge, LA | Active | | |
| Kappa Kappa | April 7, 1978 | University of Louisiana at Monroe | Monroe, LA | Active | | |
| Kappa Tau | ? | Southern Methodist University | Dallas, TX | Inactive | | |
| Mu Rho | October 1, 1980 | University of Texas at Austin | Austin, TX | Active | | |
| Nu Alpha | ? | Nicholls State University | Thibodaux, LA | Inactive | | |
| Nu Zeta | October 18, 2000 | Baylor University | Waco, TX | Active | | |
| Nu Omicron | ? | Texas A&M University-Kingsville | Kingsville, TX | Inactive | | |
| Nu Pi | ? | Amarillo College | Amarillo, TX | Inactive | | |
| Xi | January 18, 1954 | Grambling State University | Grambling, LA | Active | | |
| Xi Eta | 1982 | McNeese State University | Lake Charles, LA | Active | | |
| Xi Kappa | March 28, 1983 | University of Houston–Downtown | Houston, TX | Active | | |
| Xi Phi | ? | Southeastern Louisiana University | Hammond, LA | Inactive | | |
| Omicron Nu | November 12, 1982 | Southeastern Louisiana University | Hammond, LA | Active | | |
| Omicron Tau | 1982 | University of Texas at El Paso | El Paso, TX | Inactive | | |
| Omicron Phi | 1984 | Loyola University | New Orleans, LA | Inactive | | |
| Omicron Chi | 1984 | Tulane University | New Orleans, LA | Inactive | | |
| Pi Xi | August 18, 1983 | Texas State University | San Marcos, TX | Active | | |
| Rho | November 5, 1924 | Southern University | Baton Rouge, LA | Active | First NPHC chapter chartered in Louisiana | |
| Tau Theta | 1993 | Texas Tech University | Lubbock, TX | Inactive as of 2019 | | |

==== Alumni chapters ====
| Name | Charter date and range | Institution | Location | Status | Notes | Ref. |
|---|---|---|---|---|---|---|
| Alpha Alpha Sigma | November 18, 1934 | | Beaumont, TX | Active | | |
| Alpha Beta Sigma | February 25, 1934 | | Houston, TX | Active | | |
| Alpha Gamma Sigma | ? | | Marshall, TX | Active | | |
| Alpha Zeta Sigma | January 18, 1947 | | Tyler, TX | Active | | |
| Alpha Theta Sigma | March 4, 1939 | | Fort Worth, TX | Active | | |
| Alpha Xi Sigma | February 8, 1948 | | Shreveport, LA | Active | | |
| Alpha Sigma Sigma | February 21, 1953 | | Prairie View, TX | Active | | |
| Alpha Tau Sigma | ? | | Sherman, TX | Inactive | | |
| Beta Beta Sigma | December 26, 1926 | | San Antonio, TX | Active | | |
| Beta Eta Sigma | 1952 | | Grambling, LA | Active | | |
| Beta Tau Sigma | June 3, 1950 | | Texarkana, TX | Active | The first NPHC chapter in the Texarkana area | |
| Gamma Iota Sigma | February 3, 1955 | | Lake Charles, LA | Active | | |
| Gamma Omicron Sigma | March 27, 1952 | | Waco, TX | Active | | |
| Gamma Tau Sigma | ? | | Amarillo, TX | Inactive | | |
| Delta Chi Sigma | May 3, 1966 | | Alexandria, LA | Active | | |
| Epsilon Kappa Sigma | June 2, 1970 | | La Marque, TX | Active | | |
| Zeta Xi Sigma | August 21, 1978 | | Missouri City, TX | Active | Serving Fort Bend County, TX | |
| Eta Pi Sigma | ? | | Baton Rouge, LA | Inactive | | |
| Eta Rho Sigma | February 12, 1981 | | Huntsville, TX | Active | | |
| Theta Beta Sigma | 1928 | | New Orleans, LA | Active | | |
| Theta Delta Sigma | April 7, 1982 | | Killeen, TX | Active | Serving Fort Hood, TX (Phantom Warrior Chapter) | |
| Theta Theta Sigma | April 19, 1982 | | El Paso, TX | Active | | |
| Theta Mu Sigma | October 11, 1983 | | Dallas, TX | Active | | |
| Theta Pi Sigma | ? | | Monroe, LA | Active | | |
| Theta Psi Sigma | ? | | Longview, TX | Inactive | | |
| Iota Epsilon Sigma | ? | | Opelousas, LA | Inactive | | |
| Iota Mu Sigma | December 1, 1986 | | Arlington, TX | Active | | |
| Iota Xi Sigma | 1986 | | Lafayette, LA | Active | | |
| Iota Sigma Sigma | ? | | Leesville, LA | Inactive | | |
| Iota Upsilon Sigma | ? | | Many, LA | Inactive | | |
| Kappa Psi Sigma | February 3, 1999 | | Hammond, LA | Active | | |
| Nu Nu Sigma | February 25, 2006 | | Albuquerque, NM | Active | | |
| Omicron Beta Sigma | April 20, 1931 | | Baton Rouge, LA | Active | | |
| Omicron Sigma | December 1, 1933 | | Lewisville, TX | Active | Serving the North Dallas area | |
| Omicron Sigma Sigma | March 26, 2012 | | Nacogdoches, TX | Active | | |
| Pi Nu Sigma | ? | | Las Cruces, NM | Inactive | | |
| Sigma Theta Sigma | June 11, 2019 | | The Woodlands, TX | Active | | |
| Sigma Kappa Sigma | December 12, 2019 | | Round Rock, TX | Active | | |
| Tau Zeta Sigma | August 24, 2022 | | Collin County, TX | Active | | |
| Upsilon Gamma Sigma | October 14, 2023 | | Temple, TX / Belton, TX | Active | | |
| Upsilon Pi Sigma | November 9, 2024 | | Gretna, LA | Active | Serving Jefferson Parish, LA | |
| Upsilon Upsilon Sigma | January 21, 2025 | | Thibodaux, LA | Active | Known as the "Bayou Sigmas"; Serving Lafourche, Terrebonne, Assumption, & St. Mary parishes | |
| Psi Beta Sigma | July 19, 1931 | | Austin, TX | Active | | |

=== Southeastern ===
The states that make up the Southeastern Region are: North Carolina, South Carolina and all of Tennessee east of the 86th Longitude.

==== Collegiate chapters ====
| Name | Charter date and range | Institution | Location | Status | Notes | Ref. |
|---|---|---|---|---|---|---|
| Alpha Alpha Rho | May 1, 1992 | Appalachian State University | Boone, NC | Active | Chapter was reactivated in 2009. | |
| Alpha Alpha Chi | October 24, 1993 | Duke University | Durham, NC | Active | | |
| Alpha Beta Beta | July 31, 1999 | Elon University | Elon, NC | Active | | |
| Alpha Beta Zeta | April 1, 1999 | Wingate University | Wingate, NC | Inactive | | |
| Alpha Beta Lambda | October 19, 1999 | North Carolina Wesleyan College | Rocky Mount, NC | Inactive | First BGLO on campus | |
| Alpha Beta Xi | December 21, 1999 | Tennessee Tech University | Cookeville, TN | Inactive | | |
| Alpha Beta Psi | June 19, 2001 | Newberry College | Newberry, SC | Active | | |
| Alpha Epsilon | May 22, 1929 | Johnson C. Smith University | Charlotte, NC | Active | | |
| Alpha Xi Alpha | April 1, 1996 | East Tennessee State University | Johnson City, TN | Active | | |
| Alpha Omicron | December 7, 1935 | Allen University | Columbia, SC | Active | | |
| Alpha Tau Alpha | November 20, 1997 | Lander University | Greenwood, SC | Inactive | | |
| Alpha Upsilon Alpha | April 26, 1997 | Barton College | Wilson, NC | Inactive | | |
| Beta Beta Zeta | 2002 | Lenoir Rhyne University | Hickory, NC | Inactive | First BGLO on campus. | |
| Beta Beta Iota | October 22, 2004 | Coastal Carolina University | Myrtle Beach, SC | Active | | |
| Beta Eta | 1947 | Knoxville College | Knoxville, TN | Inactive | | |
| Beta Xi | February 28, 1948 | St. Augustine's University | Raleigh, NC | Inactive | First BGLO on campus. Responsible for the university's school colors of royal blue and pure white. Chapter has never been suspended for any reason by organization. The only BGLO to never be suspended on the university's campus. Home of the 30th international past president of the fraternity: Hon. Peter Adams Esq. 1997–2001. | |
| Gamma Alpha Gamma | November 9, 2007 | University of South Carolina Upstate | Spartanburg, SC | Active | First NPHC fraternity chartered on campus | |
| Gamma Gamma | May 9, 1949 | North Carolina Central University | Durham, NC | Active | | |
| Gamma Lambda Gamma | March 6, 2016 | Benedict College | Columbia, SC | Active | Formerly the Beta Mu chapter | |
| Gamma Rho | March 28, 1961 | Elizabeth City State University | Elizabeth City, NC | Active | | |
| Gamma Rho Pi | February 21, 2023 | High Point University | High Point, NC | Active | | |
| Gamma Rho Rho | August 10, 2026 | Wake Forest University | Winston-Salem, NC | Active | | |
| Gamma Tau Gamma | February 23, 2018 | Campbell University | Buies Creek, NC | Inactive | | |
| Delta Alpha | April 24, 1932 | Winston-Salem State University | Winston-Salem, NC | Active | First BGLO on campus. In 1997, it was named "International Collegiate Chapter of the Year" at the Conclave in Orlando, Florida. | |
| Zeta Gamma | November 9, 1973 | Voorhees College | Denmark, SC | Active | | |
| Eta | 1919 | North Carolina Agricultural and Technical State University | Greensboro, NC | Active | First BGLO on campus | |
| Eta Alpha | April 27, 1937 | South Carolina State University | Orangeburg, SC | Active | | |
| Eta Delta | ? | Furman University | Greenville, SC | Inactive | | |
| Iota | December 11, 1919 | Shaw University | Raleigh, NC | Active | The ninth oldest chapter and first BGLO on campus | |
| Iota Zeta | December 1977 | Morris College | Sumter, SC | Inactive | 1st BGLO on campus | |
| Kappa Iota | November 10, 1978 | University of South Carolina | Columbia, SC | Active | | |
| Kappa Phi | ? | Coker College | Hartsville, SC | Inactive | | |
| Kappa Chi | January 18, 1979 | The University of Tennessee | Knoxville, TN | Active | | |
| Lambda Psi | May 15, 1980 | College of Charleston | Charleston, SC | Active | | |
| Nu Theta | 2001 | Presbyterian College | Clinton, SC | Inactive | Chapter was reactivated in spring 2001. | |
| Nu Iota | December 7, 1980 | University of North Carolina at Pembroke | Pembroke, NC | Active | First BGLO chartered on campus | |
| Nu Chi | November 20, 1987 | Winthrop University | Rock Hill, SC | Active | | |
| Xi Gamma | April 23, 1982 | University of North Carolina | Chapel Hill, NC | Active | | |
| Xi Zeta | April 15, 1982 | North Carolina State University | Raleigh, NC | Active | | |
| Xi Nu | January 29, 1983 | East Carolina University | Greenville, NC | Active | | |
| Xi Xi | ? | Barber-Scotia College | Concord, NC | Inactive | | |
| Xi Upsilon | March 25, 1983 | University of Tennessee at Chattanooga | Chattanooga, TN | Active | | |
| Omicron | December 11, 1923 | Claflin University | Orangeburg, SC | Active | 1st BGLO chartered in South Carolina | |
| Omicron Kappa | ? | University of South Carolina at Sumter | Sumter, SC | Inactive | | |
| Omicron Lambda | April 27, 1984 | Clemson University | Clemson, SC | Active | | |
| Pi | October 20, 1954 | Fayetteville State University | Fayetteville, NC | Active | | |
| Pi Iota | 1985 | Charleston Southern University | North Charleston, SC | Inactive | | |
| Pi Mu | November 26, 1986 | Western Carolina University | Cullowhee, NC | Active | | |
| Pi Chi | 1987 | Francis Marion University | Florence, SC | Deactivated | | |
| Rho Beta | February 12, 1988 | UNC-Greensboro | Greensboro, NC | Active | | |
| Rho Gamma | March 14, 1988 | University of North Carolina at Charlotte | Charlotte, NC | Active | | |
| Rho Epsilon | April 23, 1988 | UNC-Wilmington | Wilmington, NC | Inactive | | |
| Upsilon | May 18, 1925 | Livingstone College | Salisbury, NC | Active | | |

==== Alumni chapters ====
| Name | Charter date and range | Institution | Location | Status | Notes | Ref. |
|---|---|---|---|---|---|---|
| Alpha Alpha Alpha Sigma | ? | | Rocky Mount, NC | Active | | |
| Alpha Alpha Gamma Sigma | September 9, 2010 | | Spring Lake, NC | Active | | |
| Alpha Alpha Delta Sigma | 1992 | | Boone, NC | Inactive | | |
| Alpha Lambda Sigma | February 19, 1945 | | Greenville, SC | Active | | |
| Alpha Omicron Sigma | ? | | Lumberton, NC | Inactive | | |
| Alpha Upsilon Sigma | ? | | Elizabeth City, NC | Active | | |
| Alpha Psi Sigma | 1948 | | Asheville, NC | Inactive | Also known as the Sigmas of Western North Carolina | |
| Beta Alpha Sigma | ? | | Marion, SC | Inactive | | |
| Beta Theta Sigma | March 23, 1953 | | Florence, SC | Active | | |
| Beta Kappa Sigma | June 21, 1948 | | Kinston, NC | Active | | |
| Beta Mu Sigma | November 2, 1948 | | Charleston, SC | Active | | |
| Beta Rho Sigma | February 2, 1950 | | Charlotte, NC | Active | | |
| Beta Chi Sigma | June 13, 1950 | | Columbia, SC | Active | | |
| Gamma Beta Sigma | 1926 | | Greensboro, NC | Active | | |
| Gamma Kappa Sigma | March 1, 1954 | | Henderson, NC | Active | | |
| Gamma Upsilon Sigma | December 5, 2006 | | Lumberton, NC | Active | | |
| Gamma Chi Sigma | ? | | Fairfax, SC | Inactive | | |
| Delta Sigma | December 10, 1923 | | Winston-Salem, NC | Active | Hosted the 1938 and 1970 Conclaves. 2013 Philadelphia, PA Conclave "International Alumni Chapter of the Year". | |
| Delta Zeta Sigma | January 4, 1961 | | Durham, NC | Active | Known as the Bull City Sigmas | |
| Delta Eta Sigma | ? | | Clinton, NC | Inactive | | |
| Delta Kappa Sigma | March 24, 1946 | | Sumter, SC | Active | Organized by Bro. Dr. John Yeldell, regional director (formally the South Atlantic Region) | |
| Delta Nu Sigma | November 6, 1962 | | Wilmington, NC | Active | | |
| Epsilon Xi Sigma | September 5, 1972 | | Chattanooga, TN | Active | | |
| Zeta Beta Sigma | December 30, 1938 | | Fayetteville, NC | Active | | |
| Zeta Theta Sigma | February 25, 1977 | | Rock Hill, SC | Active | | |
| Eta Sigma | November 13, 1922 | | Raleigh, NC | Active | | |
| Eta Theta Sigma | May 27, 1980 | | Jacksonville, NC | Active | | |
| Eta Iota Sigma | February 19, 1980 | | Georgetown, SC | Active | | |
| Eta Omicron Sigma | May 7, 1946 | | Orangeburg, SC | Active | | |
| Eta Upsilon Sigma | ? | | Timmonsville, SC | Inactive | | |
| Theta Kappa Sigma | ? | | Halifax, NC | Inactive | | |
| Iota Delta Sigma | April 6, 1987 | | Concord, NC | Active | | |
| Iota Theta Sigma | December 31, 1986 | | Dorchester County, SC | Active | Serving the Summerville & North Charleston areas | |
| Iota Lambda Sigma | ? | | Conway, SC | Inactive | | |
| Iota Pi Sigma | April 28, 1987 | | Spartanburg, SC | Inactive | | |
| Kappa Iota Sigma | November 10, 1978 | | Beaufort, SC | Active | | |
| Kappa Kappa Sigma | ? | | Johnson City, TN | Inactive | | |
| Kappa Phi Sigma | June 18, 1996 | | Berkeley County, SC | Active | | |
| Nu Omicron Sigma | March 6, 2006 | | West Columbia, SC | Active | | |
| Xi Alpha Sigma | January 24, 2008 | | Chattanooga, TN | Active | | |
| Omicron Gamma Sigma | February 22, 2009 | | Greenville, NC | Active | | |
| Omicron Kappa Sigma | April 21, 2010 | | Aiken, SC | Active | | |
| Omicron Lambda Sigma | February 26, 2010 | | Newberry, SC | Active | | |
| Pi Sigma | ? | | Kingstree, SC | Active | | |
| Sigma Upsilon Sigma | January 18, 2020 | | Whiteville, NC | Active | | |
| Tau Epsilon Sigma | July 25, 2021 | | Davidson County, NC | Active | | |
| Tau Pi Sigma | May 31, 2023 | | Chapel Hill, NC | Active | | |
| Upsilon Beta Sigma | October 7, 1975 | | Salisbury, NC | Active | | |
| Upsilon Tau Sigma | December 16, 2024 | | New Bern, NC | Active | Serving Jones, Carteret, Craven, & Pamlico counties | |
| Upsilon Omega Sigma | December 15, 2025 | | Myrtle Beach, SC | Active | | |
| Phi Sigma | January 1, 1931 | | Knoxville, TN | Active | | |
| Phi Gamma Sigma | January 21, 2026 | | Great Falls, SC | Active | | |
| Phi Epsilon Sigma | June 27, 2026 | | Johnston County, NC | Active | | |

=== Southern ===
The states that make up the Southern Region are: Alabama, Florida, Georgia, and Mississippi, along with international chapters in the Bahamas, the Dominican Republic, and Barbados.

==== Collegiate chapters ====
| Name | Charter date and range | Institution | Location | Status | Notes | Ref. |
|---|---|---|---|---|---|---|
| Alpha Alpha Lambda | November 21, 1992 | Troy University | Troy, AL | Active | | |
| Alpha Beta | November 21, 1927 | Jackson State University | Jackson, MS | Active | First BGLO in the state of Mississippi | |
| Alpha Beta Gamma | November 21, 1998 | University of Tampa | Tampa, FL | Active | | |
| Alpha Beta Iota | April 20, 1999 | Florida Atlantic University | Boca Raton, FL | Active | | |
| Alpha Beta Theta | April 29, 1999 | Kennesaw State University | Kennesaw, GA | Active | Originally chartered at Southern Polytechnic State University and moved to Kennesaw State University upon the schools' consolidation in 2015 | |
| Alpha Beta Tau | 2000 | Kennesaw State University | Kennesaw, GA | Defunct | Suspended in 2014 and replaced by Southern Polytechnic State University's Alpha Beta Theta chapter during the schools' consolidation in 2015 | |
| Alpha Zeta | May 7, 1946 | Alcorn State University | Lorman, MS | Active | | |
| Alpha Eta | December 6, 1935 | Florida Agricultural and Mechanical University | Tallahassee, FL | Active | The first collegiate chapter in the state of Florida | |
| Alpha Pi | April 30, 1942 | Fort Valley State University | Fort Valley, GA | Active | | |
| Alpha Sigma Alpha | September 7, 1996 | University of Alabama in Huntsville | Huntsville, AL | Active | | |
| Alpha Omicron Alpha | April 28, 1996 | Mississippi University for Women | Columbus, MS | Active | | |
| Alpha Psi Alpha | January 26, 1995 | Auburn University at Montgomery | Montgomery, AL | Active | | |
| Beta Beta Alpha | December 2, 1998 | University of North Alabama | Florence, AL | Active | Chartered in 1998; re-established in 2000, 2021 | |
| Beta Beta Beta | November 16, 2001 | Clayton State University | Morrow, GA | Active | | |
| Beta Beta Gamma | November 11, 2001 | Augusta University | Augusta, GA | Active | | |
| Beta Beta Kappa | November 13, 2004 | University of North Florida | Jacksonville, FL | Active | | |
| Beta Beta Lambda | November 5, 2004 | College of the Bahamas | Nassau, New Providence, Bahamas | Active | The first undergraduate chapter of any Black Greek letter organization chartered outside of the Americas | |
| Beta Beta Tau | ? | LaGrange College | LaGrange, GA | Inactive | | |
| Beta Beta Phi | April 8, 2007 | University of West Florida | Pensacola, FL | Active | | |
| Beta Kappa | April 15, 1948 | Tuskegee University | Tuskegee, AL | Active | | |
| Beta Pi | March 10, 1947 | Florida Memorial University | Miami Gardens, FL | Active | First Greek letter fraternity founded at the university | |
| Beta Rho | May 18, 1948 | Tougaloo College | Tougaloo, MS | Active | | |
| Beta Psi | April 15, 1949 | Albany State University | Albany, GA | Active | | |
| Gamma Alpha Delta | February 24, 2008 | Nova Southeastern University | Fort Lauderdale, FL | Active | First BGLO chartered at the university | |
| Gamma Alpha Chi | May 31, 2010 | Florida Gulf Coast University | Fort Myers, FL | Inactive | | |
| Gamma Beta | May 20, 1949 | Alabama State University | Montgomery, AL | Active | Chapter was reactivated in the fall of 2011. | |
| Gamma Beta Beta | 2011 | Concordia College, Selma | Selma, AL | Defunct | The school closed in 2018. | |
| Gamma Beta Gamma | April 20, 2013 | Emory University | Atlanta, GA | Active | | |
| Gamma Epsilon | October 22, 1949 | Alabama A&M University | Normal, AL | Suspended | | |
| Gamma Zeta | October 31, 1949 | Savannah State University | Savannah, GA | Active | | |
| Gamma Theta | ? | Atlanta University | Atlanta, GA | Defunct | School merged with Clark College to become Clark Atlanta University in 1988 | |
| Gamma Iota Gamma | April 13, 2014 | Mercer University | Macon, GA | Inactive | | |
| Gamma Pi | March 15, 1960 | Edward Waters College | Jacksonville, FL | Suspended | Suspended until July 2028 | |
| Gamma Rho Delta | September 14, 2018 | Middle Georgia State University | Macon, GA | Active | | |
| Gamma Rho Zeta | October 29, 2019 | Stetson University | DeLand, FL | Active | | |
| Gamma Rho Mu | June 16, 2020 | Huntingdon College | Montgomery, AL | Inactive | First NPHC fraternity on campus | |
| Gamma Tau | August 8, 1962 | | St. Petersburg, FL | Inactive | | |
| Gamma Chi | August 8, 1962 | Stillman College | Tuscaloosa, AL | Active | First NPHC fraternity chartered at the college | |
| Gamma Psi | March 8, 1964 | Rust College | Holly Springs, MS | Active | | |
| Delta Pi | ? | Selma University | Selma, AL | Inactive | | |
| Delta Phi | April 8, 1968 | Mississippi Valley State University | Itta Bena, MS | Active | | |
| Epsilon Beta | November 4, 1970 | Paine College | Augusta, GA | Active | | |
| Epsilon Delta | April 1, 1971 | University of Miami | Coral Gables, FL | Active | | |
| Epsilon Rho | 1971 | Daniel Payne College | Selma, AL | Defunct | School closed in 1979 | |
| Epsilon Tau | December 5, 1971 | Talladega College | Talladega, AL | Active | | |
| Zeta | January 4, 1919 | Morris Brown College | Atlanta, GA | Active | The first collegiate chapter in the state of Georgia; Reactivated in spring 2025 | |
| Zeta Kappa | March 1, 1974 | University of Florida | Gainesville, FL | Active | | |
| Zeta Nu | November 9, 1974 | University of Georgia | Athens, GA | Active | | |
| Zeta Xi | April 20, 1974 | University of South Florida | Tampa, FL | Active | | |
| Eta Beta | February 26, 1975 | University of Mississippi | Oxford, MS | Active | | |
| Eta Epsilon | June 28, 1975 | University of Alabama at Birmingham | Birmingham, AL | Active | | |
| Theta Delta | March 23, 1976 | The University of Alabama | Tuscaloosa, AL | Active | Subject of March 24, 1994 edition of Rolling Stone magazine | |
| Theta Zeta | March 12, 1978 | Columbus State University | Columbus, GA | Active | | |
| Theta Eta | July 15, 1976 | University of Southern Mississippi | Hattiesburg, MS | Active | | |
| Theta Theta | ? | Mississippi Industrial College | Holly Springs, MS | Defunct | School closed in 1982 | |
| Theta Iota | September 20, 1976 | Mississippi State University | Starkville, MS | Active | | |
| Iota Rho | June 8, 1978 | University of Central Florida | Orlando, FL | Active | Was originally Florida Technical University but in 1978 was changed to the University of Central Florida | |
| Kappa Delta | March 31, 1979 | Valdosta State University | Valdosta, GA | Active | | |
| Kappa Zeta | June 14, 1978 | Auburn University | Auburn, AL | Active | | |
| Lambda Tau | May 17, 1980 | Florida International University | Miami, FL | Active | First GLO on campus | |
| Mu Epsilon | March 7, 1980 | Florida State University | Tallahassee, FL | Active | | |
| Mu Kappa | September 30, 1980 | University of West Alabama | Livingston, AL | Active | | |
| Mu Phi | March 14, 1982 | University of South Alabama | Mobile, AL | Active | | |
| Nu Beta | May 11, 1981 | Georgia Institute of Technology | Atlanta, GA | Active | | |
| Nu Phi | March 28, 1982 | University of West Georgia | Carrollton, GA | Active | | |
| Xi Beta | February 15, 1982 | Delta State University | Cleveland, MS | Active | | |
| Pi Alpha | February 15, 1985 | Georgia State University | Atlanta, GA | Active | | |
| Pi Epsilon | 1986 | Georgia Southwestern State University | Americus, GA | Inactive | | |
| Pi Kappa | October 23, 1985 | Jacksonville State University | Jacksonville, AL | Active | | |
| Pi Lambda | ? | Georgia College at Milledgeville | Milledgeville, GA | Inactive | | |
| Pi Rho | February 14, 1987 | Georgia Southern University | Statesboro, GA | Active | | |
| Rho Alpha | December 6, 1987 | DeVry University | Decatur, GA | Active | Originally chartered at DeVry University. Reactivated at Atlanta Metropolitan State College in spring 2026. | |
| Rho Lambda | ? | Georgia College & State University | Milledgeville, GA | Inactive | | |
| Rho Mu | | Miami Citywide | Miami, FL | Inactive | | |
| Sigma | January 23, 1925 | Miles College | Fairfield, AL | Active | The first collegiate chapter in the state of Alabama | |
| Chi | March 26, 1926 | Morehouse College | Atlanta, GA | Active | | |
| Psi | December 27, 1935 | Clark Atlanta University | Atlanta, GA | Active | | |

==== Alumni chapters ====
| Name | Charter date and range | Institution | Location | Status | Notes | Ref. |
|---|---|---|---|---|---|---|
| Alpha Alpha Zeta Sigma | ? | | Bradenton, FL | Inactive | | |
| Alpha Alpha Theta Sigma | February 7, 1994 | | Pensacola, FL | Active | Represents Escambia County, FL & Santa Rosa County, FL | |
| Alpha Alpha Iota Sigma | ? | | Bradenton, FL | Active | | |
| Alpha Eta Sigma | January 4, 1949 | | Montgomery, AL | Active | Represents Prattville, AL & Wetumpka, AL | |
| Alpha Iota Sigma | 1954 | | Lorman, MS | Active | | |
| Alpha Phi Sigma | June 30, 1947 | | Columbus, GA | Active | | |
| Alpha Chi Sigma | 1950 | | Dothan, AL | Active | Represents the "Wiregrass Area" | |
| Alpha Omega Sigma/F.L. | ? | | Fort Lauderdale, FL | Inactive | Former military designated chapter representing Fort Lauderdale | |
| Alpha Omega Sigma/F.S. | October 18, 1985 | | Hinesville, GA | Active | Military designated chapter representing Fort Stewart & Liberty County, GA | |
| Beta Gamma Sigma | ? | | St. Augustine, FL | Inactive | | |
| Beta Delta Sigma | 1941 | | Fort Valley, GA | Active | | |
| Beta Epsilon Sigma | May 1, 1948 | | Huntsville, AL | Active | Largest alumni chapter in Alabama | |
| Beta Zeta Sigma | May 7, 1948 | | Daytona Beach, FL | Active | | |
| Beta Lambda Sigma | March 12, 1949 | | Tallahassee, FL | Active | | |
| Beta Nu Sigma | 1949 | | Albany, GA | Active | | |
| Beta Pi Sigma | June 4, 1949 | | Tuscaloosa, AL | Active | | |
| Beta Sigma Sigma | 1951 | | Mobile, AL | Active | | |
| Gamma Sigma | 1918 | | Tuskegee, AL | Active | First alumni chapter in the state of Alabama; Home chapter of teacher and scientist George Washington Carver and Robert Russa Moton | |
| Gamma Gamma Sigma | October 20, 1951 | | Broward County, FL | Active | | |
| Gamma Delta Sigma | October 31, 1951 | | Orlando, FL | Active | Chartered by founder Leonard F. Morse and nine charter members | |
| Gamma Epsilon Sigma | November 21, 1951 | | Meridian, MS | Active | | |
| Gamma Zeta Sigma | February 18, 1952 | | West Palm Beach, FL | Active | Serving Palm Beach County, FL | |
| Gamma Eta Sigma | May 4, 1936 | | Tampa, FL | Active | | |
| Gamma Mu Sigma | April 2, 1955 | | Biloxi, MS | Active | Also serving Gulfport, MS | |
| Gamma Xi Sigma | ? | | Greenwood, MS | Inactive | | |
| Gamma Pi Sigma | January 8, 1956 | | Macon, GA | Active | | |
| Delta Alpha Sigma | September 29, 1958 | | Hattiesburg, MS | Active | | |
| Delta Epsilon Sigma | May 20, 1978 | | Nassau, Bahamas | Active | Serving New Providence Island, Southern Region Alumni Chapter Of The Year - Diamond Level (2024), Southern Region Social Action Partnerships Champion (2024), Southern Region Largest Membership Increase by Percentage (2024), International Model Chapter Of The Year - Diamond Level, Conclave 2025, Southern Region Alumni Chapter Of The Year - Gold Level (2025). Established First International Adopt-A-School MOU with Yellow Elder Primary School. | |
| Delta Lambda Sigma | May 10, 1962 | | Ft. Pierce, FL | Active | Serving the Treasure Coast region | |
| Delta Mu Sigma | October 10, 1962 | | Athens, GA | Active | | |
| Delta Omicron Sigma | November 14, 1963 | | St. Petersburg, FL | Active | Serving Pinellas County, FL | |
| Delta Tau Sigma | April 28, 1965 | | Holly Springs, MS | Active | | |
| Delta Upsilon Sigma | 1960 | | Starkville, MS | Active | | |
| Delta Phi Sigma | 1969 | | Greenwood, MS | Active | Serving Leflore County, MS | |
| Epsilon Gamma Sigma | June 4, 1968 | | Augusta, GA | Active | | |
| Epsilon Theta Sigma | 1970 | | Selma, AL | Active | Also represents Hayneville, AL | |
| Epsilon Omicron Sigma | November 23, 1973 | | Gainesville, FL | Active | | |
| Zeta Iota Sigma | March 21, 1977 | | Delray Beach, FL | Active | | |
| Zeta Mu Sigma | June 10, 1977 | | Anniston, AL | Active | Also represents Gadsden, AL and Talladega, AL | |
| Zeta Sigma Sigma | February 7, 2013 | | LaGrange, GA | Active | | |
| Zeta Upsilon Sigma | ? | | Jackson, AL | Active | Serving in and around Mobile County, AL | |
| Zeta Phi Sigma | ? | | Greenville, AL | Active | | |
| Eta Delta Sigma | November 10, 1979 | | Muscle Shoals, AL | Active | Also serves Florence, AL, Sheffield, AL, Tuscumbia, AL, Leighton, AL and Russellville, AL | |
| Eta Zeta Sigma | February 11, 1978 | | Clarksdale, MS | Active | | |
| Eta Eta Sigma | June 20, 1980 | | Durant, MS | | | |
| Eta Lambda Sigma | September 6, 1984 | | Oxford, MS | Active | Also serving Batesville, MS | |
| Eta Mu Sigma | April 30, 1980 | | Livingston, AL | Active | Also serving Demopolis, AL | |
| Eta Sigma Sigma | ? | | Forest, MS | Inactive | | |
| Eta Tau Sigma | ? | | Royal Palm Beach, FL | Inactive | | |
| Eta Chi Sigma | ? | | Gautier, MS | Inactive | | |
| Theta Eta Sigma | June 4, 1982 | | Lakeland, FL | Active | Serving the Greater Polk County area | |
| Theta Iota Sigma | March 7, 1983 | | Tupelo, MS | Active | Also serving Corinth, MS | |
| Theta Nu Sigma | ? | | Leland, MS | Inactive | | |
| Theta Rho Sigma | January 16, 1983 | | Miami, FL | Active | | |
| Theta Sigma Sigma | June 7, 1986 | | Valdosta, GA | Active | | |
| Iota Rho Sigma | ? | | Greenville, MS | Active | | |
| Kappa Alpha Sigma | December 12, 1987 | | Stone Mountain, GA | Active | Serving DeKalb County, GA | |
| Kappa Gamma Sigma | ? | | McIntosh, AL | Inactive | | |
| Kappa Epsilon Sigma | ? | | Vicksburg, MS | Active | | |
| Kappa Zeta Sigma | April 19, 1988 | | Warner Robins, GA | Active | | |
| Kappa Lambda Sigma | ? | | Marion, AL | Active | | |
| Kappa Chi Sigma | June 11, 1997 | | Cocoa, FL | Active | Represents Brevard County, FL | |
| Lambda Sigma | 1924 | | Atlanta, GA | Active | First alumni chapter founded in the State of Georgia | |
| Lambda Beta Sigma | 1929 | | Brunswick, GA | Active | | |
| Lambda Epsilon Sigma | 2000 | | Cleveland, MS | Active | | |
| Mu Sigma | 1938 | | Jackson, MS | Active | | |
| Nu Beta Sigma | 1930 | | Jacksonville, FL | Active | Originally chartered in Brunswick, Georgia, relocated to Jacksonville by founder Leonard F. Morse in 1933 | |
| Nu Mu Sigma | May 5, 2005 | | Ft. Myers, FL | Active | Serving communities throughout Southwest Florida | |
| Nu Psi Sigma | November 1, 2007 | | Dunwoody, GA | Active | | |
| Xi Chi Sigma | December 29, 2007 | | Atlanta, GA | Active | G.D.O.L.D. | |
| Omicron Mu Sigma | July 20, 2010 | | Dublin, GA | Active | | |
| Omicron Pi Sigma | September 10, 2011 | | Freeport, Bahamas | Active | Island of Grand Bahama | |
| Omicron Rho Sigma | October 19, 2011 | | Key Largo, FL | Inactive | | |
| Omicron Tau Sigma | April 3, 2012 | | Troy, AL | Active | | |
| Omicron Phi Sigma | July 19, 2012 | | Fort Walton Beach, FL | Active | Represents Okaloosa and Walton County, FL | |
| Pi Alpha Sigma | February 11, 2013 | | DeSoto County, MS | Active | | |
| Pi Delta Sigma | April 20, 2013 | | Central Florida | Active | Based in Ocala, FL | |
| Pi Omicron Sigma | November 14, 2014 | | Brookhaven, MS | Active | | |
| Pi Tau Sigma | November 21, 2015 | | Columbus, MS | Active | | |
| Pi Upsilon Sigma | March 21, 2015 | | Birmingham, AL | Active | Serving Jefferson County, AL & Walker County, AL | |
| Rho Sigma | 1927 | | Miami, FL | Active | Also Carol City, FL; the first alumni chapter in the state of Florida | |
| Rho Beta Sigma | October 8, 2015 | | Gwinnett County, GA | Active | | |
| Rho Iota Sigma | February 15, 2016 | | Rome, GA | Active | | |
| Rho Xi Sigma | April 19, 2017 | | Escambia County, AL | Active | Serving Atmore, AL, Brewton, AL, Flomaton, AL, & Century/Jay, FL | |
| Sigma Delta Sigma | May 6, 2019 | | Woodstock, GA | Active | Serving the North Metro Atlanta area | |
| Sigma Eta Sigma | May 6, 2019 | | McDonough, GA | Active | Serving Clayton County, GA, Fayette County, GA, Henry County, GA, and Spalding County, GA | |
| Sigma Xi Sigma | January 18, 2020 | | Hillsborough County, FL | Active | Serving the Tampa metropolitan area | |
| Tau Sigma | January 1924 | | Birmingham, AL | Active | | |
| Tau Beta Sigma | October 22, 1930 | | Savannah, GA | Active | | |
| Tau Sigma Sigma | August 17, 2023 | | Sanford, FL | Active | Serving Seminole County, FL | |
| Tau Tau Sigma | December 2, 2023 | | Santo Domingo, Dominican Republic | Active | | |
| Tau Upsilon Sigma | October 14, 2023 | | Clay County, FL | Active | | |
| Upsilon Theta Sigma | January 23, 2024 | | Gadsden County, FL | Active | | |
| Upsilon Iota Sigma | April 17, 2024 | | Douglas County, GA | Active | | |
| Upsilon Kappa Sigma | April 17, 2024 | | Clinton, MS | Active | | |
| Upsilon Omicron Sigma | October 26, 2024 | | Barbados, West Indies | Active | | |
| Phi Beta Sigma Sigma | January 21, 1996 | | Atlanta, GA | Active | | |

=== Southwestern ===
The states that make up the Southwestern Region are: Arkansas, Kansas, Missouri, Nebraska, Oklahoma, and all of Tennessee west of the 86th Longitude.

==== Collegiate chapters ====
| Name | Charter date and range | Institution | Location | Status | Notes | Ref. |
|---|---|---|---|---|---|---|
| Alpha Alpha Delta | April 4, 1990 | Omaha Citywide | Omaha, NE | Inactive | Membership drawn from University of Nebraska Omaha, Creighton University and/or Bellevue University | |
| Alpha Beta Delta | February 6, 1999 | Christian Brothers University / Rhodes College | Memphis, TN | Active | | |
| Alpha Beta Eta | March 3, 1999 | University of Arkansas at Little Rock | Little Rock, AR | Active | International Collegiate Model Chapter of the Year: Conclave Detroit 2017 & Conclave Las Vegas 2019 | |
| Alpha Beta Nu | March 1, 2000 | Missouri Western State University | St. Joseph, MO | Active | | |
| Alpha Gamma | October 10, 1927 | Fisk University | Nashville, TN | Active | | |
| Alpha Gamma Alpha | October 7, 1994 | Vanderbilt University | Nashville, TN | Active | | |
| Alpha Rho | May 20, 1982 | Austin Peay State University | Clarksville, TN | Active | | |
| Beta Beta Rho | April 7, 2006 | Arkansas Tech University | Russellville, AR | Inactive | | |
| Beta Epsilon | May 6, 1947 | Langston University | Langston, OK | Active | | |
| Beta Zeta | April 17, 1947 | Le Moyne-Owen College | Memphis, TN | Active | | |
| Beta Theta | August 21, 1947 | University of Arkansas-Pine Bluff | Pine Bluff, AR | Active | | |
| Beta Chi | April 1, 1949 | Lincoln University of Missouri | Jefferson City, MO | Active | | |
| Gamma Alpha Eta | February 16, 2008 | Belmont University | Nashville, TN | Active | | |
| Gamma Alpha Theta | November 30, 2007 | William Jewell College | Liberty, MO | Inactive | | |
| Gamma Alpha Mu | February 28, 2010 | Bethel University | McKenzie, TN | Active | | |
| Gamma Eta | November 21, 1949 | Harris–Stowe State University | St. Louis, MO | Active | | |
| Gamma Gamma Gamma | February 5, 2014 | Missouri University of Science and Technology | Rolla, MO | Inactive | 2014 Chapter of the Year in Missouri | |
| Gamma Theta Gamma | January 28, 2015 | Northwest Missouri State University | Maryville, MO | Active | | |
| Gamma Mu Gamma | May 10, 2016 | Lindenwood University | St. Charles, MO | Inactive | Originally chartered at Lindenwood University – Belleville (Great Lakes Region), which discontinued operations in 2020 | |
| Gamma Nu | September 4, 1982 | Wichita State University | Wichita, KS | Active | | |
| Gamma Rho Gamma | February 23, 2018 | Cumberland University | Lebanon, TN | Active | | |
| Gamma Rho Xi | May 29, 2021 | St. Louis University | St. Louis, MO | Active | | |
| Delta | April 9, 1917 | Kansas State University | Manhattan, KS | Inactive | | |
| Delta Epsilon | 1966 | Lane College | Jackson, TN | Inactive | | |
| Delta Nu | May 1, 1969 | University of Memphis | Memphis, TN | Active | | |
| Epsilon Lambda | March 23, 1972 | University of Central Missouri | Warrensburg, MO | Active | Formerly Central Missouri State | |
| Zeta Alpha | May 1, 1931 | Tennessee State University | Nashville, TN | Active | | |
| Zeta Omicron | October 20, 1979 | University of Kansas | Lawrence, KS | Active | | |
| Eta Gamma | August 23, 1973 | University of Missouri | Columbia, MO | Active | | |
| Theta | | George R. Smith College | Sedalia, MO | Defunct | School closed in 1925. Charter transferred to Huston–Tillotson University in Gulf Coast region. | |
| Theta Alpha | October 3, 1975 | Henderson State University | Arkadelphia, AR | Active | | |
| Theta Nu | February 26, 1976 | Southern Arkansas University | Magnolia, AR | Active | | |
| Iota Kappa | February 11, 1978 | Washington University in St. Louis | St. Louis, MO | Active | | |
| Iota Mu | March 18, 1978 | Middle Tennessee State University | Murfreesboro, TN | Active | | |
| Iota Pi | April 17, 1978 | University of Central Arkansas | Conway, AR | Active | | |
| Kappa | December 8, 1920 | Meharry Medical College | Nashville, TN | Active | | |
| Kappa Omicron | January 25, 1979 | University of Tennessee at Martin | Martin, TN | Active | | |
| Kappa Upsilon | March 3, 1978 | University of Arkansas at Fayetteville | Fayetteville, AR | Active | | |
| Lambda Alpha | January 11, 1980 | University of Missouri–Kansas City | Kansas City, MO | Active | | |
| Lambda Zeta | 1977 | University of Arkansas at Monticello | Monticello, AR | Active | | |
| Lambda Eta | October 23, 1979 | Arkansas State University | Jonesboro, AR | Active | | |
| Lambda Pi | January 9, 1979 | University of Central Oklahoma | Edmond, OK | Active | | |
| Mu Gamma | December 19, 1979 | American Baptist College | Nashville, TN | Inactive | | |
| Mu Tau | March 29, 1980 | Truman State University | Kirksville, MO | Inactive | Formerly Northeast Missouri State | |
| Xi | | Roger Williams University | Nashville, TN | Defunct | School closed in 1929. Charter transferred to Grambling State University in Gulf Coast region. | |
| Xi Delta | March 26, 1982 | University of Oklahoma | Norman, OK | Active | Notable initiates include Darrius Johnson, Martin Chase, Frank Trigg. | |
| Xi Iota | March 6, 1986 | Southeast Missouri State University | Cape Girardeau, MO | Active | | |
| Xi Mu | May 15, 1987 | Oklahoma State University | Stillwater, OK | Active | | |
| Pi Phi | ? | Culver-Stockton College | Canton, MO | Inactive | | |
| Rho Delta | ? | Missouri Valley College | Marshall, MO | Inactive | | |
| Rho Phi | December 12, 1989 | Arkansas Baptist College | Little Rock, AR | Active | | |
| Rho Chi | November 21, 1989 | Missouri State University | Springfield, MO | Active | Formerly Southwest Missouri State | |
| Phi | 1926 | Philander Smith College | Little Rock, AR | Active | | |

==== Alumni chapters ====
| Name | Charter date and range | Institution | Location | Status | Notes | Ref. |
|---|---|---|---|---|---|---|
| Alpha Delta Sigma | October 29, 1935 | | Kansas City, MO | Active | | |
| Alpha Omega Sigma/F.L.W. | May 1, 1995 | | Fort Leavenworth, KS | Active | Military designated chapter representing Fort Leavenworth; Known as the "Buffalo Soldier" chapter | |
| Alpha Omega Sigma/WAB | ? | | Whiteman Air Force Base, MO | Inactive | Former military designated chapter representing Whiteman Air Force Base | |
| Alpha Pi Sigma | ? | | Omaha, NE | Active | | |
| Gamma Psi Sigma | March 12, 1958 | | Pine Bluff, AR | Active | | |
| Delta Beta Sigma | ? | | Oklahoma City, OK | Active | | |
| Epsilon Sigma Sigma | May 23, 1974 | | Osceola, AR | Active | | |
| Zeta Omicron Sigma | ? | | Kansas City, MO | Inactive | | |
| Eta Beta Sigma | December 15, 1927 | | Nashville, TN | Active | | |
| Eta Kappa Sigma | ? | | Ripley, TN | Inactive | | |
| Eta Xi Sigma | ? | | Warrensburg, MO | Inactive | | |
| Theta Chi Sigma | December 10, 1981 | | Lawton, OK | Active | Known as the "Artillery Sigmas" | |
| Iota Omicron Sigma | ? | | Whiteville, TN | Inactive | | |
| Iota Tau Sigma | ? | | Forrest City, AR | Active | | |
| Iota Psi Sigma | January 9, 1988 | | Fort Riley, KS | Active | | |
| Kappa Sigma | 1924 | | St. Louis, MO | Active | The oldest alumni chapter west of the Mississippi River. | |
| Kappa Nu Sigma | August 1, 1990 | | Wichita, KS | Active | | |
| Kappa Tau Sigma | April 8, 1995 | | Tulsa, OK | Active | | |
| Kappa Omega Sigma | December 2, 1999 | | Fayetteville, AR | Active | | |
| Lambda Alpha Sigma | October 26, 1999 | | Clarksville, TN | Active | | |
| Lambda Gamma Sigma | January 15, 2000 | | Conway, AR | Active | | |
| Lambda Mu Sigma | February 28, 2002 | | Murfreesboro, TN | Active | Serving Rutherford County, TN | |
| Mu Beta Sigma | 1929 | | Little Rock, AR | Active | | |
| Nu Epsilon Sigma | June 8, 2003 | | Dyersburg, TN | Active | | |
| Nu Theta Sigma | July 16, 2004 | | Columbia, MO | Active | | |
| Nu Iota Sigma | November 16, 2004 | | Bolivar, TN | Active | | |
| Nu Xi Sigma | April 7, 2006 | | Magnolia, AR | Active | | |
| Nu Tau Sigma | March 29, 2007 | | Jonesboro, AR | Active | | |
| Omicron Omicron Sigma | January 26, 2011 | | Monticello, AR | Active | | |
| Pi Eta Sigma | January 9, 2014 | | Williamson County, TN | Active | | |
| Rho Phi Sigma | February 23, 2018 | | Camden, AR | Active | | |
| Rho Sigma Sigma | February 23, 2018 | | Springfield, MO | Active | | |
| Rho Upsilon Sigma | February 23, 2018 | | Lincoln, NE | Active | | |
| Tau Iota Sigma | June 7, 1935 | | Memphis, TN | Active | | |
| Upsilon Zeta Sigma | October 14, 2023 | | St. Charles, MO | Active | Known as the "Upper Echelon" Sigmas | |

=== Western ===
The states that make up the Western Region are: Alaska, Arizona, California, Colorado, Hawaii, Idaho, Montana, Nevada, North Dakota, Oregon, South Dakota, Utah, Washington, and Wyoming, along with international chapters in Japan, South Korea, Bahrain, and the United Arab Emirates.

==== Collegiate chapters ====
| Name | Charter date and range | Institution | Location | Status | Notes | Ref. |
|---|---|---|---|---|---|---|
| Alpha Alpha Epsilon | March 19, 1990 | University of Arizona | Tucson, AZ | Active | | |
| Alpha Alpha Zeta | 1990 | University of Idaho | Moscow, ID | Inactive | | |
| Alpha Alpha Eta | 1992 | University of the Pacific | Sonoma, CA | Inactive | | |
| Alpha Alpha Omicron | 1993 | Utah State University | Logan, UT | Inactive | | |
| Alpha Beta Alpha | 1999 | Washington State University | Pullman, WA | Inactive | | |
| Alpha Theta Alpha | ? | University of Oregon | Eugene, OR | Inactive | | |
| Alpha Iota Alpha | ? | University of Montana | Missoula, MT | Inactive | | |
| Alpha Upsilon | July 7, 1946 | California State University, Dominguez Hills | Los Angeles, CA | Active | First collegiate chapter chartered in the Western Region | |
| Beta Beta Epsilon | ? | California State University, Bakersfield | Bakersfield, CA | Inactive | | |
| Beta Beta Eta | ? | University of Wyoming | Laramie, WY | Inactive | | |
| Beta Omicron | May 1948 | Seattle Citywide | Seattle, WA | Inactive | | |
| Beta Tau | 2004 | Stanford University | Stanford, CA | Inactive | Charter originated at Merritt College in the 1960s; rechartered at Stanford | |
| Gamma Alpha Lambda | March 18, 2010 | University of Nevada, Reno | Reno, NV | Inactive | | |
| Gamma Delta | ? | University of Denver | Denver, CO | Inactive | | |
| Gamma Epsilon Gamma | April 14, 2014 | Honolulu, HI | Honolulu, HI | Inactive | | |
| Gamma Xi | February 8, 1958 | California State University, Fresno | Fresno, CA | Active | | |
| Gamma Rho Iota | January 18, 2020 | Northern Arizona University | Flagstaff, AZ | Inactive | | |
| Gamma Rho Nu | October 15, 2020 | University of California, Riverside | Riverside, CA | Active | | |
| Gamma Upsilon Gamma | August 14, 2018 | Oregon State University | Corvallis, OR | Inactive | | |
| Delta Beta | June 28, 1965 | California State University, East Bay | Hayward, CA | Active | Chartered by Huey P. Newton | |
| Delta Gamma | August 14, 1964 | California State University, Los Angeles | Los Angeles, CA | Active | | |
| Delta Lambda | ? | University of Redlands | Redlands, CA | Inactive | | |
| Zeta Pi | 1975 | Loyola Marymount University | Los Angeles, CA | Active | First NPHC organization chartered on campus | |
| Zeta Tau | January 23, 1975 | California State University, Long Beach | Long Beach, CA | Active | | |
| Theta Upsilon | 1976 | California State University, Fullerton | Fullerton, CA | Inactive | | |
| Iota Psi | ? | University of Northern Colorado | Greeley, CO | Inactive | | |
| Kappa Alpha | July 14, 1978 | California State University at Northridge | Northridge, CA | Active | | |
| Kappa Lambda | May 28, 1978 | University of Washington | Seattle, WA | Active | | |
| Lambda Iota | January 27, 1979 | San Diego State University | San Diego, CA | Active | | |
| Lambda Kappa | April 8, 1979 | University of California Davis | Davis, CA | Active | | |
| Lambda Xi | May 6, 1980 | Arizona State University | Phoenix, AZ | Active | | |
| Mu Lambda | May 31, 1980 | San Jose State University | San Jose, CA | Active | | |
| Mu Mu | 1980 | University of Colorado | Boulder, CO | Inactive | | |
| Mu Xi | February 12, 1981 | California State University, San Bernardino | San Bernardino, CA | Active | | |
| Nu Delta | February 7, 1981 | University of California, Los Angeles | Los Angeles, CA | Active | | |
| Nu Upsilon | April 24, 1981 | University of Southern California | Los Angeles, CA | Active | | |
| Nu Xi | ? | Colorado State University | Fort Collins, CO | Inactive | | |
| Omicron Zeta | October 1, 1980 | San Francisco State University | San Francisco, CA | Active | | |
| Omicron Eta | March 23, 1984 | California State University, Sacramento | Sacramento, CA | Active | | |
| Omicron Pi | June 16, 1984 | California Polytechnic State University, San Luis Obispo | San Luis Obispo, CA | Active | | |
| Omicron Psi | January 25, 1985 | University of California, Berkeley | Berkeley, CA | Active | | |
| Pi Delta | May 18, 1985 | California State University, Chico | Chico, CA | Active | | |
| Pi Zeta | December 12, 1986 | University of Nevada, Las Vegas | Paradise, NV | Active | | |
| Rho Eta | ? | University of Oregon | Eugene, OR | Inactive | | |

==== Alumni chapters ====
| Name | Charter date and range | Institution | Location | Status | Notes | Ref. |
|---|---|---|---|---|---|---|
| Alpha Alpha Epsilon Sigma | May 8, 1993 | | Inland Empire, CA | Active | Serving the Inland Empire metropolitan area | |
| Alpha Epsilon Sigma | October 13, 1946 | | Phoenix, AZ | Active | | |
| Alpha Nu Sigma | February 10, 1947 | | Oakland, CA | Active | | |
| Alpha Omega Sigma | October 26, 1982 | | Seoul, South Korea | Active | Military designated chapter based in Pyeongtaek | |
| Gamma Phi Sigma | March 18, 1957 | | San Francisco, CA | Active | | |
| Gamma Sigma Sigma | January 29, 2003 | | Antioch, CA | Active | Known as the “Central Valley Sigmas”, also serving Antioch, CA | |
| Delta Delta Sigma | January 23, 1961 | | Denver, CO | Active | | |
| Delta Psi Sigma | June 20, 1966 | | San Fernando Valley, CA | Active | | |
| Epsilon Delta Sigma | July 3, 1968 | | Fresno, CA | Active | | |
| Epsilon Epsilon Sigma | July 26, 1968 | | Seattle, WA | Active | | |
| Epsilon Psi Sigma | June 11, 1976 | | Las Vegas, NV | Active | | |
| Zeta Pi Sigma | 1974 | | Honolulu, HI | Active | | |
| Eta Nu Sigma | June 20, 1980 | | Colorado Springs, CO | Active | | |
| Theta Alpha Sigma | 1981 | | Long Beach, CA | Active | Chartered in Oxnard, CA | |
| Theta Gamma Sigma | May 1, 1982 | | Sacramento, CA | Active | | |
| Theta Zeta Sigma | ? | | Anchorage, AK | Inactive | | |
| Theta Lambda Sigma | 1988 | | San Jose, CA | Active | | |
| Iota Alpha Sigma | February 28, 1984 | | Oakland, CA | Active | | |
| Kappa Delta Sigma | December 18, 1988 | | West Los Angeles | Active | Chartered in Culver City, CA | |
| Kappa Eta Sigma | 1988 | | Palo Alto, CA | Active | | |
| Lambda Iota Sigma | July 24, 2000 | | San Diego, CA | Active | | |
| Lambda Kappa Sigma | October 20, 2001 | | Tucson, AZ | Active | | |
| Nu Eta Sigma | August 4, 2004 | | Tokyo, Japan | Active | | |
| Omicron Theta Sigma | February 20, 2010 | | Portland, OR | Active | | |
| Omicron Iota Sigma | March 11, 2010 | | San Diego, CA | Active | | |
| Omicron Upsilon Sigma | June 2, 2012 | | Beverly Hills, CA | Active | Chartered in San Bernardino, CA | |
| Pi Xi Sigma | August 4, 2014 | | Manama, Bahrain | Active | | |
| Pi Pi Sigma | December 2, 2014 | | Aurora, CO | Active | | |
| Rho Mu Sigma | November 20, 2016 | | Abu Dhabi, United Arab Emirates | Active | First NPHC fraternity chartered in the UAE | |
| Rho Pi Sigma | April 19, 2017 | | Reno, NV | Active | | |
| Rho Rho Sigma | April 19, 2017 | | Bakersfield, CA | Active | | |
| Rho Psi Sigma | August 14, 2018 | | Okinawa, Japan | Active | | |
| Sigma Zeta Sigma | May 6, 2019 | | Tacoma, WA | Active | | |
| Tau Theta Sigma | August 24, 2022 | | Scottsdale, AZ | Active | | |
| Tau Omicron Sigma | April 17, 2023 | | Sierra Vista, AZ | Active | | |
| Upsilon Psi Sigma | March 14, 2025 | | Altadena, CA | Active | | |
| Phi Beta Sigma | February 15, 1937 | | Los Angeles, CA | Active | First alumni chapter chartered in the Western Region | |
