= Robert O. Wilder Building =

- John W. Boddie House
- U.S. National Register of Historic Places
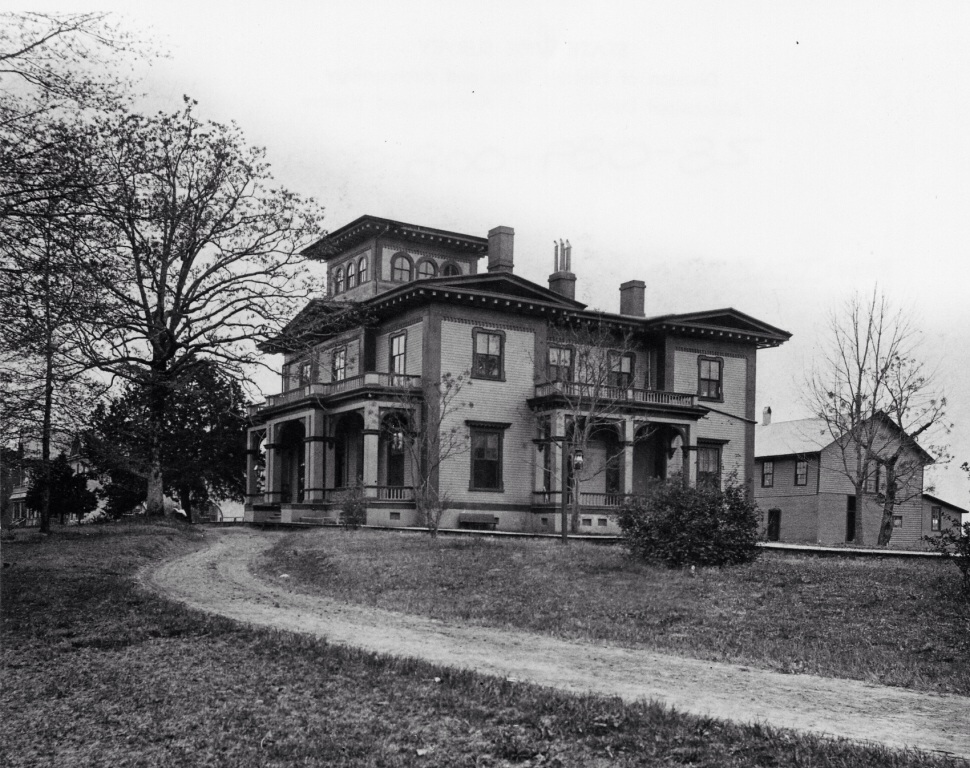
- The house c. 1900

- Location within Mississippi Location within the United States
- Location: County Line Road, Tougaloo, Mississippi
- Coordinates: 32.4041°N 90.1607°W
- Area: Tougaloo College campus
- Built: 1860
- Built by: Jacob Lamour
- Architect: Jacob Lamour
- Architectural style: Italianate
- Restored: 2003 structural, 2012 exterior, 2020 interior
- Restored by: WFT Architects, Jackson, MS
- Part of: Tougaloo College Historic District (ID98001109)
- NRHP reference No.: 82003106
- Added to NRHP: 1982-05-13

The Robert O. Wilder Building, previously known as the John W. Boddie House and then the Tougaloo Mansion House, is a historic plantation mansion on the campus of Tougaloo College in Tougaloo, Mississippi.

== History ==
The house was completed in 1860 for wealthy cotton planter and enslaver John Williams Boddie, who died at the end of the American Civil War. In 1869 the 500-acre former plantation, including the house, was bought for $10,500 (~$219,225 in 2024) by the Freedmen's Bureau and the American Missionary Association to become the campus of a school for Black students who were recently freed from slavery.

Initially, the building was used as a day school and later as housing for female students in the upstairs bedrooms. Later, it was used as a faculty dorm and as the college president's office. The building was renamed after college trustee Robert O. Wilder to better reflect the school's mission as a historically black college and to distance itself from an enslaver. It was individually listed on the National Register of Historic Places in 1982 and later became a contributing property to the Tougaloo College Historic District in 1998.

The building underwent structural renovations in 2003, and the exterior was refinished in 2012. The interior was renovated in 2020. The rebuilding project funds came from a combination of state and federal grants.

== Architecture ==
A large majority of Antebellum plantation houses are of the Greek Revival style, whereas this house is an unusual example of Italianate architecture. It was designed by local architect and builder Jacob Lamour of Canton. The building is a two-story Italianate plantation house with a gabled roof, bracketed cornices, and a belvedere. There is a grand entrance frontispiece with a six-panel front door.

== See also ==
- Annandale Plantation: another Italianate house also designed by Jacob Lamour
