= Ernst Borinski =

Polish American sociologist

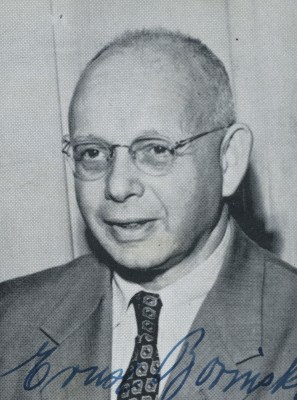
- Ernst Borinski's autographed yearbook photo from Tougaloo College's 1955 yearbook.
- Born: November 26, 1901; Kattowitz, German Empire (now Katowice, Poland)
- Died: May 26, 1983 (aged 81); Jackson, Mississippi, U.S.

Ernst Borinski (November 26, 1901 – May 26, 1983) was a German-Jewish sociologist and intellectual, who contributed to undermining Jim Crow laws in Mississippi during the 1950s and 1960s.

== Background ==
Borinski was born in the city of Kattowitz, in then-German Empire (now Katowice, Poland). His undergraduate studies were completed at the University of Berlin.

On March 21, 1938, he arrived in New York City aboard the Queen Mary. After serving four years in the U.S. Army during World War II, Borinski received a M.A. degree in sociology from the University of Chicago and a Ph.D. in sociology in Law from the University of Pittsburgh.

== Career ==
In 1947, he accepted a teaching position at Tougaloo College, a historically black college located in Tougaloo, Mississippi. In addition to heading the sociology department, Borinski also taught Russian, German and was a recognized authority on constitutional law.

In addition to teaching at Tougaloo, Borinski also held faculty positions at Duke University, Vanderbilt University, Hampshire College and the graduate program at Antioch University.

During the 1950s and early 1960s, Borinski regularly organized meetings between black and white groups in defiance of racial segregation. He spoke frequently at Millsaps College, a historically white institution in Jackson not far from Tougaloo College's campus. As a consequence of his activities, Borinski was the subject of investigation by the Mississippi State Sovereignty Commission. In 1980 the Southern Sociological Society made Borinski the third person on its "Roll of Honor," its "greatest recognition."

During his final years, Borinski began to reduce his workload due to age, but managed to teach one course each spring semester until he died on May 26, 1983, at the age of 81. He is buried at a small cemetery on the Tougaloo campus.

== Legacy ==
There is a building complex on Tougaloo's campus named after him.

In January 2000, Tougaloo sponsored their first annual history conference in his honor. The Mississippi ACLU gives out an annual award in his name.

Borinski is one of the subjects profiled in the documentary, From Swastika to Jim Crow, which looks at Jewish refugee scholars who taught at historically black colleges in the mid-20th Century.
