= Beverly W. Hogan =

Former university administrator

Beverly Wade Hogan is a former university administrator who became the first woman to be named president of Tougaloo College, her alma mater, in 2002.

== Early life and education ==
Hogan is a native of Crystal Springs, Mississippi. She originally attended Mississippi Valley State University, but transferred to Tougaloo College after being arrested and briefly incarcerated for her participation in civil rights activism at MVSU. She received a BA in psychology from Tougaloo College in 1972.

== Career ==
During the 1970s, Hogan was an active member of various mental health initiatives across Jackson, Mississippi. She was a mental health therapist at the Jackson Mental Health Center and a health services coordinator for Friends of Children in Mississippi. In 1974, she was appointed the executive director of the Hinds County Association for Mental Health. She joined the Democratic political movement later that year and supported Evelyn Gandy's bid for the Democratic nomination for governor. After Gandy lost to William Allain, Hogan joined his campaign.

In August 1980, Hogan was named executive director of the Mental Health Association in Mississippi (MHAM). She was responsible for the overall implementation and administration of the programs of the association. While serving in this role, Hogan was instrumental in founding a shelter for battered women and the first rape crisis center in Jackson. On January 11, 1984, she was appointed by Allain to the post of executive director of the Governor's Office of Federal-State Programs, becoming the first woman to serve as head of FederalState Programs from the outset of a governor's administration.

In 1997, Hogan returned to her alma mater as director of their new $6 million Health and Wellness Center. The facility offered drug abuse counseling, nutrition information, prenatal education, immunizations, and parenting education. During the same year, she was recognized for her mental health efforts at the Friendship Ball. She was eventually promoted to president of Tougaloo College in 2002. As a result of her promotion, she became the first woman to hold the office. She served for 17 years and was succeeded by Carmen J. Walters.

Hogan is on the board of directors at the Kettering Foundation, an American non-partisan research foundation founded in 1927 by Charles F. Kettering.
