= Tommie Mabry =

American author, scholar and advocate for impoverished youth

Tommie Mabry (born 1987 in Jackson, Mississippi) is an American author, scholar and advocate for impoverished youth, particularly in his home city of Jackson, Mississippi.

== Early life and education ==
Mabry was born in 1987, the youngest of six children, and grew up in an impoverished neighborhood in Jackson, Mississippi. He was expelled from seven elementary schools and three middle schools; at age 11, he was arrested and spent time in juvenile detention facility. In high school, Mabry joined an AAU basketball team, through which he received scholarship offers from multiple universities. However, he stopped playing after being shot in the foot during his senior year. He became the first person in his family to graduate high school.

After graduation, Mabry attended Missouri State University–West Plains on scholarship before transferring to Tougaloo College, where he was named Mister Tougaloo College in 2011; he received his Bachelor of Arts in education in 2011, followed by his Master of Arts in child development 2017. In 2020, he earned his Doctor of Philosophy in urban higher education from Jackson State University.

== Career ==
Mabry began his career as a teacher working at Whitten Middle School in Jackson.

In 2012, he self-published his first book, A Dark Journey to a Light Future. He self-published a version of the book geared toward middle school-aged children, If Tommie Can Do It, We Can Do It, in 2015, followed by a children's book edition, Little Tommie's Four B's, in 2019.

In 2016, he joined Tougaloo College as the university's Director of Enrollment.

In 2022, Mabry published Perspective! The Secret to Student Motivation and Success through SAGE Publications.

== Personal life ==
Mabry is married to Jerrika, with whom he has three children.

== Other ==
Mabry went to Yazoo City, Mississippi to make a motivational speech at Woolfolk Middle School.

== Publications ==
- A Dark Journey to a Light Future. Westbow Press. 2012. ISBN 9781449740573.
- If Tommie Can Do It, We Can Do It. Westbow Press. 2015. ISBN 9781490871608.
- Little Tommie's Four B's. Westbow Press. 2019. ISBN 9781973649939.
- Perspective! The Secret to Student Motivation and Success. SAGE Publications. 2022. ISBN 9781071856116.
