= Samuel C. Kincheloe =

American academic administrator and religious writer

Samuel Clarence Kincheloe (1890–1981) was an American minister, educator, college administrator, and author. He served as President of Tougaloo College in Mississippi, from 1956 to 1960.

== Biography ==
Samuel C. Kincheloe was born in 1890 in Georgetown, Ohio. He received a B.A. degree from Drake University as well as an M.A. degree and P.h.D. from the University of Chicago.

He was an ordained clergyman and taught sociology. He studied the sociology of churches in cities. He wrote The American City and Its Church.

Starting in 1956, Kincheloe served as President of Tougaloo College in Mississippi, a role he held until 1960. He had been preceded by Addison A. Branch who served as the acting President of Tougaloo College for a year; and was succeeded by Adam D. Beittel who served as Tougaloo College's president from 1960 to 1964.

Kincheloe gave an address to the Interdenominational Theological Center on matriculation day in 1960. In 1963, he was photographed teaching at Atlanta University's Interdenominational Theological Center. The Amistad Center at Tulane University has a collection of his papers.

== Writings ==
- "The Behavior Sequence of a Dying Church", Religious Education, Volume 24, No. 4 (1929)
- Research Memorandum on Religion in the Depression, Ayer Company Publishers, Incorporated, 1974 ISBN 9780405008467
- The American City and Its Church
