= Slayton A. Evans Jr. =

American chemist and educator

- Born: May 17, 1943; Chicago, Illinois, U.S.
- Died: March 24, 2001 (aged 57); Chapel Hill, North Carolina, U.S.
- Education: Tougaloo College; Case Western Reserve University
- Scientific career
- Fields: Conformational analysis Stereochemistry; Organophosphorus chemistry
- Workplaces: Dartmouth College (1972–1973); University of North Carolina, Chapel Hill (1974–2001)

Slayton A. Evans Jr. (May 17, 1943 – March 24, 2001) was an American chemist and professor at the University of North Carolina, Chapel Hill. He was a leading researcher into organophosphorus chemistry. His research led to a greater understanding of the functions of organophosphate compounds and innovations in methods to produce chemical compounds for pharmaceutical drugs.

== Early life and education ==
Slayton Alvin Evans Jr. was born on May 17, 1943, in Chicago, Illinois, to Corine M. Thompson Evans and Slayton A. Evans, Sr. Months later, his father was called to serve in World War II. When Slayton was three years old, the family moved to Meridian, Mississippi, where they lived in a segregated public housing project and his father worked at a J. C. Penney store. Slayton's interest in chemistry began early, when he was given a chemistry set. In addition, a small microscope allowed him to study various plant specimens and insects. Evans and his two younger siblings enrolled at a segregated primary school run by the Roman Catholic Church, and later he attended St. Joseph's High School. In 1957, when Evans was in the ninth grade, news of the artificial satellite Sputnik inspired him to learn about rocketry and attempt to build his own. While he was given permission by the nuns at his school to buy chemicals to make rocket fuel, he had to make his own powdered charcoal. He built six rockets, two of them achieving liftoff.

Evans helped pay for his school tuition by mowing lawns and during eighth grade he was a junior assistant janitor at his elementary school. Later he worked in the high school cafeteria. In his third year of high school, he considered going into the Air Force, but was too tall for flight training. However, he took several competitive examinations and was the recipient of an academic scholarship to Tougaloo College where he also received an athletic scholarship for basketball. He enrolled at Tougaloo in 1961.

By the end of his first year, Evans had top marks in chemistry in his class. He got a summer job working for the pharmaceutical company Abbott Laboratories in Chicago where he was tasked first with creating chemical compounds from raw materials, and later with identifying the stages of chemical reactions. Evans graduated from Tougaloo with a Bachelor of Science in chemistry in 1965. Evans was encouraged to attend graduate school, though he didn't know how to pay for it. He briefly attended the Illinois Institute of Technology before transferring to Case Western Reserve University in Cleveland, Ohio, where he was offered a research assistant position in the chemistry department. In his first year, he received a draft notice to go to the Vietnam War. University officials contacted the draft board and explained that Evans' research was crucial to the war effort. He was researching a medicine to treat schistosomiasis, a disease caused by parasitic flatworms that are common in Southeast Asia. He completed his coursework in 1969 and received his Ph.D. in chemistry in early 1970.

== Research and academic career ==
Evans took a postdoctoral fellowship at the University of Texas at Arlington for the 1970–1971 academic year, followed by second fellowship at the University of Notre Dame in Indiana, where he worked with the organic chemist Ernest L. Eliel studying stereochemistry. Upon the completion of the fellowship, he was invited to be a research instructor at Dartmouth College in 1972, though they did not have the laboratory equipment he required to continue his research. Evans then joined the faculty of the University of North Carolina at Chapel Hill as an assistant professor of chemistry in 1974. He was the first African-American chemistry professor at the university. After 10 years at Chapel Hill, Evans became a full professor, and in 1992 was honored with a Kenan Professor chair.

Evans was a leading researcher in the field of organophosphorus chemistry, authoring more than 85 scientific articles on organosulfur and organophosphorus chemistry. His research led to a deeper understanding of the functions of organophosphate compounds and innovations in methods to produce chemical compounds for pharmaceutical drugs. Evans was inspired by William Standish Knowles, who in 1968 developed a method of asymmetric hydrogenation, which Evans used to develop alternative asymmetric synthesis methods as a way to produce single stereoisomers. Evans started experimenting with organophosphorus chemistry in 1970, developing a process using phosphorus atoms of organophosphate compounds as agents to produce specific stereoisomers. He also devised a method of asymmetric synthesis to synthesize alpha-amino phosphonic acids by adding phosphorus to sulfimides.

At the University of North Carolina Evans assembled a research team of undergraduates, graduate students, and postdoctoral fellows from around the world. In the 1980s, a Ford Foundation Fellowship allowed him to create ties between his research team and a research group at the Paul Sabatier University in France, where he spent a full sabbatical year. Later, with the help of a Fulbright Fellowship, he built ties with groups in Mexico, Poland, Germany, Greece, and Russia.

Evans championed recruiting minority applicants to UNC-Chapel Hill, while on the national front, he served on committees of the American Chemical Society, the National Institutes of Health, the National Science Foundation, and was chair of the U.S. National Committee of the International Union of Pure and Applied Chemistry. He also served on a council that advised the National Institute of General Medical Sciences.

== Selected publications ==
- Lefebvre, Isabelle M.; Evans, Slayton A. (October 1997). "Studies toward the Asymmetric Synthesis of α-Amino Phosphonic Acids via the Addition of Phosphites to Enantiopure Sulfinimines". The Journal of Organic Chemistry. 62 (22): 7532–7533. doi:10.1021/jo971394o.
- Robinson, Philip L.; Barry, Carey N.; Kelly, Jeffery W.; Evans, Slayton A. (September 1985). "Diethoxytriphenylphosphorane: a mild, regioselective cyclodehydrating reagent for conversion of diols to cyclic ethers: stereochemistry, synthetic utility, and scope". Journal of the American Chemical Society. 107 (18): 5210–5219. doi:10.1021/ja00304a030.
- Kaloustian, Moses K.; Dennis, Nicholas; Mager, Sorin; Evans, Slayton A.; Alcudia, Felipe; Eliel, Ernest L. (February 1976). "Conformational analysis. XXXI. Conformational equilibria of 1,3-dioxanes with polar substituents at C-5". Journal of the American Chemical Society. 98 (4): 956–965. doi:10.1021/ja00420a015.
- Kelly, Jeffery W.; Anderson, Nita L.; Evans, Slayton A. (January 1986). "Cyclodehydration of N- and C-substituted .beta.-amino alcohols to the corresponding aziridines with diethoxytriphenylphosphorane". The Journal of Organic Chemistry. 51 (1): 95–97. doi:10.1021/jo00351a020. ISSN 0022-3263.
- Robinson, Philip L.; Barry, Carey N.; Bass, S. Woody; Jarvis, Susan E.; Evans, Slayton A. (December 1983). "Regioselective cyclodehydration of chiral diols with diethoxytriphenylphosphorane, triphenylphosphine-tetrachloromethane-potassium carbonate, and triphenylphosphine-diethyl azodicarboxylate reagents. A comparative study". The Journal of Organic Chemistry. 48 (26): 5396–5398. doi:10.1021/jo00174a059.

== Awards and recognition ==
- 1994 — Tanner Award for Teaching Excellence
- 1995 — NSF Special Creativity Award in Organophosphorus Chemistry
- 1998 — ACS Award for Encouraging Disadvantaged Students into Careers in the Chemical Sciences
- Chancellor's Award for Excellence in Undergraduate Education
- Howard University Outstanding Achievement Award

== Personal life ==
Evans married Tommie Johnson in 1967. They had two children. Evans died on March 24, 2001, in Chapel Hill. The Slayton A. Evans Jr. Memorial Lecture Fund and the Slayton Evans Research Award were both named in his honor post-humously.
