= William Trumbull Holmes =

US minister and education administrator

William Trumbull Holmes was an American minister and college president.

== Early life and education ==
Holmes was born in New York City. He graduated from Oberlin College in 1892, and from Andover Theological Seminary in 1897, while he also studied at Union Theological Seminary.

== Career ==
He was ordained as a Congregational minister in 1897, and served as the second Associate Minister at Central Congregational Church in Providence, RI from 1897 to 1901. During this time, he served under the Rev. Edward Caldwell Moore.

Beginning in 1901, he served as pastor of the First Congregational Church in Watertown, CT.

He was the president of Tougaloo College in Mississippi from 1913 to his retirement in 1933. He grew the college tremendously during his tenure.

In 1926, Holmes as President of Tougaloo was named Missionary Pastor of Central Church for the Home Field, during the pastorate of the Rev. Arthur Howe Bradford.

He died at his home in New York City on July 28, 1940. His funeral was held at Riverside Church, and he was buried in Watertown, CT.
