= George Albert Owens =

American educator (1919–2003)

8th President of Tougaloo College (acting)
- In office September 1964 – 1965
- Preceded by: Adam Daniel Beittel

9th President of Tougaloo College
- In office 1966–1984
- Succeeded by: Herman Blake

Personal details
- Born: February 9, 1919 Bolton, Mississippi, U.S.
- Died: December 21, 2003 (aged 84)
- Education: Tougaloo College, Columbia University
- Occupation: Academic administrator, college president

George Albert Owens (February 9, 1919 – December 21, 2003) was an American academic administrator and college president. He served as the 9th president of Tougaloo College in Mississippi serving from 1966 to 1984. He was the college's first African American president. He succeeded Adam D. Beittel who was removed from office after supporting civil rights activists. While in office he increased funding and campus housing.

== Biography ==
He was born in Bolton, Mississippi, on February 9, 1919, to sharecropping parents and he graduated from Jackson College High School. He graduated from Tougaloo College and Columbia University. He had captained the school's football team. He worked as its business manager.

The New York Times quoted him in a story about the college in 1970 saying "Institutions like ours have the responsibility to identify the strengths of our students". His wife's name was Ruth and she died before him. The college's gymnasium was named for them. U.S. Surgeon General Jerome Adams visited the health and wellness center named for him on the occasion of its 20th anniversary.

He received threats as college president, as well as other staff, and his home on the college campus was bombed.

Owens died on December 21, 2003, after suffering with Parkinson's disease. His two children survived him.
