= Adam Daniel Beittel =

American academic

Adam Daniel Beittel (December 19, 1898 – July 26, 1988) was a minister, academic and supporter of civil rights. He was president of Talladega College from 1945 to 1952 and Tougaloo College from 1960 to 1964.

== Early life and education ==
Beittel was born on December 19, 1898, in Lancaster, Pennsylvania. His father was a pet and housewares store owner.

Beittel graduated from the University of Findlay in Findlay, Ohio, in 1922. He received a master of art degree from Oberlin College in 1923 then his bachelor of divinity degree in 1925. In 1929, he received his doctorate of philosophy from the University of Chicago.

== Career ==
An ordained minister, Beittel was a pastor at churches in Columbus, Ohio, Montana and Nashville, Tennessee. He later taught at Earlham College in Indiana and Guilford College in North Carolina. Beittel was known for efforts to promote interracial understanding.

In 1945 he became president of Talladega College, a biracial college. Following charges by students, faculty and alumni of his "ambiguous attitude" toward racial discrimination and segregation, among other claims of competency and leadership issues, Beittel was fired in 1952. In its decision the trustees of the college stated, "The members of this body believe Dr. Beittel has been wronged both by the charges made against him and by the methods resorted to by those who attacked him" but conceded he could no longer carry out his duties given the circumstances.

=== Tougaloo College ===
After leaving Talladega College, Beittel was dean of the chapel and professor of religious studies at Beloit College until 1960 when he became president of Tougaloo College, succeeding Samuel C. Kincheloe.

During Beittel's tenure, students attending the African American college, staged civil rights protests and attempted to integrate the Jackson Public Library by organizing a sit-in, the first sit-in in Jackson, Mississippi, and one of the first civil rights acts in Mississippi. Beittel refused to expel students and, at times, bailed students out of jail. The campus also housed Freedom Riders while they appealed their arraignments, leading to one trustee resigning from the Tougaloo board claiming the school had become "a rallying place for outside agitators".

In an effort to integrate the school, in 1961 Beittel admitted two out-of-state white females, one a Freedom Rider. Facing bitter opposition and potential legal consequences, Beittel claimed the school charter allowed an education for all and noted the children of white faculty members previously attended classes.

In 1962, Beittel was elected chairman of The Mississippi Council of Human Relations and secretary of the Mississippi State Advisory Committee, part of the United States Commission on Civil Rights.

In February 1964, Mississippi Lieutenant Governor, Carroll Gartin, called for an investigation of Tougaloo, citing the student's demonstrations, to determine if it was abiding by the school's charter. Gartin referenced Tennessee stating the state was able to "get rid" of a school "which was a hangout for Communists and agitators. We ought to see if we have the same situation here in our backyard". Beittel welcomed a probe as long as it was from a reputable party. In the same month, state senator Brad Dye introduced a bill to revoke Tougaloo's state charter, claiming the school had violated the charter's provisions.

On April 25, 1964, Beittel announced a comprehensive long-term development plan for Tougaloo in partnership with Brown University. The unique partnership was backed with grants and other aid to expand the Tougaloo's faculty and educational programs for students.

Two days later Beitell announced his retirement effective that September citing health reasons. He was succeeded by George Albert Owens, Tougaloo's first African American president.

The bill to revoke Tougaloo's State charter was subsequently dropped.

In 1968, leaked documents from the Mississippi Sovereignty Commission revealed the commission actively sought Beittel's resignation, labeling him a communist and agitator. Shortly before Beittell's resignation, commission members secretly met with Tougaloo's trustees offering a deal to drop the bill seeking revocation of Tougaloo's charter if trustees would "get rid" of Beittel. In a statement Beittel confirmed his retirement was involuntary but the decision had come months before the commission's involvement.

A collection of Beittel's oral interviews are held at the Library of Congress.

In Anne Moody's 1968 memoir, Coming of Age in Mississippi, Moody credits Beittel with rescuing her from a violent attack during a sit-in.

== Personal life ==
Beittel was married and had two sons. After Beittel's retirement he was director of the American Friends Service Committee and board member of non-profit religious and human rights groups. He died in California on July 26, 1988.
