= Carmen J. Walters =

American academic administrator

14th President of Tougaloo College
- In office July 2019 – June 30, 2023
- Preceded by: Beverly Wade Hogan

Personal details
- Born: Carmen Jean Hawkins Louisiana, U.S.
- Education: Southern University at New Orleans, Xavier University of Louisiana, Mississippi State University

Carmen Jean Walters (née Hawkins) is an American academic administrator and college president. She was the president of Tougaloo College from 2019 until 2023, a private historically Black college in Jackson, Mississippi.

== Early life and education ==
Carmen Jean Walters was born in the United States. She is Black, and was the ninth of thirteen children in her family. Walters grew up in New Orleans, Louisiana; and attended John Ehret High School in Marrero, Louisiana.

Walters has a B.A. degree in accounting and business administration from Southern University at New Orleans; a M.A. degree in postsecondary counseling from Xavier University of Louisiana in New Orleans; and a Ph.D. in community college leadership from Mississippi State University.

== Career ==
Walters worked for 18 years at Delgado Community College in New Orleans, where she held various roles. She also worked at Mississippi Gulf Coast Community College for 6 years as the executive vice president of enrollment, student success, and institutional relations. She is a Christian and also has experience in church administration work.

In July 2019, she was elected as the 14th president of Tougaloo College, and served as its second female president. She negotiated Tougaloo’s entry into a game-changing federal research project. The consortium, led by Howard University in Washington, D.C., placed Walters' institution at the center of a five-year, $90 million research contract with the United States Air Force and Department of Defense, better known as a university-affiliated research center (UARC). She helped the college navigate the COVID pandemic, successfully weathered a cyber-attack that attempted to disrupt and access data, functions, or other restricted areas of the college’s network system, improved the college's national ranking, created opportunities for more high schoolers to access college courses through the dual enrollment/dual credit policy, and improved Tougaloo's facilities through the investment of more than $4 million to renovate/upgrade campus facilities, including Galloway Hall, New Women’s, Renner, and AA Branch Residence Halls, Jamerson Hall, Zenobia Coleman Library, Pope Cottage, George A. and Ruth B. Owens Health and Wellness Center, and Woodworth Chapel. Walters resigned from her position at Tougaloo in June 2023.

She was married to late Wayne Walters, and they had two daughters.
