= Tougaloo College =

Private historically Black college in Jackson, Mississippi, US

- Tougaloo College seal
- Former name: Tougaloo University (1871–1916)
- Motto: "Where History Meets the Future"
- Type: Private historically black college
- Established: 1869
- Affiliations: UNCF
- Religious affiliation: United Church of Christ and Christian Church (Disciples of Christ)
- Endowment: $10 million
- President: Dr. Corey Wiggins
- Faculty: 100
- Undergraduates: 2,364
- Location: Jackson, Mississippi, U.S. 32°24′11″N 90°09′39″W
- Colors: Royal blue & scarlet
- Nicknames: Bulldogs and Lady Bulldogs
- Sporting affiliations: NAIA – HBCUAC
- Website: www.tougaloo.edu
- Tougaloo College
- U.S. National Register of Historic Places
- U.S. Historic district
- Strieby Hall in 1899

- Location within Mississippi Location within the United States
- Location: Tougaloo, Mississippi
- Area: 15 acres (6.1 ha)
- Built: 1848
- NRHP reference No.: 98001109
- Added to NRHP: August 31, 1998

Tougaloo College is a private historically black college in the Tougaloo area of Jackson, Mississippi, United States. It is affiliated with the United Church of Christ and Christian Church (Disciples of Christ). It was established in 1869 by New York–based Christian missionaries for the education of freed slaves and their descendants. From 1871 until 1892, the college served as a teachers' training school funded by the state of Mississippi. In 1998, the buildings of the old campus were added to the National Register of Historic Places. Tougaloo College has an extensive history of civic and social activism, including the Tougaloo Nine.

== History ==
=== Establishment ===
In 1869, the American Missionary Association of New York purchased 500 acres (202 ha) of one of the largest former plantations in central Mississippi to build a college for recently freed slaves and their children. The purchase included a standing mansion and outbuildings, which were immediately converted for use as a school. The next year expansion of facilities began in earnest with the construction of two new buildings—Washington Hall, a 70-foot-long edifice containing classrooms and a lecture hall, and Boarding Hall, a two-story building which included a kitchen and dining hall, a laundry, and dormitories for 30 female students.

Costs of construction were paid by the United States government through the education department of its Bureau of Refugees and Freedmen. Additional funds, totaling $25,500 in all, were provided for development of the school farm, including monies for farm implements and livestock.

In 1871, the Mississippi State Legislature granted the new institution a formal charter under the name of Tougaloo University. No contingency fund was provided for the day-to-day operation of the school, with some students paying a tuition of $1 per month while others attended tuition free, contributing labor on the school farm in lieu of fees. The cost of two teachers at the school for five months were paid by the county boards of education of Hinds and Madison counties; all additional operating funds were provided by the American Missionary Association.

In its initial institutional form, Tougaloo University was not a university but provided basic education for black students born under slavery. Another goal was to train African-American students for service as teachers. At the end of 1871, the school included 94 "elementary students", 47 that were part of the "normal school", and one categorized as "academic" (college preparatory)—a total student body of 142. At this time the school found itself in dire need of expanded facilities and operational funds; an appeal was made by three leaders of Tougaloo University to the Mississippi Superintendent of Public Education for a state role in the institution. Legislation followed authorizing the establishment of a State Normal School on the grounds of Tougaloo and providing a total of $4,000 for two years to help provide teachers' salaries, student aid, and for the purchase of desks.

As part of the establishment of the Normal School at Tougaloo, each county in the state was provided with two free scholarships, and every student declaring an intention to teach in Mississippi's common schools was to be allotted a stipend of 50 cents per week out of the state funds for student aid, an amount capped at $1,000 per year.

In 1873, Tougaloo University added a theological department for students intending on entering the Christian ministry and expanded its industrial department, adding a cotton gin, apparatus for grinding corn, and developing capacity for the manufacture of simple furniture on site.

On January 23, 1881, Washington Hall—the main classroom building—caught fire during religious services and was entirely destroyed. For the rest of the academic year, classes were conducted in a new barn recently constructed on campus, nicknamed "Ayrshire Hall". On May 31, 1881, the foundation was laid for a new classroom building, a three-storey facility named Strieby Hall after M.E. Strieby of New York, a venerated leader of the American Missionary Association.

Courses for college credit were first offered in 1897, and the first Bachelor of Arts degree was awarded in 1901.

In 1916, the name of the institution was changed to Tougaloo College.

=== Return to private status ===
Tougaloo remained predominantly a teacher training school until 1920, when the college ceased receiving aid from the state.

=== Mergers ===
Six years after Tougaloo's founding, the Home Missionary Society of the Christian Church (Disciples of Christ) obtained a charter from the Mississippi State Legislature to establish a school at Edwards, Mississippi, to be known as Southern Christian Institute. That same year, Sarah Ann Dickey, who had worked with the American Missionary Association since the 1860s, established the Mount Hermon Female Seminary, which would later merge with Tougaloo in 1924, as the two schools had similar ideals and goals. Similarly, the Southern Christian Institute would merge with Tougaloo in 1954.

=== Recent history ===
Carmen J. Walters, the fourteenth president (and second female president), began her tenure July 1, 2019. She stepped down in June 2023 and Donzell Lee was appointed interim president.

In 2020, Tougaloo received $6 million (~$7.34 million in 2025) from philanthropist MacKenzie Scott. It is the largest gift from a single donor in Tougaloo's history.

== Presidents ==
- Ebenezer Tucker (1869–1870, principal)
- Andrew J. Steele (1870–1873, principal)
- John K. Nutting (1873–1875, principal/president)
- Leander A. Darling (1875–1877, principal/president)
- George S. Pope (1877–1887)
- Frank G. Woodworth (1887–1912)
- William T. Holmes (1913–1933)
- Charles B. Austin (1933–1935, acting)
- Judson L. Cross (1935–1945)
- Lionel B. Fraser (1945–1947, acting)
- Harold C. Warren (1947–1955)
- Addison A. Branch (1955–1956, acting)
- Samuel C. Kincheloe (1956–1960)
- Adam Daniel Beittel (1960–1964)
- George Albert Owens (1964–1965, acting)
- George Albert Owens (1965–1984)
- J. Herman Blake (1984–1987)
- Charles A. Baldwin (1987–1988, acting)
- Adib A. Shakir (1988–1994)
- Edgar E. Smith (1994–1995, as acting)
- Joseph A. Lee (1995–2001)
- James H. Wyche (2001–2002, acting)
- Beverly W. Hogan (2002–2019)
- Carmen J. Walters (2019–2023)
- Donzell Lee (2023–2026, acting)
- Corey Wiggins (2026–present)

== Campus ==
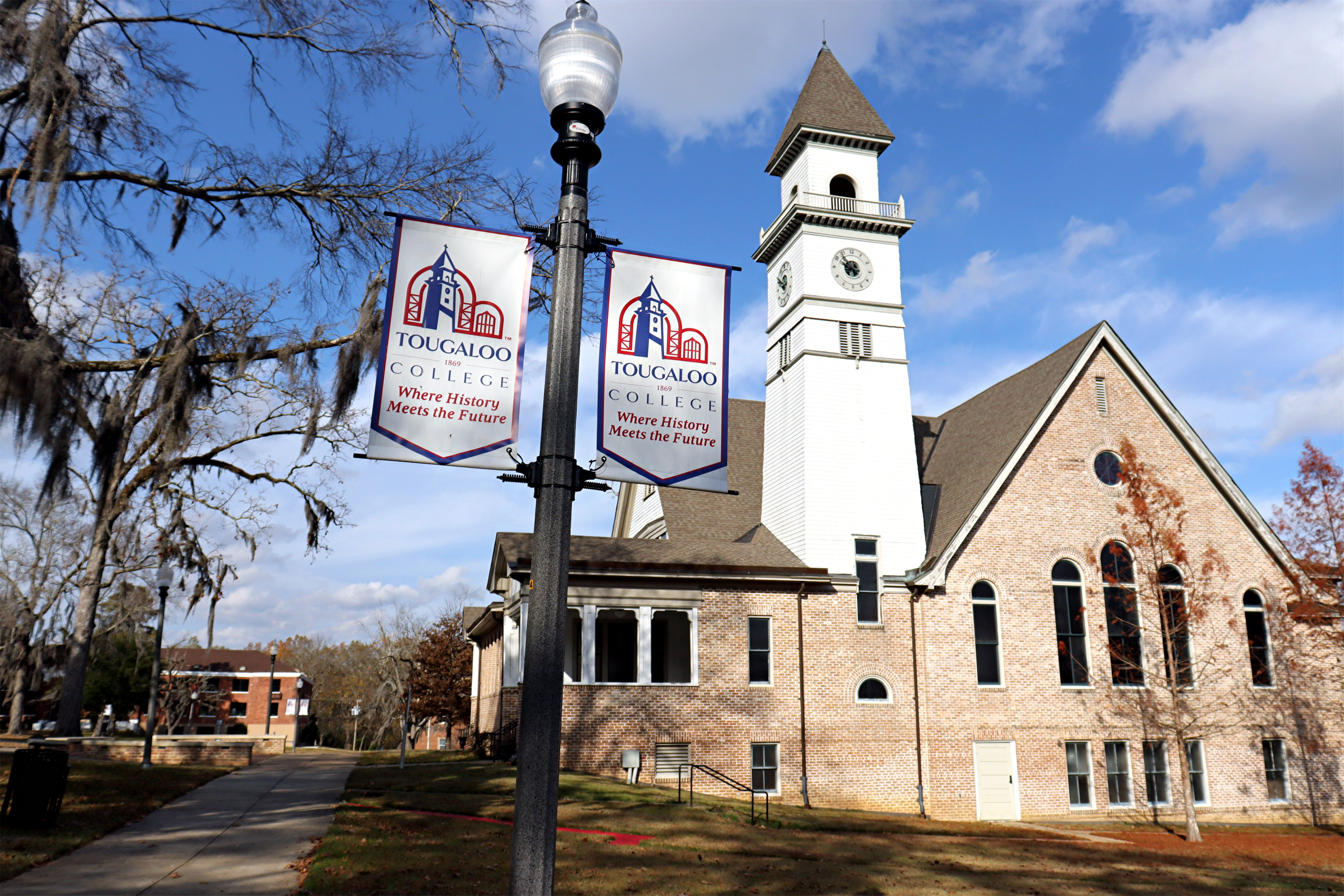
Woodworth Chapel on campus

The campus is in Jackson, and in Madison County. The campus includes a Historic District, which comprises ten buildings that are each listed on the National Register of Historic Places. The Robert O. Wilder Building, built in 1860 and also known as "The Mansion", overlooks the ensemble of buildings forming the college's historic core.

Woodworth Chapel, originally known as Woodworth Church, was built in 1901 by students. It was restored and rededicated in 2002. In September 2004, the National Trust for Historic Preservation awarded Tougaloo College the National Preservation Honor Award for the restoration of Woodworth Chapel. The restoration was also recognized by the Mississippi Chapter of the American Institute of Architects, who bestowed its Honor Award. Woodworth Chapel houses the Union Church, founded alongside the college as a Congregational Church. Today, it is one of two congregations of the United Church of Christ in Mississippi. Located in the heart of the campus beside Woodworth Chapel is Brownlee Gymnasium. Built in 1947, the building was named in honor of Fred L. Brownlee, former general secretary of the American Missionary Association.

The college holds the prestigious Tougaloo Art Collection. It was begun in 1963, by a group of prominent New York artists, curators and critics, initiated by the late Ronald Schnell, professor emeritus of Art, as a mechanism to motivate his art students. The collection consists of pieces by African American, American and European artists. Included in the African-American portion of the collection are pieces by Jacob Lawrence, Romare Bearden, David Driskell, Richard Hunt, Elizabeth Catlett and Hale Woodruff. The 1,150 works in the collection include paintings, sculptures, drawings, collages, graphic art and ornamental pieces.

The Tougaloo Art Colony is another distinctive resource of the college. Begun in 1997 under the leadership of former College trustee, Jane Hearn, the Tougaloo Art Colony affords its participants exposure to and intensive instruction by artists. The Civil Rights Library and Archives are a part of Tougaloo College. Among their holdings are the original papers, photographs and memorabilia of movement leaders including Fannie Lou Hamer, Medgar Evers and Martin Luther King Jr. It contains the works of blues musician B.B. King.

The college established the Medgar Evers Museum in 1996. The Evers family (trustee Myrlie Evers-Williams and her children with Medgar) donated their home to Tougaloo College for its historical significance. In 1996, the home was restored to its condition at the time of Mr. Evers' assassination in the driveway. It is operated as a house museum and is open to the public. In 2020, the home was acquired by the National Park Service and designated a national monument.

== Academics ==
According to the Tougaloo College website, "over 40% of the African American physicians and dentists practicing in the state of Mississippi, more than one-third of the state's African American attorneys and educators including teachers, principals, school superintendents, college/university faculty and administrators" were trained at the school.

In the 2022 U.S. News & World Report college and university rankings, Tougaloo College ranked #15 among historically black colleges and universities. The same magazine reported that in 2022 only 18% of the college's students graduated after four years, placing Tougaloo at the bottom of national rankings.

Tougaloo College is accredited by the Southern Association of Colleges and Schools (SACS); the college was initially accredited by SACS in 1953. As of 2012, it is in good standing with SACS.

== Athletics ==
The Tougaloo athletic teams are called the Bulldogs. The college is a member of the National Association of Intercollegiate Athletics (NAIA), primarily competing in the HBCU Athletic Conference (HBCUAC), formerly the Gulf Coast Athletic Conference (GCAC), since the 1981–82 academic year.

Tougaloo competes in 11 intercollegiate varsity sports: Men's sports include baseball, basketball, cross country, soccer and tennis; women's sports include basketball, competitive cheer, cross country, soccer, tennis and volleyball.

== Notable people ==
=== Faculty ===
- Ernst Borinski (1901–1983), sociologist
- L. Zenobia Coleman (1898–1999), librarian
- James W. Loewen (1942–2021), author
- John U. Monro (1912–2002), director of the writing center

=== Alumni ===
Name	Class year	Notability	Reference(s)
Reuben V. Anderson	1965	first black judge to sit on the Mississippi Supreme Court	
Edward Blackmon Jr.	1971	Mississippi House of Representatives	
Colia Clark		civil rights activist and candidate for U.S. Senate in New York	
Aunjanue Ellis	attended	actor	
Slayton A. Evans Jr.	1965	research chemist and professor at the University of North Carolina at Chapel Hill	
Lemuel L. Foster		community leader in Harlem, New York City, civil servant, and business executive	
Lawrence Guyot	1963	civil rights activist, director of the Mississippi Freedom Democratic Party	
Beverly Wade Hogan	1973	mental health advocate, first female president of Tougaloo College	
Joyce Ladner	1964	sociologist, civil rights activist, and first female president of Howard University	
Tommie Mabry	2011	author and advocate for impoverished youth	
Zeita Merchant	1998	Coast Guard admiral, and highest ranking African American woman in United States Coast Guard	
Anne Moody	1964	author and civil rights activist	
Joan Trumpauer Mulholland	1964	civil rights activist and first white student	
Hakeem Oluseyi	1991	astrophysicist and popularizer of science	
Aaron Shirley	1955	founder of Jackson Medical Mall and recipient of MacArthur award	
Constance Slaughter-Harvey	1967	first black judge in the state of Mississippi	
Arthur Tate		first African American to serve in the Mississippi State Senate since the Reconstruction era	
Bennie Thompson	1968	U.S. congressman	
Walter Turnbull, PhD	1966	founder of the Boys Choir of Harlem	
Walter Washington		former general president of Alpha Phi Alpha fraternity and President of Alcorn State University	
Karen Williams Weaver	1982	mayor of Flint, Michigan	
Charles Young Jr.		member, Mississippi House of Representatives	
