= Lawrence Township, New Jersey =

Lawrence Township is the name of two places in the U.S. state of New Jersey:

- Lawrence Township, Cumberland County, New Jersey
- Lawrence Township, Mercer County, New Jersey

== See also ==
- Lawrence Township (disambiguation)
