= Tougaloo, Mississippi =

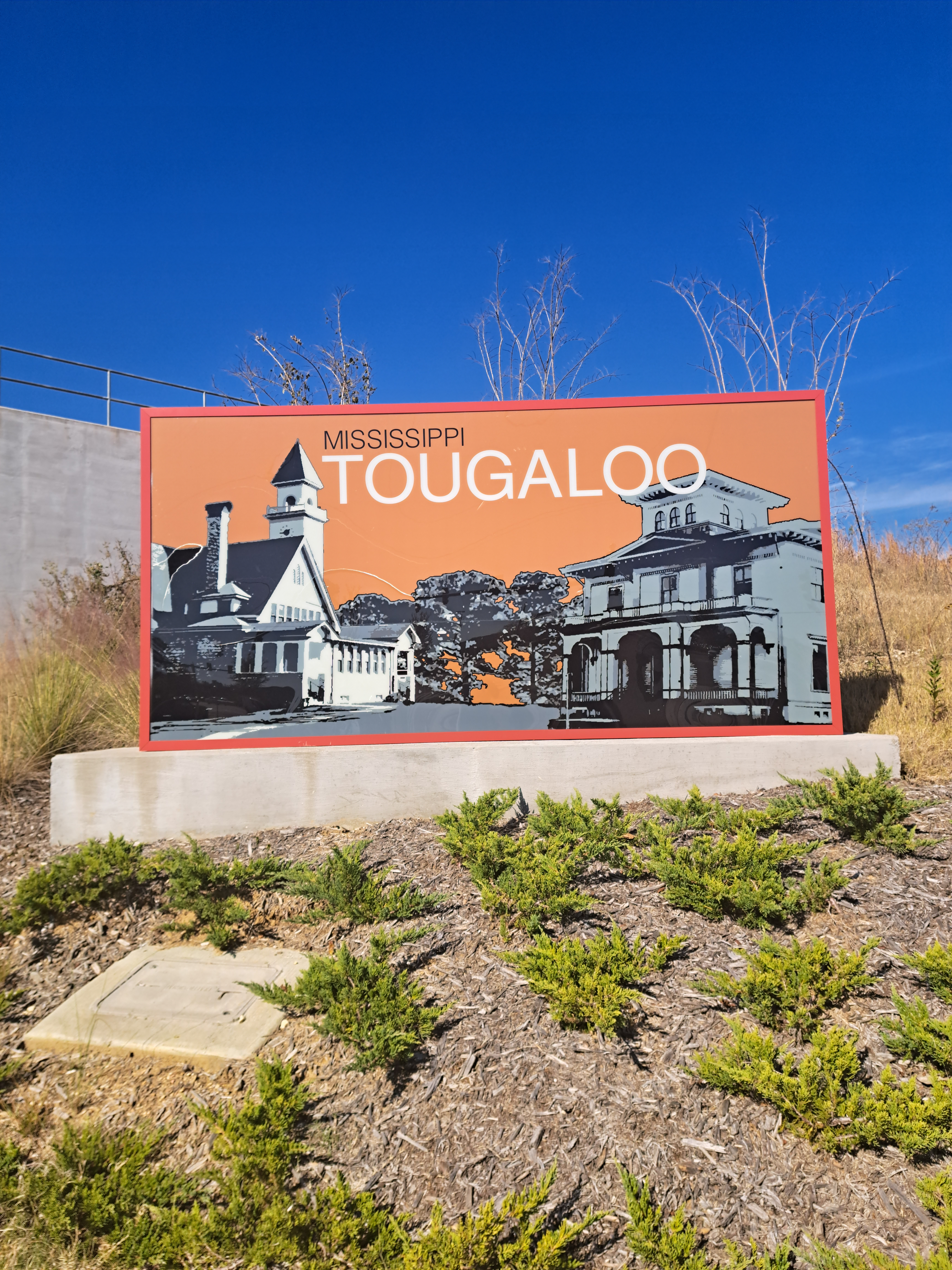

- Location within Mississippi Location within the United States
- Coordinates: 32°23′52″N 90°09′32″W
- Country: United States
- State: Mississippi
- County: Hinds
- Elevation: 351 ft (107 m)
- Time zone: UTC-6 (Central (CST))
  - Summer (DST): UTC-5 (CDT)
- ZIP code: 39174
- Area codes: 601, 769
- GNIS feature ID: 678828

Tougaloo (TUG-a-lu) is an area in Jackson and in Hinds County, Mississippi. Its ZIP Code, 39174, is assigned to the area encompassing Tougaloo College, which is in Madison County.

The U.S. Postal Service operates the Tougaloo Post Office.

== Name ==
The name, Tougaloo, is believed to be derived from Choctaw, "atukla" meaning "second" or "tuklo" meaning "two" and perhaps originally "bok atukla" meaning "second creek".

== Education ==
The Tougaloo settlement in Hinds County is within the Jackson Public School District.

The Tougaloo College campus includes housing for faculty, and dependent children living with faculty on campus would be zoned to the Madison County School District. It is zoned to Ann Smith Elementary. Residents are in turn zoned to Highland Elementary School, Olde Town Middle School, and Ridgeland High School.

== Notable people ==
Actress Aunjanue Ellis was raised in Tougaloo.
