= List of Zeta Phi Beta members =

Zeta Phi Beta was founded in 1920, on the campus of Howard University in Washington, D.C. The sorority was incorporated in Washington, D.C., on March 30, 1923. In 1939, the sorority was incorporated in Illinois. Below is a list of some of the notable members of Zeta Phi Beta sorority.

== Activism and nonprofits ==
Name	Original chapter	Notability	Ref.
Ophelia Settle Egypt	Alpha	Social worker and pioneer in family planning among economically disadvantaged African American families	
Elizabeth Fouse		Founder of the Phyllis Wheatley YWCA; former president of the Kentucky Association for Colored Women; social activist	
Nettie Napier	Honorary	African American women's rights activist	
Elisabeth Omilami	Honorary	Human rights activist and CEO of Hosea Feed the Hungry and Homeless	
Lucille Norville Perez	Nu Xi Zeta	Physician known for her work in substance abuse and HIV/AIDS prevention; her research at the National Medical Association showed that people of color were stereotyped in medical treatment	
Ruth Tappe Scruggs		Clubwoman, national president of the Zeta Phi Beta and a founder the Niagara-Buffalo chapter of The Links	
Arizona Cleaver Stemons	Alpha	Social worker with the Society for the Prevention of Cruelty to Children and the Philadelphia Department of Public Welfare; founder and national president of Zeta Phi Beta	
Sallie Wyatt Stewart		First African American woman to hold an office in the National Council of Women and the only Black delegate sent to the International Council of Women in Vienna, Austria, in 1930	

== Business ==
Name	Original chapter	Notability	Ref.
Freddye Henderson		First Black woman to own a travel business in the U.S.	
Marjorie Joyner		First African-American woman to receive a patent, inventor of a permanent hair-wave machine, sales representative for Madam C. J. Walker cosmetics, and instructor and national advisor for Madam Walker's beauty schools	
Annie Turnbo Malone		First Black woman millionaire; cosmetics business owner and inventor	
Clara McLaughlin		President and CEO of East Texas Television; first Black woman to own and operate a television station.	
Maggie Lena Walker	Honorary	First African American female bank president to charter a bank in the United States	

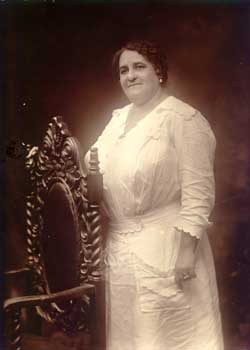
Maggie Lena Walker

== Education ==
Name	Original chapter	Notability	Ref.
Anita Turpeau Anderson		Faculty at James Adams Community School in Coatesville, Pennsylvania; director of the Wesley Foundation at Howard University	
Linda Royster Beito	Iota Eta	Chair of the Department of Social Sciences at Stillman College	
Stella Brewer Brookes	Epsilon Zeta	Chair of the Department of English at Clark Atlanta University	
Nellie A. Buchanan		Latin and drama teacher at Frederick Douglass High School; director with the Negro Little Theater of Baltimore, Maryland; former Zeta Phi Beta national president	
Alice Dugged Cary	Beta	First president of the Auburn Avenue Research Library in Atlanta, second president of Morris Brown College, former State Chairman of the Colored Woman's Committee, and former president of the Georgia State Federation of Coloured Women; established the first free Black kindergarten in Macon, Georgia and Charleston, South Carolina	
Adelaide Casely-Hayford	Honorary	Established a school for girls in 1923 to instill cultural and racial pride during the colonial years under British rule; activist for cultural nationalism, educator, short story writer, and feminist	
Lulu Vere Childers		Founder and director of the School of Music at Howard University	
Fannie R. Givens		Head of the Art Department at Simmons University and portrait artist	
Viola Tyler Goings	Alpha	Mathematics teacher in Springfield, Ohio and Smithfield, North Carolina; a founder of Zeta Phi Beta	
Joanna Houston	Alpha	Assistant dean of women at Howard University; president and incorporator of Zeta Phi Beta	
Elizabeth Koontz		First African-American president of the National Education Association; former director of the Women’s Bureau	
Elmira Mangum	Kappa Epsilon Zeta	President of Florida A&M University	
Pearl Neal	Alpha	Music teacher in the Winston-Salem, North Carolina public schools and director of the senior music majors at the Winston-Salem Teachers College; founder of Zeta Phi Beta	
Evelyn Pope	Omicron Zeta	Dean of Library Sciences at North Carolina Central University	
Joanna Houston Ransom		English instructor, college administrator, and assistant dean of women at Howard University; former Zeta Phi Beta national president	
Lucy Harth Smith		Executive council of the Association for the Study of African American Life and History; educator, writer, and activist who worked to challenge inequality in the Kentucky public school system	
Deborah Wolfe		Head of the Department of Elementary Education and the director of the Graduate Studies Program at Tuskegee Institute, professor of education and chairperson for the admissions committee at Queens College; education chief of the Committee on Education and Labor in the United States House of Representatives	

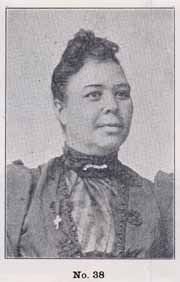
Alice Dugged Cary

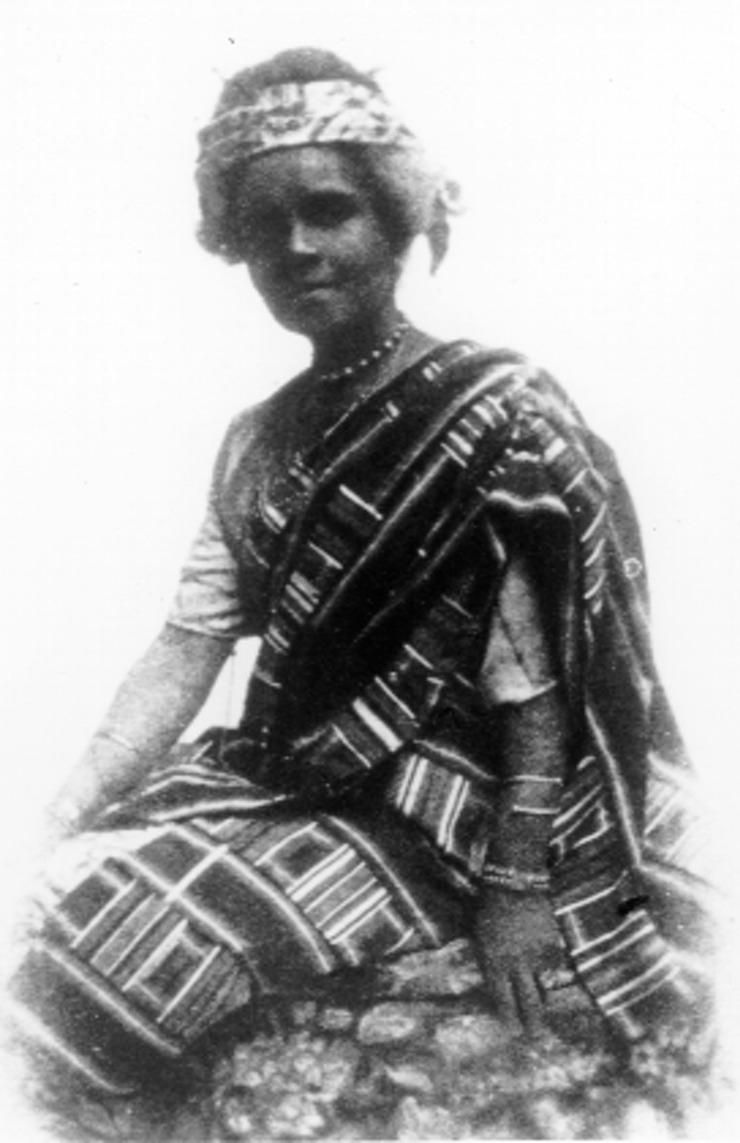
Adelaide Casely-Hayford

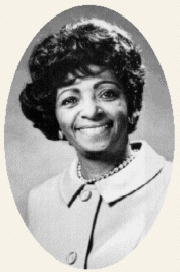
Elizabeth Koontz

== Entertainment ==
Name	Original chapter	Notability	Ref.
Tatyana Ali	Honorary	Actress and singer known for The Fresh Prince of Bel-Air	
Danielle Belton	Delta Kappa	Editor-in-chief at The Root; blogger and creator of Black Snob	
Rhona Bennett	Honorary	Actress known for The Jamie Foxx Show and singer with En Vogue	
Towanda Braxton	Omicron Gamma	Singer and television personality know for the Braxton Family Values	
Traci Braxton	Omicron Gamma	Singer, radio personality, and television personality know for the Braxton Family Values personality	
Grace Bumbry		Opera singer	
Ellabelle Davis		Musician and opera singer	
Ja'net DuBois	Honorary	Actress and singer	
Lillian Evanti	Honorary	Opera singer; first African American to sing grand opera professionally	
Vivica A. Fox	Honorary	Actress	
Leela James	Honorary	Singer and television personality known for R&B Divas: Los Angeles	
Syleena Johnson	Lambda Epsilon	Singer	
Chaka Khan	Honorary	Grammy Award-winning singer/musician	
Dawnn Lewis	Honorary	Actress	
Dawnette Lounds-Culp		Author, talk radio show host	
Stephanie Mills	Honorary	Singer	
Minnie Riperton	Honorary	Singer and songwriter	
Esther Rolle	Honorary	Actress best known for her portrayal of Florida Evans on Maude and Good Times	
Kathleen Mary Easmon Simango	Honorary	First African-American woman to earn a diploma from the Royal College of Arts; singer, dancer, opera singer	
Tonea Stewart	Epsilon Beta	Actress best known for her role as Aunt Etta on In the Heat of the Night	
Angie Stone	Honorary	Singer and television personality known for R&B Divas: Atlanta	
Lou Swarz	Xi Zeta	Actress, journalist, beauty consultant, and radio show host	
Sheryl Underwood	Zeta Tau Zeta	Comedian and international president of Zeta Phi Beta	
Sarah Vaughan	Honorary	Jazz singer	
Dionne Warwick		Singer	

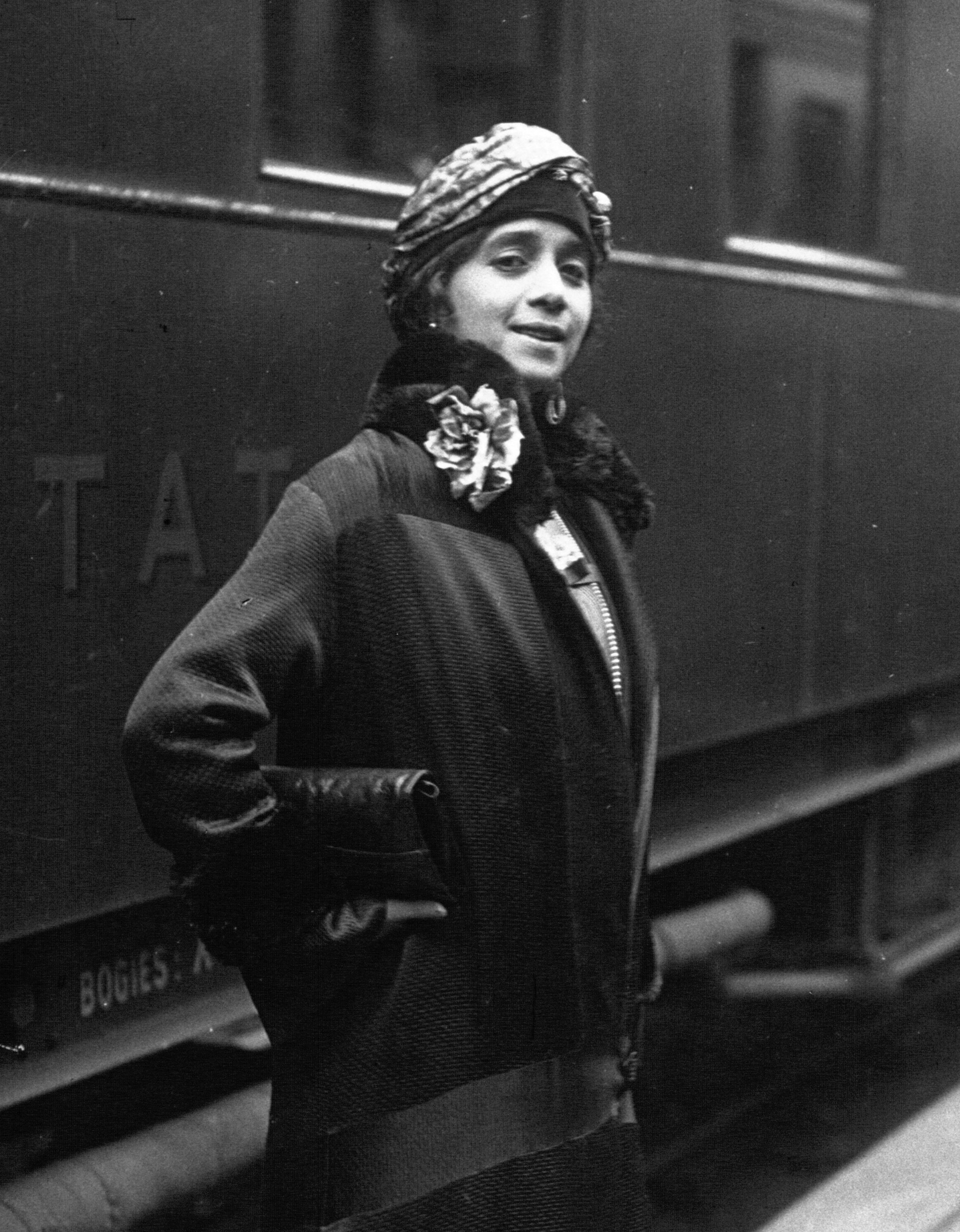
Lillian Evanti

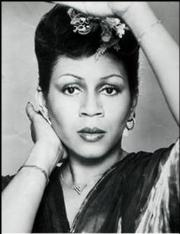
Minnie Riperton

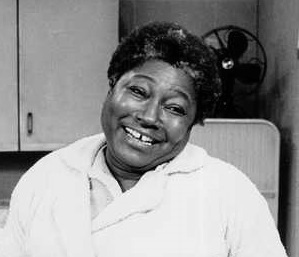
Esther Rolle

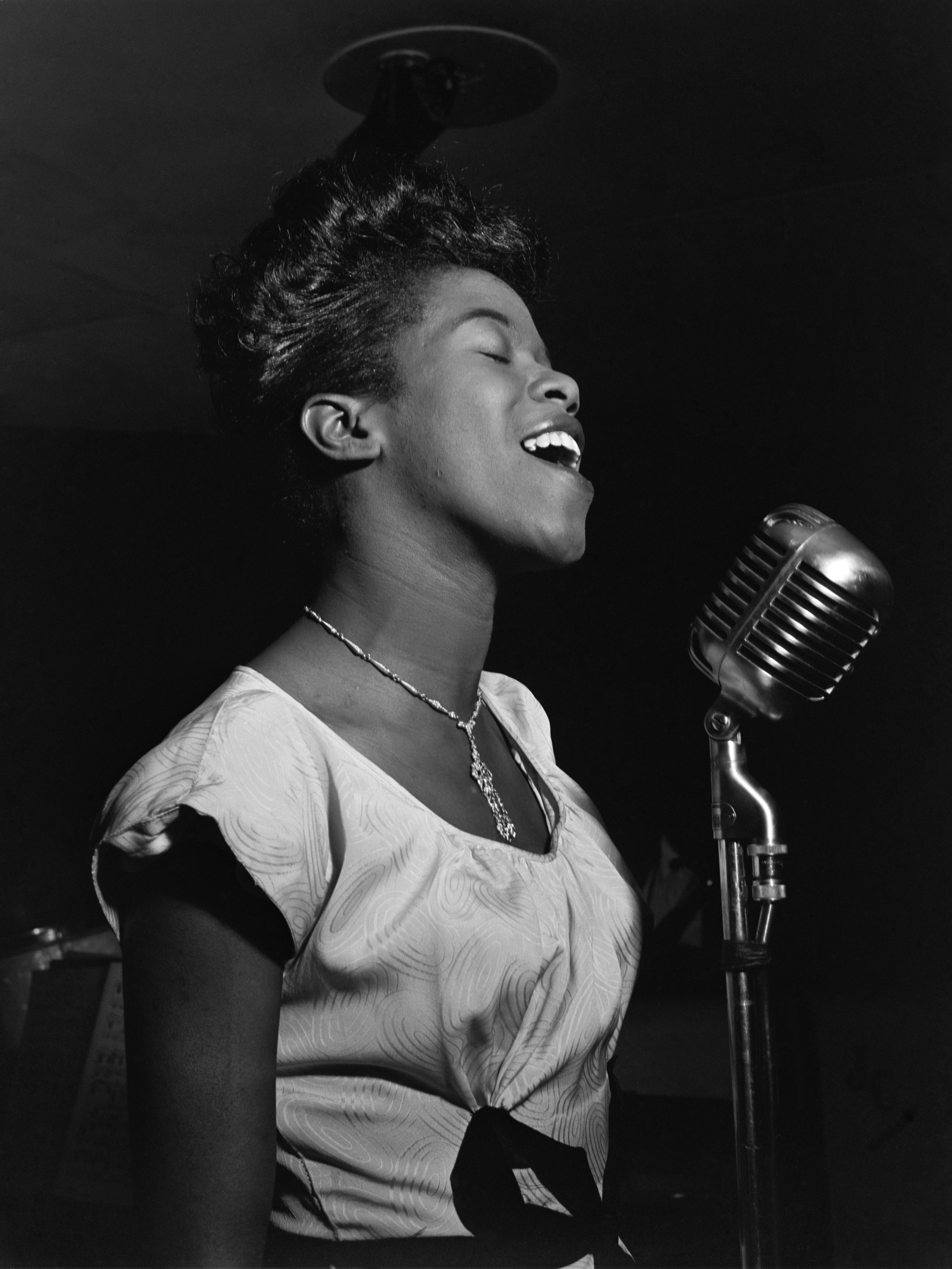
Sarah Vaughan

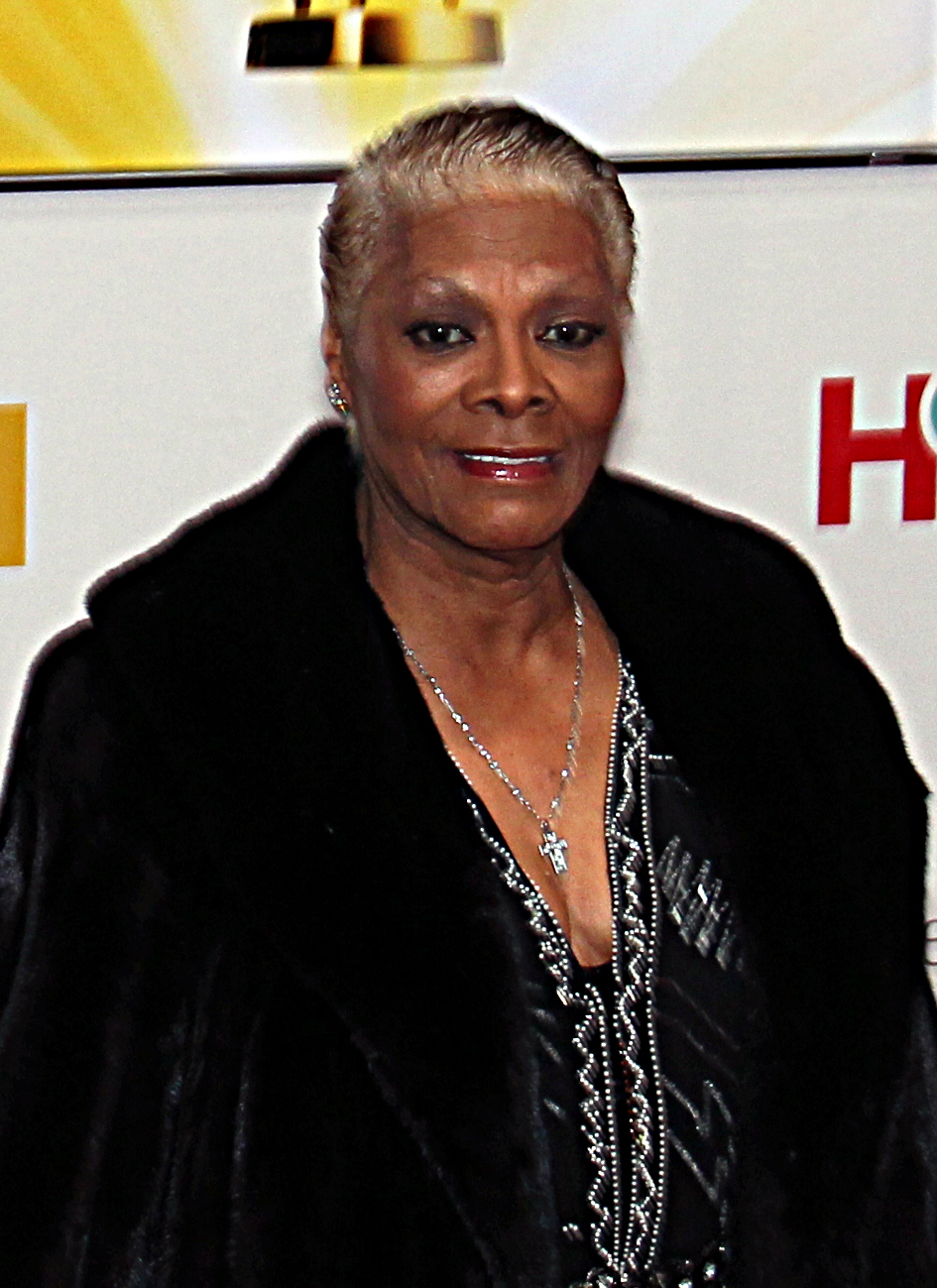
Dionne Warwick

== Law ==
Name	Original chapter	Notability	Ref.
Violette Neatley Anderson		First African-American woman to practice law before the United States Supreme Court; former Zeta Phi Beta national president	
Bernice B. Donald	Alpha Eta Zeta	Senior Judge of the United States Court of Appeals for the Sixth Circuit; Judge of the United States District Court for the Western District of Tennessee	
Anita Hill	Honorary	Attorney, law professor, and civil rights activist; plaintiff in sexual harassment case vs. Clarence Thomas	
Bernette Johnson		Chief justice of the Louisiana Supreme Court	
Autherine Lucy		Plaintiff in the U.S. Supreme Court case styled Lucy v. Adams, which prevented the University of Alabama from denying admission solely based on race or color	
Edith S. Sampson		Lawyer and associate judge for Circuit Court of Cook County; first Black woman to be elected as a judge in Illinois, to represent the U.S. at the United Nations, and to be a U.S. delegate to NATO	

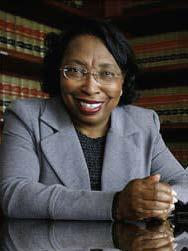
Bernice B. Donald

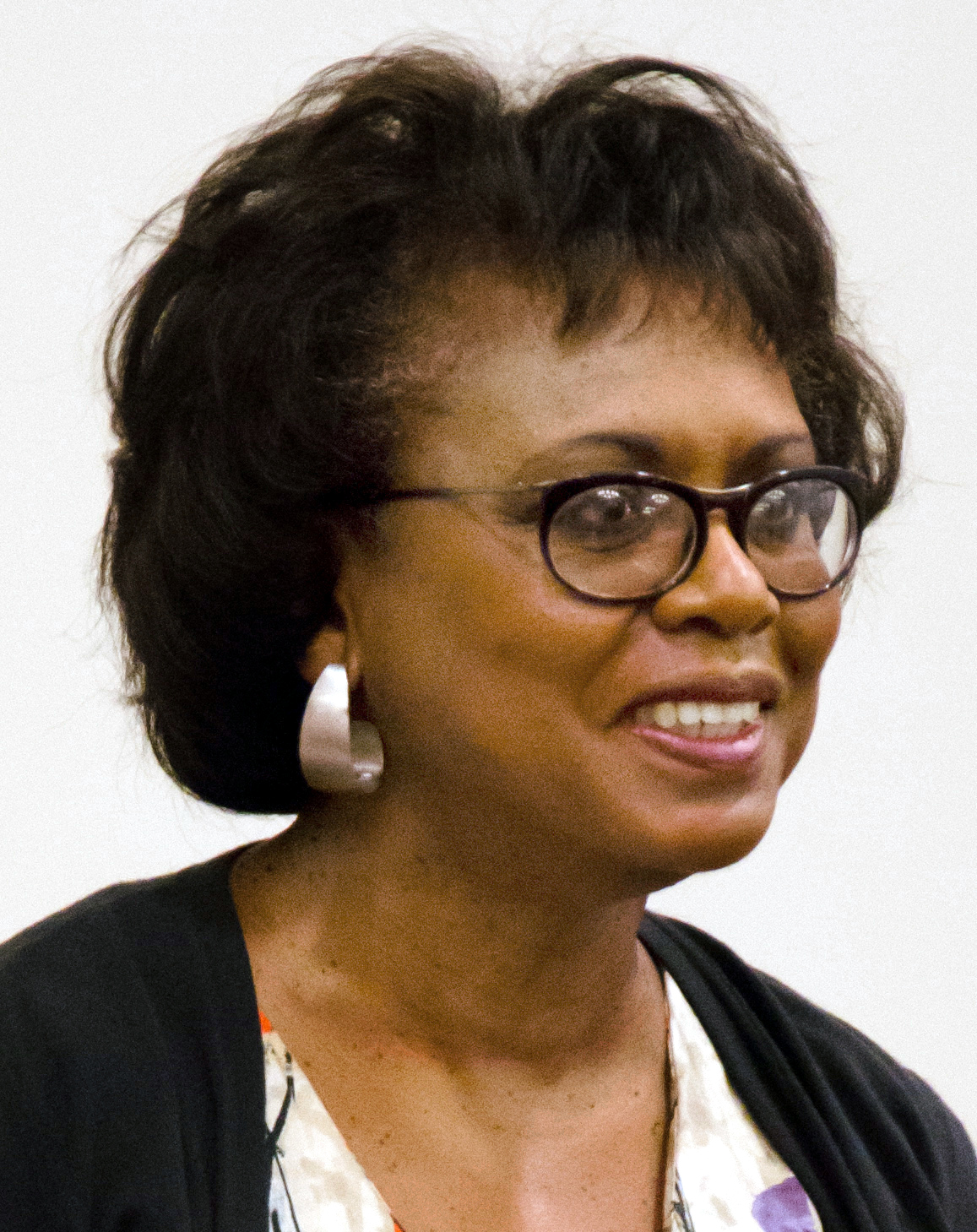
Anita Hill

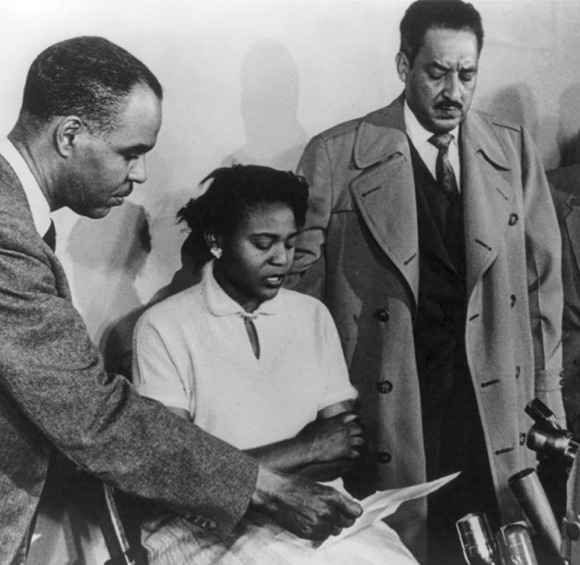
Autherine Lucy

== Literature and journalism ==
Name	Original chapter	Notability	Ref.
Moe Anderson	Nu Iota	Author, journalist, and publisher	
Linda Goss		First African-American storyteller to receive a National Heritage Fellowship from the National Endowment of the Arts; Storyteller, Author; co-founder of the National Association of Black Storytellers	
Zora Neale Hurston	Alpha	Folklorist and author during the Harlem Renaissance, best known for her 1937 novel Their Eyes Were Watching God	

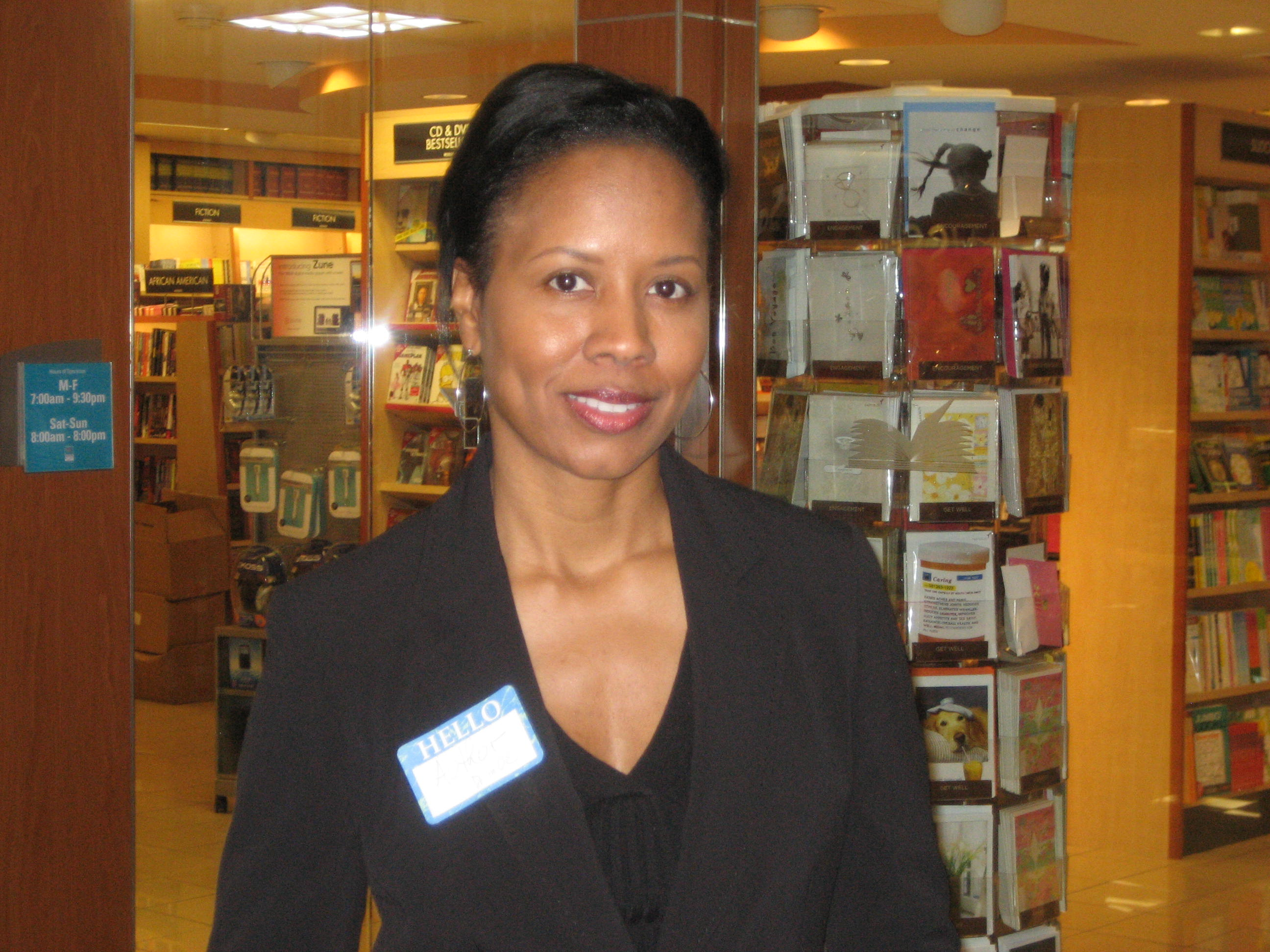
Moe Anderson

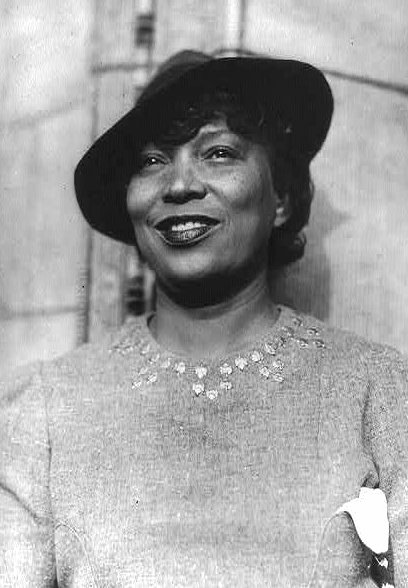
Zora Neale Hurston

== Military ==
Name	Original chapter	Notability	Ref.
Evelyn J. Fields		Rear Admiral; NOAA director with Marine and Aviation Operations	
Lillian E. Fishburne		First African-American female to hold the rank of Rear Admiral in the United States Navy	

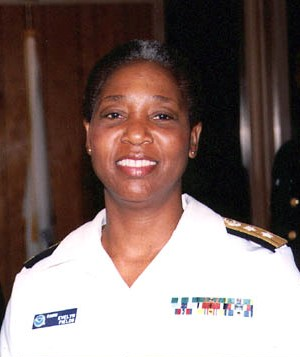
Evelyn J. Fields

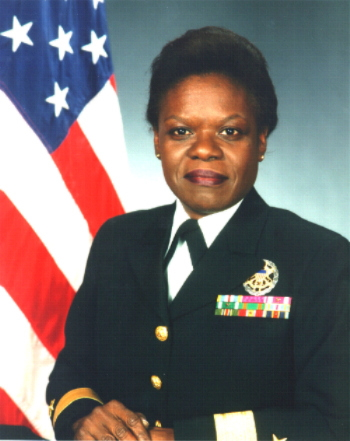
Lillian E. Fishburne

== Politics ==
Name	Original chapter	Notability	Ref.
Barbara West Carpenter	Beta Alpha	Louisiana House of Representatives; former Zeta Phi Beta president	
Julia Carson		Omicron PiUnited States House of Representatives	
Donna Edwards	Honorary	United States House of Representatives	
Sydney Kamlager-Dove	Gamma Lambda	United States House of Representatives, California State Senate, and California State Assembly	
Mary E. McAllister		North Carolina General Assembly	
Yvonne B. Miller		Virginia Senate and Virginia House of Delegates	
Christale Spain	Phi Pi	Chair of the South Carolina Democratic Party	
Beatrice Welters	Nu Xi Zeta	United States Ambassador to the Republic of Trinidad and Tobago	
Cynthia Willard-Lewis		Louisiana State Senator, Louisiana House of Representatives, and New Orleans City Council	
Sharon R. Wilson		President of the Senate of the Bahamas	

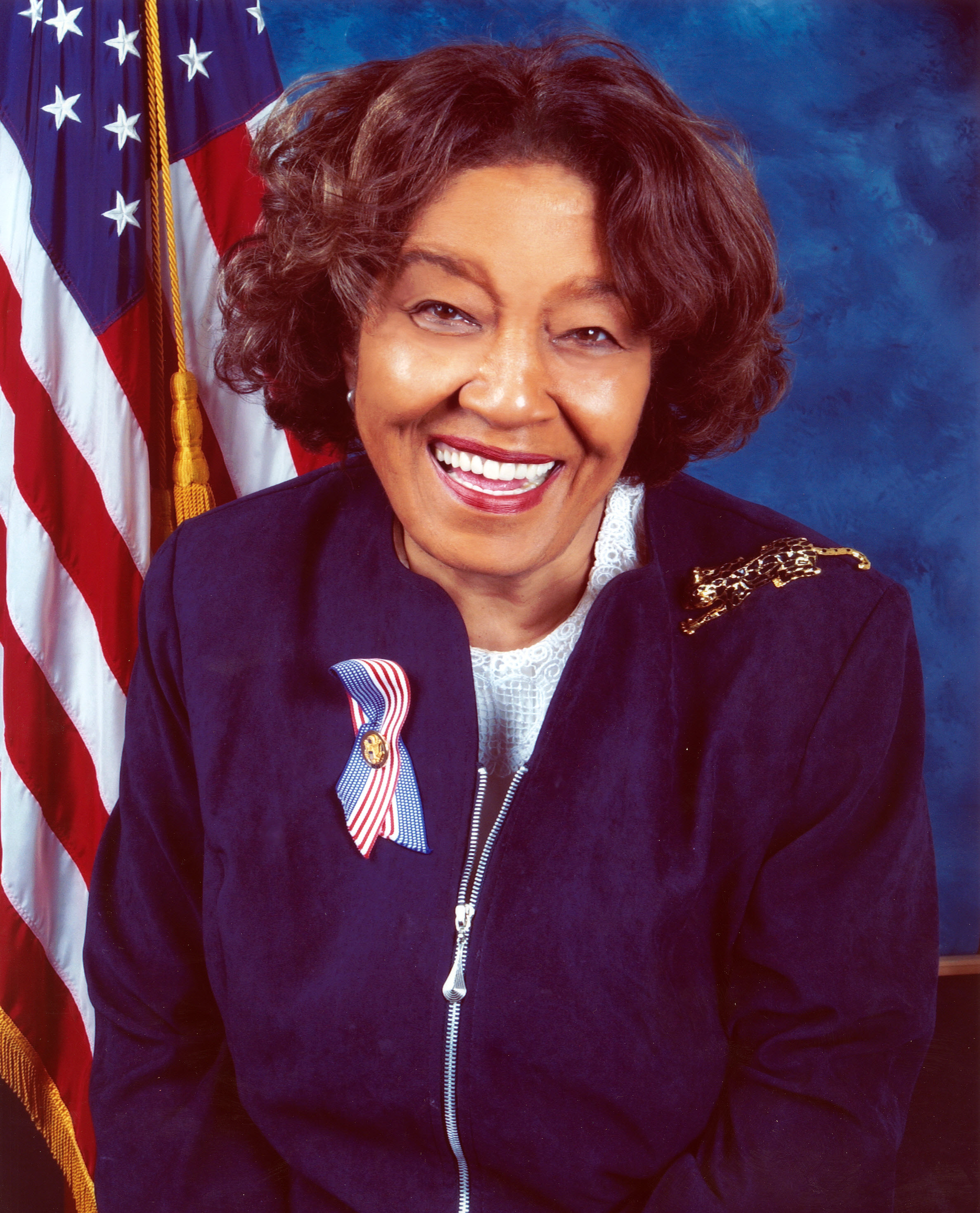
Julia Carson

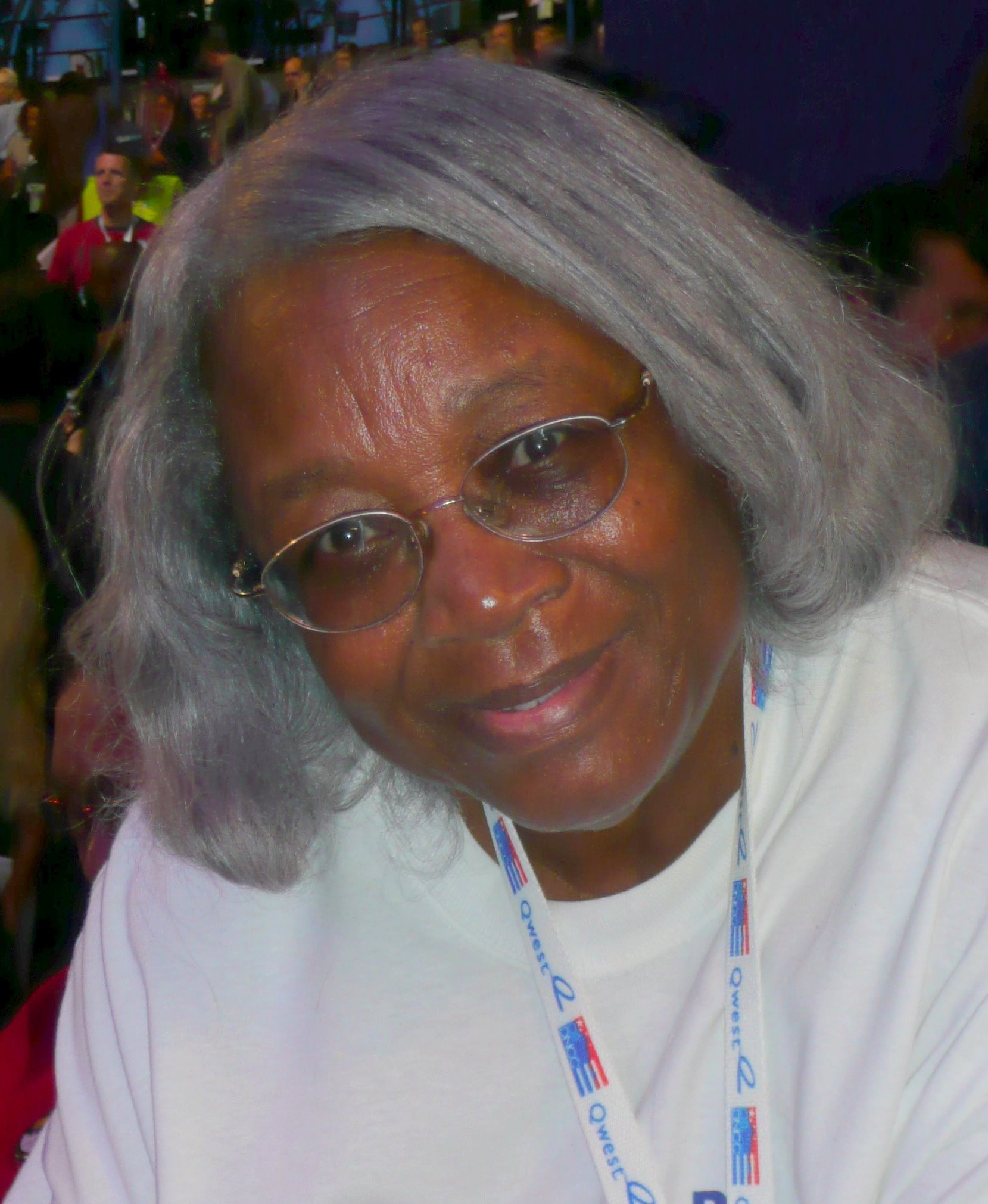
Yvonne Miller

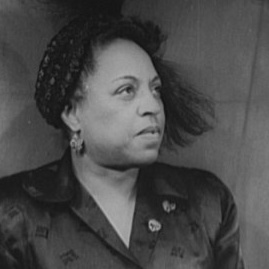
Edith S. Sampson

== Sports ==
Name	Original chapter	Notability	Ref.
Amber Campbell		Three-time Olympic hammer thrower; gold medalist at the 2015 NACAC Championships in Athletics	
Camille Cooper	Epsilon Kappa	Professional basketball player with the New York Liberty	
Rhyne Howard	Iota Mu	Professional basketball player with the Atlanta Dream	
Flora Hyacinth	Iota Eta	Competitive triple jump and hurdles athlete for the United States Virgin Islands	
Lillie Leatherwood	Iota Eta	Track and field athlete who medaled in the 1984 Summer Olympics and the 1988 Summer Olympics in the 4 × 400 m relay	
Wendy Palmer	Tau Theta	Professional basketball player with the Utah Starzz, the Orlando Miracle, and the San Antonio Silver Stars; head women's basketball coach at the University of North Carolina at Greensboro	
Chantel Tremitiere	Gamma Xi	Professional basketball player with the Sacramento Monarchs, the Utah Starzz, and the Indiana Fever	
DeMya Walker	Tau Theta	Professional basketball player with the Sacramento Monarchs, the Connecticut Sun, and New York Liberty	
Mistie Williams	Nu Omicron	Professional basketball player with the Houston Comets, the Chicago Sky, Connecticut Sun, the Phoenix Mercury, and Canberra Capitals	

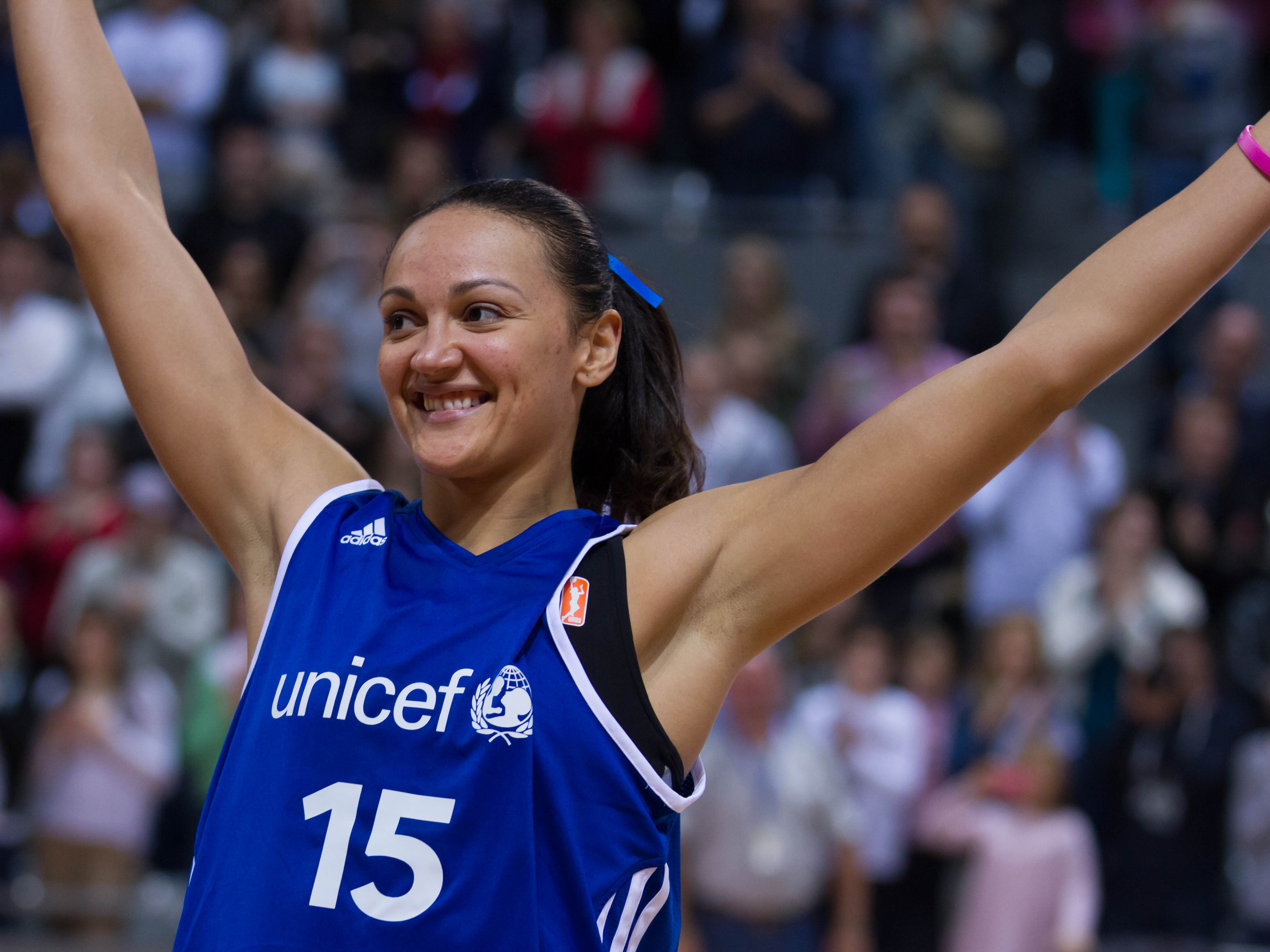
Mistie Williams
