= Ransom (disambiguation) =

Ransom is the practice of holding a prisoner to extort money or property to secure their release, or it can refer to the sum of money involved.

Ransom or The Ransom may also refer to:

== People ==
- Ransom (surname)
- Ransom (given name)

== Places in the United States ==
- Ransom, Illinois, a village
- Ransom, Kansas, a city
- Ransom, Kentucky, an unincorporated community
- Ransom, Minnesota, an unincorporated community
- Ransom County, North Dakota
- Ransom Township (disambiguation)
- Ransom House (disambiguation), various buildings on the National Register of Historic Places

== Film and television ==
- The Ransom (1915 film), a lost American silent drama
- Ransom (1928 film), a lost American silent film
- Ransom!, a 1956 American film starring Glenn Ford
- Ransom (1974 film), a British film starring Sean Connery
- The Ransom (1977 film), an American thriller film starring Oliver Reed
- Ransom (1996 film), an American remake of the 1956 film, starring Mel Gibson
- Ransom Stoddard, protagonist of the 1962 western The Man Who Shot Liberty Valance, played by James Stewart
- Ransom (TV series), a 2017 Canadian TV series
- "Ransom" (Brooklyn Nine-Nine), a 2020 episode of Brooklyn Nine-Nine
- "The Ransom", a 1970 episode of Hawaii Five-O
- "The Ransom", a 1967 episode of The Invaders
- "The Ransom", a 1966 episode of Mission: Impossible

== Music ==
- "Ransom" (Pendulum song), by Australian band Pendulum
- "Ransom" (Lil Tecca song), by American rapper Lil Tecca
- "Ransom", a song by Avion 1986
- The Ransom (EP), a 2004 EP by Cartel, or the title song
- "The Ransom", a song by Escape the Fate from There's No Sympathy for the Dead

== Novels ==
- Ransom (Cleary novel), a 1973 novel by Jon Cleary
- Ransom (Duncan novel), a 1966 novel by Lois Duncan
- Ransom (Garwood novel), a 1999 novel by Julie Garwood
- Ransom (Malouf novel), a 2009 novel by David Malouf
- Ransom (Steel novel), a 2004 novel by Danielle Steel
- Ransom Trilogy or The Space Trilogy, a 1938–1945 series of novels by C. S. Lewis
- Ransom, a 1985 novel by Jay McInerney

== Other uses ==
- Crucifixion of Jesus
- USS Ransom (AM-283), a United States Navy minesweeper during World War II
- Ransom School for Boys, a school in Florida that in 1975 merged with a girls' school to become Ransom Everglades
- Ransom (comics), Marvel Comics character

== See also ==
- Ransom Room (El Cuarto del Rescate), a small room in Peru where the Inca Emperor Atahualpa was imprisoned by the Spaniards
- Ransome (disambiguation)
- Ramsons, a wild relative of chives
- Ransomware (malware), a class of malware
- RANSUM (Royal Australian Navy School of Underwater Medicine), based at Sydney, Australia
- Threshold pledge system or ransom publishing model, a fund-raising system
