= Ransom (surname) =

Ransom or Ransome is an English surname, also found in some trade names and military company names; it might derive either from the noun "ransom" or from contraction of "Ranulf's son". Notable people with the surname include:

- Alured Ransom (1908–1992), American college football coach
- Ben Ransom (born 1992), English rugby union player
- Ben Ransom (musician), Australian country music songwriter and entertainer
- Bill Ransom (born 1945), American science fiction writer
- Brayton H. Ransom (1879–1925), American zoologist and parasitologist
- Brian Ransom (politician) (1940–2020), Canadian politician
- Brian Ransom (gridiron football) (born 1960), American player of gridiron football
- Britt Ransom (born 1987), American artist and academic
- Candice F. Ransom (born 1952), American author
- Caroline L. Ormes Ransom (1826–1910), American painter
- Cody Ransom (born 1976), American baseball player
- David M. Ransom (1938–2003), American diplomat
- Derrick Ransom (born 1976), American football player
- Dunbar R. Ransom (1831–1897), United States Army officer
- Dustin Ransom (born 1986), American musician and film composer
- Eliza Taylor Ransom (1863–1955), Canadian-American physician
- Emma S. Ransom (1864-1943), African-American educator and clubwoman
- Epaphroditus Ransom (1798–1859), American state governor and state supreme court justice
- Freeman Ransom (1880–1947), American lawyer, civil rights advocate, and businessman
- Gene Ransom (1957–2022), American basketball player
- Harry Ransom (academic administrator) (1908–1976), chancellor of the University of Texas System
- Harry Ransom (footballer) (born 1999), English professional footballer
- Henry Ransom (1911–1987), American golfer
- Holly Ransom (born 1990), Australian public speaker, author and curator
- James Ransom (born 1971), Canadian fencer
- James Ransom (Regulator) (c. 1740–1810), American sheriff and participant in the Regulator movement in colonial America
- Jane Ransom, American popular science writer
- Jeff Ransom (born 1960), American baseball player
- Jessica Ransom (born 1981), British actress and writer
- Joanna Houston Ransom (1897–1980), American educator
- John Crowe Ransom (1888–1974), American poet and academic
- Josephine Ransom (1879–1960), Australian Theosophist and writer
- Julia Ransom (born 1993), Canadian biathlete
- Kim Ransom, Colorado politician
- Kristen Ransom, American computer engineer and social entrepreneur
- Lathan Ransom (born 2002), American football player
- Matt W. Ransom (1826–1904), American state politician and Civil War general
- Melanie Ransom (living), Canadian politician
- Mike Ransom (born 1977), American musician
- P. J. G. Ransom (1935–2019), British non-fiction author
- Reverdy Cassius Ransom (1861–1959), African American Christian socialist, civil rights activist, and Methodist bishop
- Rhodesia Ransom, American politician
- Richard Ransom (1919–2016), American businessman
- Ro Ransom (born 1993), American rapper
- Robert Ransom Jr. (1828–1892), U.S. senator, civil engineer, and Civil War major general
- Roberto Ransom (born 1960), Mexican writer
- Robin Ransom (born 1967), American judge
- Ronald Ransom (1882–1947), American lawyer and businessman
- Samuel Ransom (1883–1970), American athlete
- Scott Ransom, American physician
- Sheila Kanieson Ransom (born 1954), American artist
- Shorty Ransom (1898–1959), American football coach and athletics administrator
- Terrell Ransom Jr. (born 2003), American actor
- Thomas E. G. Ransom (1834–1864), American surveyor, civil engineer, real estate speculator, and Civil War general
- Thomas Ransom (coach) (1870–1946), American football and basketball coach
- Truman B. Ransom (1802–1847), American educator and military officer
- Victor Ransom (1917—1998), English cricketer
- Victoria Ransom, New Zealand entrepreneur
- Willard Ransom (1916–1995), American lawyer, businessman, civic leader and civil rights activist
- William Ransom (1826–1914), British botanist, pharmacist and archaeologist
- William Henry Ransom (1824–1907), English physician and embryologist

== Fictional characters ==
- Elwin Ransom, in C. S. Lewis's Space Trilogy
- Michael Ransom, from the films Strike Commando and Strike Commando 2
- Captain Jack Ransom in Star Trek: Lower Decks

== See also ==
- Ransome (surname)
