= Ransome =

Ransome may refer to:

== People ==
- Ransome (surname)
- Ransome G. Holdridge (1836–1899), American painter
- Ransome Judson Williams (1872–1970), American politician and governor of South Carolina

== Other uses ==
- Ransome, Queensland, Australia, a suburb of Brisbane
- 6440 Ransome, an asteroid
- Ransome Airlines, a regional airline in the United States
- Ransome the Clown, a character from the game Thimbleweed Park

== See also ==
- Ransom (disambiguation)
- Ransomes, Sims & Jefferies, a major British work vehicle and machinery maker, ended 1998
