= Cecelia Cabaniss Saunders =

African-American civil rights activist and community leader

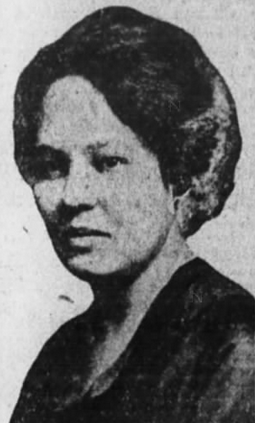
- Cecelia Cabaniss Saunders, from a 1923 newspaper.
- Born: Cecelia Hayne Holloway; 1879; Charleston, South Carolina
- Died: February 23, 1966
- Education: Fisk University, Columbia University, New School for Social Research
- Occupation: YWCA

Cecelia Cabaniss Saunders (1879 – February 23, 1966) sometimes written as Cecilia Cabaniss Saunders, was an African-American civil rights leader, and executive director of the Harlem, New York YWCA. She is best known for working against racial discrimination in wartime employment during World War II, for broader work training and opportunities for African-American women, and against police violence in Harlem.

== Early life and education ==
Cecelia Hayne Holloway was born in Charleston, South Carolina in 1879 (though some sources give 1883, she was listed in the 1880 census as an infant), daughter of James Harrison Holloway, a harness maker and school principal, and his wife Harriet Huger Holloway. She attended Avery Normal Institute, then Fisk University as an undergraduate, graduating in 1903, and pursued some graduate studies at Columbia University and the New School for Social Research.

== Career ==
As a young woman, Saunders taught at South Carolina State University.

Saunders became executive director of the Harlem YWCA in 1914. In that position, she worked with and nurtured African-American women leaders, including Elizabeth Ross Haynes, Anna Arnold Hedgeman (whom she hired in the 1920s as membership secretary), Dorothy Height, Emma Ransom, missionary Helen Curtis, Pauli Murray, Ruth Logan Roberts, Ella Baker and Eunice Carter. When she began as director, the Harlem YWCA was located in a private residence. When she retired in 1947, the institution was housed in a large complex with more than a hundred employees. The improvements she instituted included facilities for housing and summer camps. She also established a trade school there to train African-American women for jobs. She considered proper training a key step to overcome racial barriers in the workplace.

As director of the YWCA, Saunders testified to conditions in Harlem, especially conditions for women, at various hearings and before various commissions. In 1935, she spoke to the mayor's Commission on Conditions in Harlem, about women's work experiences with racial discrimination. In 1939, she was part of the work of the Committee on Street Corner Markets. She was also presented as a speaker at YWCAs and YMCAs in other cities. Her work was important to the move towards racial integration in the YWCA system in 1946.

In 1939, Tuskegee Institute recognized her work with an honorary Master of Science degree. The New York Age said of Saunders' career and its impact, "When a proper history of the development of Harlem in a period from 1914 to 1947 is written, Cecilia Cabaniss Saunders will have star billing."

== Personal life and legacy ==
Cecelia Holloway married twice. She married her first husband, dentist Dr. James E. Cabaniss, in August 1912; she was widowed before their first anniversary. She married her second husband John D. Saunders in 1915.

She died in 1966, at the age of 86.
