= Charles H. Roberts =

American dentist and politician (1872–1967)

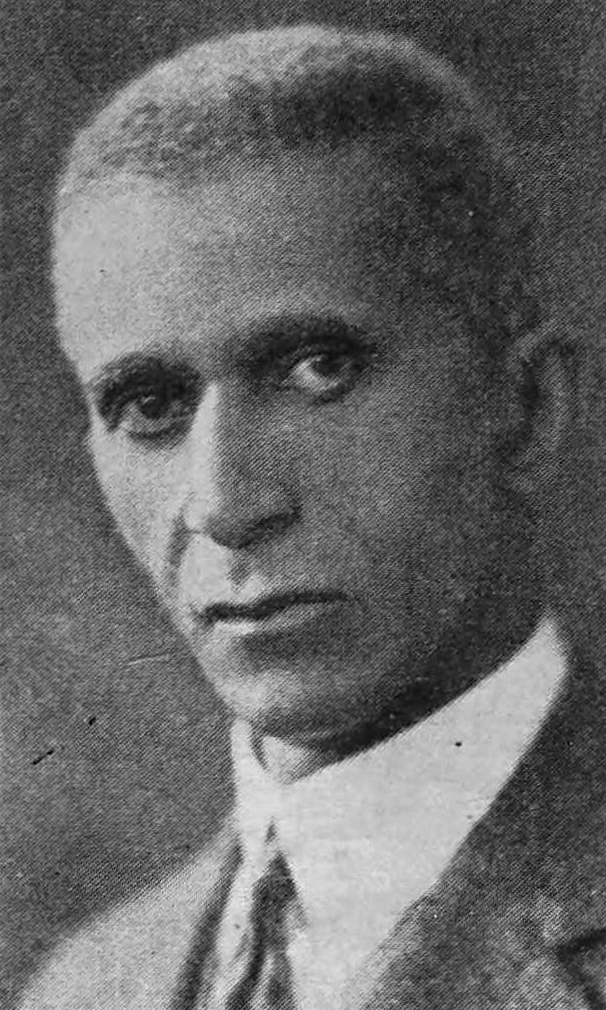
- Roberts c. 1924

Member of the New York City Board of Aldermen from the 27th district
- In office January 1, 1920 – December 31, 1921

Personal details
- Born: August 12, 1872 Louisburg, North Carolina, U.S.
- Died: January 1, 1967 (aged 94) New York City, U.S.
- Party: Republican
- Spouse: Hattie Beatrice Bailey (m. 1907)
- Children: Beatrice
- Relatives: Ruth Logan Roberts (sister-in-law)
- Occupation: Politician, dentist

Military service
- Allegiance: France
- Branch/service: French Army
- Years of service: 1915
- Unit: Medical Department
- Battles/wars: World War I

Charles Horace Roberts (August 12, 1872 – January 1, 1967) was an American dentist and politician who, alongside George W. Harris, was one of the first two African Americans elected to the New York City Board of Aldermen in 1919. He was also the first African American nominated for Congress by the Republican Party in a northern state, running as the party's unsuccessful candidate for New York's 21st district in 1924. (Note: According to The New York Age. The Age also claimed that Roberts was the first African American nominated for Congress in New York City, but this was not completely true; Reverdy C. Ransom, an independent, was nominated by the United Civic League in a 1918 special election.)

== Biography ==
Roberts's passport application, submitted May 11, 1915

A native of North Carolina, Roberts graduated from Lincoln University and the Temple University School of Dentistry, coming to New York City in 1894. He became president of the Manhattan Dental and Pharmaceutical Association and served in the Medical Department of the French Army during World War I.

Roberts was elected from the 27th aldermanic district in 1919, representing Harlem. During his tenure, he worked alongside assemblyman John Clifford Hawkins, U.S. Army colonels William Hayward and William Jay Schieffelin, and other civic leaders to secure an armory for the Harlem Hellfighters. In 1920, Roberts and Harris drew criticism from The Messenger for supporting the expulsion of five Socialists from the State Assembly. Roberts was defeated for reelection in 1921.

On August 5, 1924, the New York County Republican Party nominated Roberts for Congress in New York's 21st district. The decision was reportedly made to avoid African American defections to the Democratic Party. When Charles Gardner, a U.S. Army sergeant at Fort Hamilton, wrote to Calvin Coolidge requesting the president block Roberts's nomination, Coolidge responded, in part:

Our Constitution guarantees equal rights to all our citizens without discrimination on account of race or color. I have taken my oath to support that Constitution.... A colored man is precisely as much entitled to submit his name in a party primary as any other citizen. The decision must be made by the constituents to whom he offers himself and by nobody else....

During the campaign, Roberts was supported by the Reverend Adam Clayton Powell Sr. and Congressmen Martin C. Ansorge and Leonidas C. Dyer, but he was opposed by Universal Negro Improvement Association founder Marcus Garvey, who attacked him as a "selfish Negro" that had "nothing in common" with black workers. Roberts lost the election with 43% of the vote; despite strong support from black voters, white Republicans defected to incumbent Democrat Royal H. Weller by margins of two or three to one.

Following the Harlem riot of 1935, mayor Fiorello La Guardia appointed Roberts chairman of a committee to investigate the causes of the disturbance. They presented their report one year later, advising the city to avoid job discrimination, provide better resources to Harlem Hospital, and increase police accountability. La Guardia followed many of their recommendations.

== Personal life ==
Roberts married Hattie Beatrice Bailey on June 27, 1907. They had one daughter, Beatrice. Roberts's brother was Eugene Percy Roberts, a prominent black physician and politician in his own right, who was the first African American to receive a degree in medicine in New York City, serve as a member of the New York City Board of Education, and become a trustee of Lincoln University. Eugene's wife was Ruth Logan Roberts, herself a prominent activist and socialite.

== Works ==
- The Negro in Harlem: A Report on Social and Economic Conditions Responsible for the Outbreak of March 19, 1935. New York: The Mayor's Commission on Conditions in Harlem. 1935.
