= Harlem YWCA =

Building belonging to an American organization for women

The Harlem YWCA in New York, USA, was founded in 1905, moving to its own premises in 1921. It played an important role in developing training and careers for young black women in the early and mid twentieth century, as well as providing safe and respectable accommodation.

== Foundation and development ==
The foundation and development of the Harlem Young Women's Christian Association was led by Cecelia Cabaniss Saunders, Emma Ransom, and Virginia Scott, among others. Scott was the treasurer for thirty-one years and an active member of Mount Olivet Baptist church in New York for many years. Ransom was the president of the management committee. Saunders was the executive director from 1914 until 1947. The founders were well connected to the networks of both religious and practical organisations that had developed in Harlem, especially as the number of black citizens increased. They aimed to combine the social traditions of clubs and religion to benefit the community. The objective of the Harlem YWCA was to provide Christian family surroundings that supported the material and spiritual needs of young women so that they could advance their careers and place in society. It thus became a centre for community activism as well as religious outreach. It had its own motto The More Abundant Life.

The development of the Harlem YWCA reflected the tensions and change in American society between white and black citizens. Indeed, the YWCA movement was formally segregated on the basis of skin color until 1945, and the leaders of Harlem YWCA led demands for independence of YWCAs for black women from supervision by YWCAs for white women. This resulted in changes in the official organisational rules in 1946 to give self-governance to the YWCAs for black women.

== Premises and activities ==
The organization initially rented premises and mainly provided bible-study and a Sunday evening religious service. However, the founders responded to the demand and obvious need for secular support as well. In 1921 it re-opened in a purpose built building at 137th Street and Lenox Avenue after previously occupying rented premises. This building, funded by the Rockefellers, set a high standard for the YWCA. The building had a large cafeteria in the basement. The ground and first floor had an information desk and offices as well as reception, meeting and teaching rooms. On the higher floors there were a gymnasium with showers and a locker room as well as a laundry. There was a swimming pool on the fourth floor. An adjacent building provided the accommodation rooms for residents. By 1926 the Emma Ransom House could accommodate over 200 women and included a roof garden with lighting. There was some tension between the rules and well-meaning supervision provided for residents and their wish for an independent life. Later on, an annex was built providing more classrooms and a trade school was developed. Over 3000 students were enrolled by 1943. By 1947 the Harlem YWCA employed over a hundred people.

The Harlem YWCA provided training in domestic work in areas such as cooking and sewing, as well as how to balance the need to work with a successful home life. These skills made the women more competitive in the job market. In 1923, to expand the range of training, Emma Shields Penn was employed to lead the trade school. She had been employed previously at the U. S. Department of Labor. She expanded training into business skills such as shorthand, dictation bookkeeping and business English, as well as a beauty school and more domestic service skills. Madame C. J. Walker, the first woman to be well documented as a self-made millionaire in the USA, had been a member of the Harlem YWCA's management committee until her death, and her success through her beauty products company provided an example of a very successful woman. There was also a programme of cultural courses, with the content changing depending on their popularity and the availability of lecturers. It later expanded into nursing studies, that offered a formal state qualification including practical placements in hospitals from around 1939. The Harlem YWCA also opened an employment bureau from the mid-1930s and members of the organisation's committee began to promote better employment conditions, particularly for domestic staff. These employment-related activities were led by the then membership secretary Anna Arnold Hedgeman (who resigned in 1933). She also expanded the series of career and inspirational lectures, and was able to book women such as Mary Church Terrell, Charlotte Hawkins Brown and Maggie L. Walker.

== Residents at the Harlem YWCA ==
The accommodation was a fairly cheap, safe and respectable place for young black women to stay when temporarily in New York. This was particularly important in the earlier years of the Harlem YWCA. Among people known to have lived there was Leontyne Price, an opera singer, in 1948 while attending the Juilliard School.

== See also ==
- YWCA, Harlem, New York A silent film made in 1940 by the Harmon Foundation about the trade school. US National Archives Identifier: 94982
