= Ransom (given name) =

Ransom is a male given name which may refer to the following people:

- Ransom Cook (1794–1881), American inventor
- Ransom W. Dunham (1838–1896), U.S. Representative from Illinois
- Ransom Dunn (1818–1900), American minister and theologian
- Ransom L. Ford (1878–1973), American politician from Michigan
- Ransom H. Gillet (1800–1876), U.S. Representative from New York
- Ransom Halloway (1793–1851), U.S. Representative from New York
- Ransom C. Johnson (1849–1904), American politician from Michigan
- Ransom Asa Moore (1861–1941), American agronomist and professor
- Ransom B. Moore (1827–1904), California pioneer and Arizona Territory legislator
- Ransom A. Myers (1952–2007), American-Canadian marine biologist and conservationist
- Ransom E. Olds (1864–1950), American automotive industry pioneer, for whom both the Oldsmobile and REO brands were named
- Ransom Riggs (born 1979), American writer and filmmaker
- Ransom B. Shelden Sr. (1814–1878), founder of Houghton, Michigan
- Ransom Stephens, American physicist and writer

== See also ==
- Ransome G. Holdridge (1836–1899), American painter
- Ransome Judson Williams (1872–1970), American politician and 102nd governor of South Carolina
