= Ransom House =

Ransom House may refer to the following buildings:

- James H. Ransom House, Ottawa, Kansas, listed on the National Register of Historic Places in Franklin County, Kansas
- Ransom House (Crittenden, Kentucky), listed on the National Register of Historic Places in Boone County, Kentucky
- Ransom House (Ennis, Texas), listed on the National Register of Historic Places in Ellis County, Texas

== See also ==
- Edward Ransom Farmstead, Livestock and Equipment Barn, Midway, Arkansas, listed on the National Register of Historic Places in White County, Arkansas
- RansomHouse, a hacking group specialising in extortion malware
