= Emma S. Ransom =

Religious worker, clubwoman, activist (1864–1943)

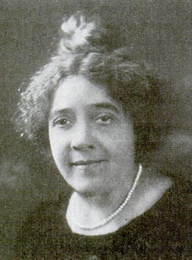
- Emma S. Ransom, from a 1924 publication.
- Born: Emma Sarah Connor; August 8, 1864; Selma, Ohio
- Died: May 15, 1943 (aged 78); Wilberforce, Ohio
- Occupations: clubwoman, administrator
- Years active: 1895–1943
- Known for: Chair of the Colored Women's YWCA in New York City, from 1909 to 1924
- Spouse: Reverdy C. Ransom (married 1886)

Emma S. Connor Ransom (August 8, 1864 – May 15, 1943) was an American educator and clubwoman, active in the African Methodist Episcopal Church (AME) and the YWCA (Young Women's Christian Association).

== Early life ==
Emma Sarah Connor (or Conner) was born in Selma, Ohio. She trained as a teacher at Wilberforce University as a young woman.

== Career ==
Ransom was an AME Church minister's wife after 1886, and moved to various cities with his work. She spoke to the annual meeting of the Woman's Mite Missionary Society in Cleveland in 1895, about mission work by African-American women in Africa. She addressed the Illinois Federation of Colored Women's Clubs in 1903, speaking on voting rights.

She moved to New York City when her husband became pastor of Bethel AME Church in 1907, and soon became involved in suffrage work and other women's club activities in the city. She spoke to the Equal Suffrage League in Brooklyn in 1908, at the invitation of Verina Morton Jones. From 1908 to 1911, she was president of the New York state branch of the Woman's Mite Missionary Society.

In 1909, Ransom was elected chair of the Colored Women's Branch of the YWCA, on 137th Street in Harlem, and served on the leadership board of the branch until 1924, working with Cecelia Cabaniss Saunders as general secretary. Ransom negotiated a $100,000 building fund for the branch. The program's residential component, including a cafeteria, meeting spaces, and an auditorium, was named the Emma Ransom House in her honor. In 1913, she presided over a celebration of the fiftieth anniversary of the Emancipation Proclamation at the YWCA. She also served on the Metropolitan Board of the YWCA in New York, and was the first black woman to hold a seat on that citywide board.

In 1938, Emma S. Ransom was awarded an honorary doctorate by Wilberforce University.

== Personal life ==
Emma S. Connor married Reverdy C. Ransom in 1886, as his second wife. They raised two sons, Harold and Reverdy Jr. She died in 1943, from a stroke, in Wilberforce, Ohio. Reverdy C. Ransom's papers are archived at Emory University, and at Reverdy C. Ransom Memorial Library, Payne Theological Seminary. She was also a member of Alpha Kappa Alpha sorority.

Ransom's great-great granddaughter is Britt Ransom, Associate Professor of Art at Carnegie Mellon University.
