= Dry Ridge, Kentucky =

- City
- Location of Dry Ridge in Grant County, Kentucky.
- Coordinates: 38°40′56″N 84°35′47″W
- Country: United States
- State: Kentucky
- County: Grant
- Established: 1792

Area
  - Total: 5.08 sq mi (13.16 km^{2})
  - Land: 5.05 sq mi (13.07 km^{2})
  - Water: 0.035 sq mi (0.09 km^{2})
- Elevation: 961 ft (293 m)

Population (2020)
  - Total: 2,102
  - Estimate (2022): 2,138
  - Density: 416.5/sq mi (160.81/km^{2})
- Time zone: UTC-5 (Eastern (EST))
  - Summer (DST): UTC-4 (EDT)
- ZIP code: 41035
- Area code: 859
- FIPS code: 21-22582
- GNIS feature ID: 2403510
- Website: cdrky.org

Dry Ridge is a home rule-class city in Grant County, Kentucky, in the United States. As of the 2020 census, Dry Ridge had a population of 2,102. From around 1910 to 1960, the city's economy was dominated by business related to its mineral water wells, purported to have healing properties.

== Geography ==
Dry Ridge is located north of the center of Grant County. It is bordered to the south by the city of Williamstown, the county seat. Interstate 75 passes through Dry Ridge, with access from Exit 159. I-75 leads north 35 miles (56 km) to Cincinnati and south 49 miles (79 km) to Lexington. U.S. Route 25 (Main Street) runs through the center of Dry Ridge, leading north 7 miles (11 km) to Crittenden and south 4 miles (6 km) to the center of Williamstown.

According to the United States Census Bureau, Dry Ridge has a total area of 4.6 square miles (11.8 km^{2}), of which 0.03 square miles (0.09 km^{2}), or 0.72%, is water.

== History ==
The community now known as Dry Ridge was settled about 1792 as "Campbell's Station" near a spring said to have medicinal qualities.

A post office called "Dry Ridge" was established in 1815 at an inn. Dry Ridge takes its name from a ridge surrounded by inns where travelers stopped for water before proceeding.

In 1909, the city was incorporated, the last incorporated in Grant County. That same year, a creamery company found mineral water which was believed to have medical properties. During the early part of the 20th century, Dry Ridge was the home of Kentucky Carlsbad Mineral Water Bottling Company, and home of the Carlsbad Hotel completed in 1911. People came to Dry Ridge from all over the eastern United States to take the mineral water of what was known as the Kentucky Carlsbad Springs, although it was not a spring, but a well. The hotel was destroyed by fire on February 25, 1927.

In 1937, a water distribution system was created with water from Williamstown, Kentucky's lake.

== Demographics ==
Historical population
Census	Pop.	Note	%±
1910	143		—
1920	129		−9.8%
1930	97		−24.8%
1940	257		164.9%
1950	640		149.0%
1960	802		25.3%
1970	1,100		37.2%
1980	1,250		13.6%
1990	1,601		28.1%
2000	1,995		24.6%
2010	2,191		9.8%
2020	2,102		−4.1%
2022 (est.)	2,138		1.7%
U.S. Decennial Census

=== 2020 census ===
As of the 2020 census, Dry Ridge had a population of 2,102. The median age was 34.1 years. 28.0% of residents were under the age of 18 and 12.2% of residents were 65 years of age or older. For every 100 females there were 89.4 males, and for every 100 females age 18 and over there were 89.1 males age 18 and over.

0.0% of residents lived in urban areas, while 100.0% lived in rural areas.

There were 815 households in Dry Ridge, of which 36.9% had children under the age of 18 living in them. Of all households, 38.8% were married-couple households, 17.9% were households with a male householder and no spouse or partner present, and 33.6% were households with a female householder and no spouse or partner present. About 29.7% of all households were made up of individuals and 9.4% had someone living alone who was 65 years of age or older.

There were 892 housing units, of which 8.6% were vacant. The homeowner vacancy rate was 1.6% and the rental vacancy rate was 4.5%.

Racial composition as of the 2020 census
Race	Number	Percent
White	1,931	91.9%
Black or African American	22	1.0%
American Indian and Alaska Native	3	0.1%
Asian	10	0.5%
Native Hawaiian and Other Pacific Islander	1	0.0%
Some other race	8	0.4%
Two or more races	127	6.0%
Hispanic or Latino (of any race)	52	2.5%

=== 2000 census ===
As of the census of 2000, there were 1,995 people, 771 households, and 535 families residing in the city. The population density was 428.2 inhabitants per square mile (165.3/km^{2}). There were 861 housing units at an average density of 184.8 per square mile (71.4/km^{2}). The racial makeup of the city was 97.19% White, 0.55% African American, 0.10% Native American, 1.30% Asian, 0.20% from other races, and 0.65% from two or more races. Hispanic or Latino of any race were 0.70% of the population.

There were 771 households, out of which 39.7% had children under the age of 18 living with them, 46.4% were married couples living together, 18.2% had a female householder with no husband present, and 30.5% were non-families. 26.6% of all households were made up of individuals, and 12.1% had someone living alone who was 65 years of age or older. The average household size was 2.51 and the average family size was 3.00.

In the city, the population was spread out, with 28.6% under the age of 18, 11.1% from 18 to 24, 29.3% from 25 to 44, 18.9% from 45 to 64, and 12.1% who were 65 years of age or older. The median age was 31 years. For every 100 females, there were 87.3 males. For every 100 females age 18 and over, there were 83.0 males.

The median income for a household in the city was $30,647, and the median income for a family was $32,202. Males had a median income of $38,000 versus $23,000 for females. The per capita income for the city was $14,568. About 21.0% of families and 23.5% of the population were below the poverty line, including 39.0% of those under age 18 and 14.4% of those age 65 or over.

== Education ==
Grant County students are served by Grant County Middle School and Grant County High School, both located in Dry Ridge.

== Notable people ==
- Lulu Vere Childers, African-American music educator
- Skeeter Davis (Mary Frances Penick, 1931–2004), country-pop (or Nashville sound) singer

== Climate ==
The climate in this area is characterized by hot, humid summers and generally mild to cool winters. According to the Köppen Climate Classification system, Dry Ridge has a humid subtropical climate, abbreviated "Cfa" on climate maps.
