= Joanna Houston Ransom =

American college administrator

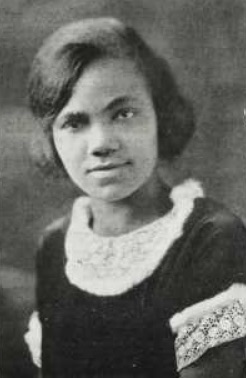
- Joanna Houston, from the 1924 Howard University yearbook.
- Born: Joanna Raynor Ransom; July 9, 1897; Windsor, North Carolina
- Died: September 1980 (aged 83); New York
- Occupations: English instructor, college administrator, clubwoman
- Relatives: Reverdy C. Ransom (grandfather-in-law)

Joanna Raynor Houston (July 9, 1897 (Note: Joanna Raynor Houston's birth year varies in primary and secondary sources. She is described as a two-year-old child in the 1900 United States Census, lending more weight to the 1897 date; via Ancestry) – September 1980), later Joanna Houston Ransom, was an American academic. She was an English instructor, college administrator, and assistant dean of women at Howard University. She was also the third Grand Basileus (president) of Zeta Phi Beta and a member of the National Pan-Hellenic Council of Presidents.

== Early life ==
Houston was born in Windsor, North Carolina, the daughter of Henry W. Houston and Emily Ward Houston. Her parents were both born in North Carolina; her father was a farmer and her mother was a seamstress. Her older brother Leopold died a soldier in France during World War I.

As a student at Howard University, Houston served on the student council, was a member of the debating team, and was editor of The Bison, the school's yearbook, in 1924. She was one of the first members of the Zeta Phi Beta (Zeta), serving as the sorority's third Grand Basileus (president) from 1922 to 1923. She went to graduate school at Columbia University, with further studies in English literature at Oxford and the University of Chicago.

== Career ==
Houston worked as secretary to Howard music educator Lulu Vere Childers. She was an English instructor at Delaware's State College for Colored Students, and assistant dean of women at Howard University, working with dean Lucy Diggs Slowe. Later she also taught English at Wilberforce University, and edited the Journal of Negro Education.

Ransom helped to found Zeta chapter at Wiley College in Texas, and was an active member of the alumnae chapter in Brooklyn, New York. She served on the National Pan-Hellenic Council of Presidents from 1940 to 1941, and as a national president voiced concerns that Black Americans must have equal and integrated roles in the military and defense industries during World War II.

== Personal life ==
Joanna Houston married clergyman Reverdy C. Ransom III in 1936; the ceremony was performed by the groom's grandfather, bishop Reverdy C. Ransom, in the garden of Lucy Diggs Slowe's home, and Houston was escorted down the aisle by Benjamin Mays, dean of Howard's school of religion. The Ransoms had two daughters born in Ohio, before they divorced in 1941. She died in 1980, aged 83 years, in New York.
