= Bert F. Crapser =

American politician (1874–1959)

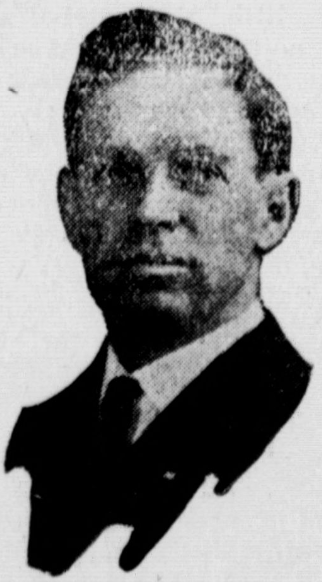

Member of the Michigan House of Representatives from the Genesee County 1st district
- In office January 1, 1913 – January 1, 1915
- Preceded by: Elmer G. Wheeler
- Succeeded by: Ransom L. Ford

Personal details
- Born: February 11, 1874 Swartz Creek, Michigan
- Died: February 18, 1959 (aged 85) Swartz Creek, Michigan
- Party: Progressive

Frederick Albertus Crapser (February 11, 1874 – February 18, 1959) was a Michigan politician.

== Early life ==
Crapser was born on February 11, 1874, in Swartz Creek, Michigan. Crapser was of German parentage.

== Career ==
Crapser was a farmer. On November 5, 1912, was elected to the Michigan House of Representatives where he represented the Genesee County 1st district from January 1, 1913, to January 1, 1915. In this election, he earned 1,513 votes as the Progressive candidate. Republican candidate Ransom L. Ford was in second place, earning 1,451 votes. On November 13, 1914, Ford defeated Crapser, who was vying for re-election. In the 1914 election, Ford earned 1,692 votes compared to Crapser's 353 votes.

== Personal life ==
Crapser was married.

== Death ==
Crapser died on February 18, 1959, in Swartz Creek.
