= Fannie R. Givens =

American artist and activist (1861–1947)

- Born: Fannie Rosalind Hicks; May 29, 1861 (disputed); Sturgeon, Missouri, U.S.
- Died: August 4, 1947; Louisville, Kentucky, U.S.
- Occupations: Artist, political activist, policewoman
- Spouse: James Edward Givens (m. 1895)

Fannie R. Givens (née Hicks; May 29, 1861 to August 4, 1947) was an artist, missionary, and political activist. Mainly a resident of Louisville, Kentucky, she created and taught art in many forms including painting and poetry and served as a policewoman for the city. Hicks was politically active in many different organizations, traveling around the world to advocate for Black and women's rights.

== Early life ==
Fannie Rosalind Hicks is believed to have been born on May 29, 1861, in Sturgeon, Missouri. However, there are several alternate years of birth listed on her documents, such as her death certificate listing 1876 and her headstone listing 1864. Another source cites her place and year of birth as Chicago, 1872. As a young child, she and her parents moved to Louisville, Kentucky.

On June 27, 1895, Hicks married James Edward Givens, a Harvard graduate and professor at State University, now known as Simmons College of Kentucky. She took her husband's name, becoming publicly known as Fannie R. Givens. Although the couple never had children of their own, the couple adopted James' niece and the fostered the four remaining siblings.

== Education ==
Givens attended high school in St. Louis and Chicago, although it is unknown which schools. She attended Knox College and graduated in 1892, popularly believed to be the first Black woman to graduate from the school of art. At the time, she listed her residence as Colorado Springs, Colorado. She also attended State University, Louisville Municipal College, and took a "correspondence course," as Givens describes, at Henry George School of Social Science NYC.

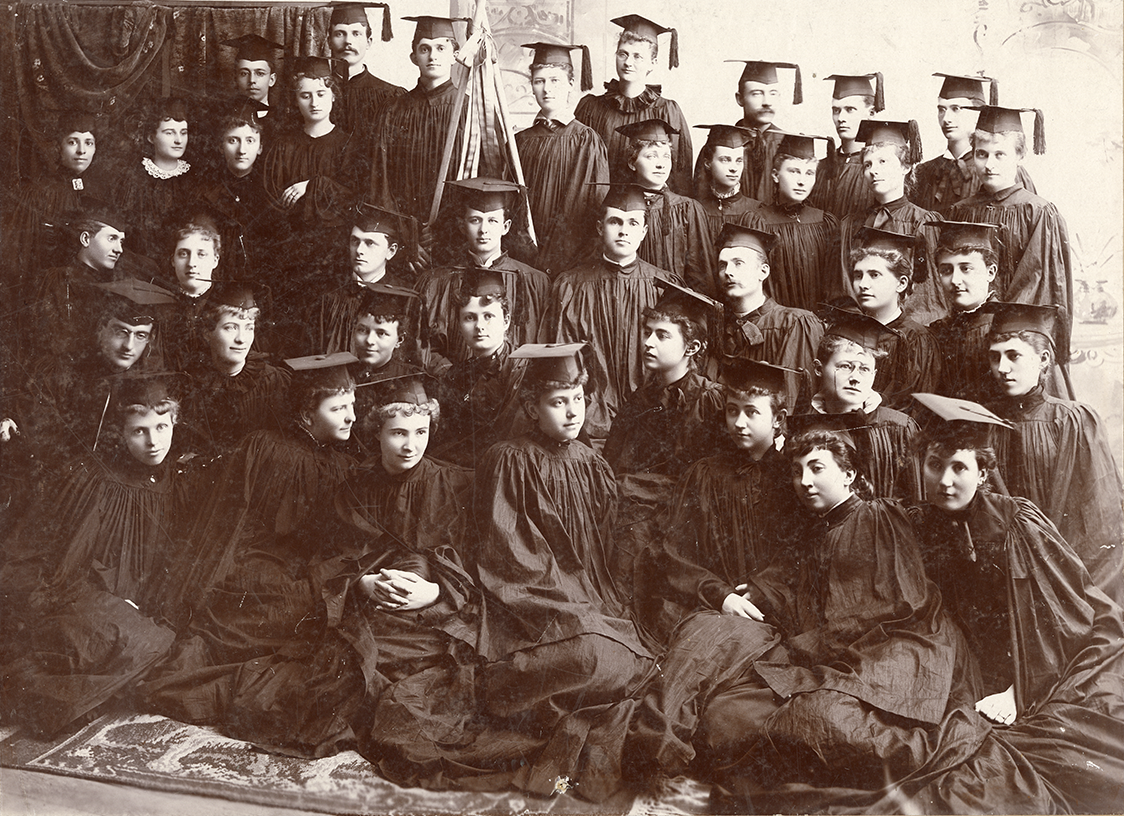
1892 Knox College graduates, Givens located at the fourth row from the top

== Career and art ==
After graduating from Knox, she returned to Louisville and served as the head of the art department at Simmons University, known at the time as State University. The department included 23 students and their art was featured in Chicago at the World's Columbian Exposition in 1893.

Givens was known for her portraits and presented a portrait of John Lewis Waller to President Benjamin Harris. The portrait was hung in the White House. She is also known for her portrait of Booker T. Washington. Because of her interest in African art, Prince Massaquoi honored Givens as a Princess, most likely when she traveled to Liberia. Givens' life-sized portrait of a woman referred to as Mrs. Talbert was hung in the Frederick Douglass Home.

Givens taught art from her home in Louisville and was the only Black person listed as an "artist and portrait artist" in the Louisville City Directory commercial ads. She also wrote poetry and songs. Her poem "Glimpses of the Old World" was held in the Congressional Library and she wrote many more. She copyrighted the song ""Hallelujah! Christ is Risen."

She did a large amount of traveling in Europe and Africa for the different organizations she was involved in, including the Baptist World Alliance and the National Association of Colored Women (NACW).

The Encyclopedia Titanica website reported that while aboard RMS Adriatic as second-class passengers, Givens and four others in her company were given a bad table at dinner the first night, alongside the band. Givens along with Doctor Camphor, a fellow black passenger, registered their complain to the purser Hugh McElroy who was, in her words, "very insulting" and said that "white folks were white folks and black folks were black folks and that the blacks would have to eat together." Givens went on a hunger strike for two days until her demands were met. Finally, Captain Edward Smith called for her on the third day. She said: "I declared that I had paid for the same privileges as the white passengers and would die before I would eat food on a ship under proscription." Smith asked what terms would satisfy her to which Givens said, "All I wanted was to be assigned to a table with the rest of the passengers regardless of color." Smith ordered that this be done and, per Givens, she was given the "best table" and that, after "three Southerners" got up and walked away, she found further support from other women passengers: "After I had gained my point I was surrounded by many white women, who made me tell of my travels abroad. Some of them locked arms with me and we walked on deck together. I had no further trouble on board after the third day at sea."

Givens was involved in organizations that united Black Americans, but she was also active in growing access to the arts. She was president and manager of the National Historical Art League, the head of the Art Department at State University and the head of the Kentucky Association of Colored Women. In 1918, Givens, Mary Virginia Cook Parrish, and William Spradling created an art school in a statuary hall with the National Historical Art League. Givens attempted to raise $100,000 to build an art institute for Black artists at Howard University, but unfortunately, not enough money was raised.

Being politically active in her community, Givens served as a GOP delegate from the 4th Ward beginning in 1921. In 1927, she was vocal about funding the Ohio River Bridge. That same year, Givens became Louisville's second Black policewoman. In 1938, Givens, along with three other women, were fired by Sam H. McMeekin, who was the Safety Director and claimed the women "had no specific duties." The women wrote an appeal, arguing that as women, they are not disadvantaged, but rather more helpful for work such as "rape cases, searching female prisoners, counseling children, and mediating family quarrels." Police Chief John M. Malley dismissed the appeal.

By 1935, she was the president for The World Union of Colored Women for Peace and International Concord. September 30, 1936, the Eta Zeta chapter of Zeta Phi Beta sorority honors Givens. She was the former Grand Basileus for the sorority and is listed as a notable Zeta Phi Beta sister.

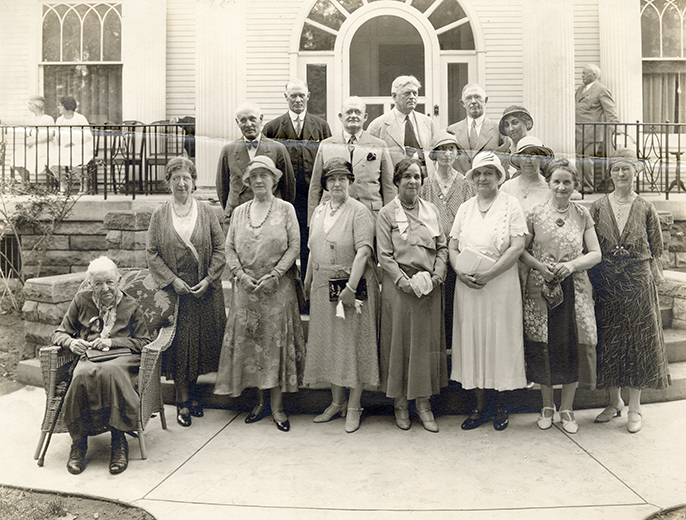
Givens at her Knox College Fifty Year Reunion, center bottom row

== Later life and death ==
In 1932, Givens attended the fifty year reunion at Knox College. In Louisville, she was a member of the 5th Street Baptist Church.

On August 4, 1947, Givens died in her home at 507 E. Finzer Street in Louisville from breast cancer. She was buried with her husband in Eastern Cemetery and has a plaque from Zeta Phi Beta to decorate her grave.
