= Ruth Logan Roberts =

American suffragist and YWCA leader (1891–1968)

- Born: 1891
- Died: 1968 (aged 76–77)
- Known for: suffragist, YWCA leader
- Spouse: Eugene Percy Roberts
- Relatives: Charles H. Roberts (brother-in-law)

Ruth Logan Roberts (1891 – 1968) was a suffragist, activist, YWCA leader, and host of a salon in Harlem, New York City.

== Early life ==
Ruth Logan Roberts was born in 1891 as the daughter of suffragist Adella Hunt Logan. Roberts studied physical therapy at Boston's Sargent School of Physical Education, graduating in 1911. Roberts later served a physical educator for the Tuskegee Institute. In 1917, she married the physician Eugene Percy Roberts, and the couple moved to New York City.

== Activism ==
Ruth Logan Roberts began her work as a suffragist around 1913 in Tuskegee. She continued her activism after her move to New York City, notably serving on a number of boards and actively advocating for women's suffrage and against racial discrimination.

Roberts was a member of the boards of directors of national and local YWCA as well as board of the Katy Ferguson Home for Unmarried Mothers. She also served on the New York State Board of Social Welfare.

While at the YWCA, Roberts helped organize women in the sale of war bonds through the Liberty Loan program.

She also served on the New York State Board of Social Welfare, a position that she was appointed to by Governor Thomas E. Dewey. Her health education led her to serve on the boards of New York Tuberculosis and Health Association and the National Association of Colored Graduate Nurses.

== Salon ==
Roberts hosted a regular salon at her home at 130 West 130th Street in Harlem, New York City, that brought together major figures active in Harlem at the time in politics, community service, and the arts.

== See also ==
- African-American woman suffrage movement
