= Edward Ransom Farmstead, Livestock and Equipment Barn =

- U.S. National Register of Historic Places
- Location within Arkansas Location within the United States
- Location: Co. Rd. 359 W of jct. with US 167, Midway, Arkansas
- Coordinates: 35°30′11″N 91°36′46″W
- Area: less than one acre
- Built: 1915
- Architectural style: Triple-log crib barn
- MPS: White County MPS
- NRHP reference No.: 91001361
- Added to NRHP: July 22, 1992

The Edward Ransom Farmstead, Livestock and Equipment Barn was a historic agricultural outbuilding in rural White County, Arkansas. It was located on the Ransom Farmstead, a few miles south of Midway, on the west side of United States Route 167. It was a 1 1/2-story structure, built in part out of logs and in part out of wood framing. Its principal form was derived from three log cribs, joined by saddle- and V-notching, a form not seen anywhere else in the county. It was built about 1915.

The building was listed on the National Register of Historic Places in 1992. It has been listed as destroyed by the Arkansas Historic Preservation Program.

== See also ==
- National Register of Historic Places listings in White County, Arkansas
