= Ransome (surname) =

Ransome is the surname of:

- Arthur Ransome (1884–1967), English author and journalist
- Ernest L. Ransome (1852–1917), Anglo-American architect and concrete engineer
- Frederick Ransome (1818–1893), British inventor of artificial stone
- Frederick Leslie Ransome (1868–1934), English-American geologist
- James Ransome (manufacturer) (1782–1849), British agricultural machinery manufacturer, son of Robert Ransome
- James Ransome (illustrator), American illustrator of children's books
- James Allen Ransome (1806–1875), British agricultural machinery manufacturer and writer, grandson of Robert Ransome
- Prunella Ransome (1943–2002), English actress
- Robert Ransome (1753–1830), British founder of an agricultural machinery maker

== See also ==
- Ransom (surname)
- Ransome-Kuti family, an influential Nigerian family
- Jennifer Ransome, a Marvel Comics character
- Ransone (redirect)
