= Britt Ransom =

American professor

- Born: 1987 (age 38–39); Lima, Ohio
- Education: Ohio State University (2008); University of Illinois Chicago (2011)
- Known for: digital fabrication, installation, sculpture, environmental art
- Website: www.brittanyransom.com

Brittany Ransom (born 1987). is an American artist and associate professor of art at Carnegie Mellon University who is known for her sculpture and installation work that explores environmental issues and is made using digital fabrication processes. Ransom lives and works in Pittsburgh and New Orleans. She is the great-great-granddaughter of civil rights activists Reverdy C. Ransom and Emma S. Ransom.

== Early life ==
Born in Lima, Ohio and attended Lima Central Catholic High School. She earned her BFA in Art and Technology from The Ohio State University (2008) where she studied with Ken Rinaldo and Amy Youngs. Ransom earned her MFA in Electronic Visualization from the University of Illinois at Chicago (2011) where she studied with Sabrina Raaf and Daniel Sauter. Ransom is biracial.

== Career ==
Ransom began her academic career as an assistant professor of Digital Hybrid Media at Southern Methodist University in 2012. After teaching at Southern Methodist University for three years, Ransom took an appointment at California State University Long Beach from 2015 to 2022 where she was an associate professor of Sculpture/4D, Program Head of Sculpture, and associate director for the School of Art. Ransom is currently an associate professor of art in the Sculpture, Installation, and Site Work area at Carnegie Mellon University.

Ransom's work has been exhibited at the Contemporary Art Center New Orleans (2022), Royale Projects (2020), Honor Fraser (2021), Schering Stiftung (2017), Torrance Art Museum (2016), Texas Woman's University (2018), University of Dallas (2015), and the Chicago Artist's Coalition (2012) Her work explores the relationship between humans and various species of insects and plants. She is known for her experimental installation Tweet Roach.

Ransom has been selected for numerous awards, residencies, and fellowships. She has participated in the New Museum's New Inc. program during its tenth year and her work was supported by the Heinz Endowment's Creative Development Award. In 2022 she won the Hopper Prize and the Formlabs User Impact Award. Ransom has been selected for residencies and fellowships including the Joan Mitchell Center Residency, Los Angeles Clean Tech Incubator (LACI) residency, and the Arctic Circle Residency. In 2019, Ransom was selected as a lead artist for the ZERO1 American Arts Incubator, an initiative of the U.S. Department of State's Bureau of Educational and Cultural Affairs. Ransom also won the College Art Association Professional Development Fellowship in 2011.

Ransom previously worked as an organizer with SIGGRAPH where was the chair of the Art Gallery in 2019 and the Studio area in 2017 both in Los Angeles.

In 2020, Ransom was a participant on the Disney+ competition show Shop Class starring Justin Long.

Ransom's writing has been published in the Leonardo Journal published by MIT press, The 3D Additivist Cookbook, The Routledge Companion to Biology in Art and Architecture, and In and Out of View: Art and the Dynamics of Circulation, Suppression, and Censorship.
