= Ransom L. Ford =

American politician

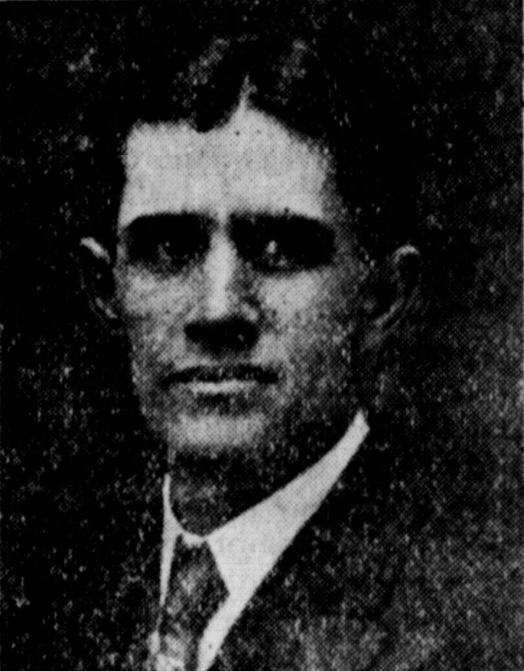

Member of the Michigan House of Representatives from the Genesee County 1st district
- In office January 1, 1915 – January 1, 1919
- Preceded by: Bert F. Crapser
- Succeeded by: Peter B. Lennon

Personal details
- Born: February 12, 1878 Byron, Michigan
- Died: 1973 (aged 94–95)
- Party: Republican

Ransom L. Ford (February 12, 1878 – 1973) was a Michigan politician.

== Early life ==
Ford was born on February 12, 1878, in Byron, Michigan. He was of English parentage. Ford attended Chesaning High School.

== Career ==
Ford was the owner and editor of the newspaper the Montrose Record from around 1900 until December 1, 1914. In 1912, he ran for the Michigan House of Representatives seat representing the Genesee County 1st District but was defeated by Progressive Party candidate Bert F. Crapser. In the November 3, 1914, election, he defeated Crapser in his attempt at re-election. Ford represented this district in the state house from January 1, 1915, until January 1, 1919.

== Personal life ==
Ford was a member of the Montrose Lodge, and held the position of master and patron of different locations. He was a Freemason and a member of the Order of the Eastern Star.

== Death ==
Ford died in 1973.
