= Moe Anderson =

American author/motivational speaker/dental surgeon (born 1962)

Dr. Moe Anderson
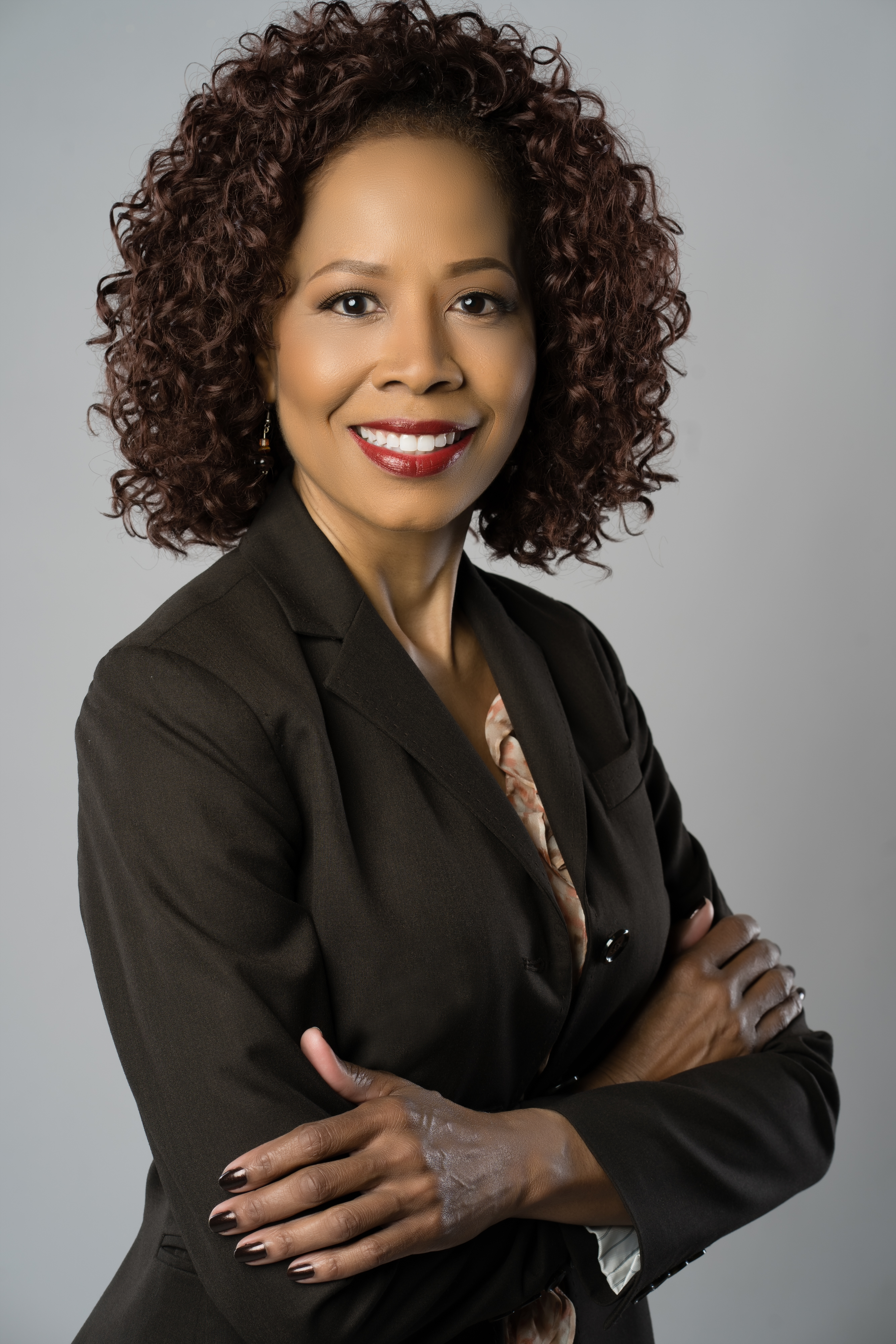
- Born: October 16, 1962 (age 63); Houston, Texas, U.S.
- Other name: Dr. Moe
- Education: Baylor University (BA); University of Minnesota School of Dentistry
- Occupations: Writer, Dentist, Speaker
- Website: drmoeanderson.com

Monica "Dr. Moe" Frazier Anderson (born October 16, 1962) is an American author, journalist, motivational speaker, and Doctor of Dental Surgery.

== Early years ==
Anderson was born in Houston, Texas. Her family moved to Fort Worth, Texas when she was three-years-old. Upon graduation from O.D. Wyatt High School, she attended Baylor University, earning a Bachelor of Arts degree in biology in 1984. A classmate at Baylor gave her the nickname "Moe" because he could not remember her preferred pronunciation of mo-nee-ka.

While at Baylor, she followed in the legacy of her paternal grandmother and mother by becoming a member of Zeta Phi Beta sorority. She then entered dental school graduating from the University of Minnesota School of Dentistry in 1988 with a doctorate in dental surgery. Friends began calling her "Dr. Moe."

== Career ==
Anderson became an associate at a dental practice in Minnetonka, Minnesota, in 1988. The following year she was hired to write a column for a sports magazine, the Minnesota Vikings Update.

Anderson's first book, Black English Vernacular: From Ain’t to Yo Mama, a dictionary of African American Vernacular English, was published by Rainbow Books in 1994. She was a weekly columnist for the Star-Telegram, a major daily newspaper in Texas from 1996 to 2004. Her second book, Mom, Are We There Yet?, is a collection of several of those columns. Her exposure as a journalist led to an opportunity to host a cable television program, Perpetual Moe-tion, for AT&T. and launched her professional speaking career.

Anderson formed a publishing company, TyMAC Books, and published When A Sistah’s FED UP in 2005 which became an Essence Magazine and Dallas Morning News bestseller. Her next novel, I Stand Accused, made the Dallas Morning News bestseller list shortly after publication in 2007. Her third novel and fifth book, Sinphony, was published in 2011. Success Is A Side Effect is a self-help book that Dr. Anderson released in 2014. "Never Close Your Heart," Anderson's fourth novel and seventh book was released in 2020.

Anderson is a frequent keynote speaker at national conventions and corporate meetings.

She hosts a podcast that is available for streaming on all major platforms Perpetual mOetion with Dr. mOe Anderson. The episodes focus on family, current events, health and wellness, and self-improvement.

== Honors and awards ==
Anderson has been honored by civic groups, government agencies and educational institutions for her community leadership. She was presented the "Distinguished Alumni" award by the Fort Worth Independent School District in 1995. In 1999, the staff of the Fort Worth Weekly named her "The Best Columnist in Tarrant County." She also received the Millennium Award for "Outstanding Contribution to Healthcare" from Altrusa International, Inc in 2001. That same year, she was presented the "Outstanding Young Alumni Award" by Baylor University.

Anderson was selected to participate in the American Dental Association's Diversity in Leadership Program. After spending a year studying business administration with leading business school professors, graduates are encouraged to return to their communities and start a community service initiative. Dr. Anderson launched Drop the Drugs an educational nonprofit to combat drug abuse and misuse, particularly around opioids. Drop the Drugs worked with local law enforcement and student volunteers to raise awareness at various about safe drug storage and disposal at community events across the United States. The organization has been recognized by the City of Grand Prairie, TX which proclaimed May 7, 2019 "Drop the Drugs Day". She has a history of volunteerism in her home state. While she lived full time in Austin, Texas, the Texas House of Representatives presented Anderson with the 2011 Congressional Black Caucus Outstanding Community Volunteer award at the legislators' annual conference. She currently continues to write, speak, and work as a certified Dental Consultant. She divides her time between Austin, Texas, and DFW.
