= Dawnette Lounds-Culp =

- Born: January 15, 1968 (age 58); Kingston, Jamaica
- Presenting career
- Show: Your Family Issues
- Country: USA

Dawnette Lounds-Culp is an entrepreneur, author, talk radio show host, coach & consultant and an advocate. Lounds-Culp came to United States in August 1973 to Atlanta, Georgia where she grew up. Lounds-Culp first authored The Face of Child Support, a nonfiction guide and workbook for both custodial and non-custodial parents. The Face of Child Support was published in 2005 and is available at local book stores. Lounds-Culp's radio talk show, Your Family Issues focuses on strengthening families by bringing to the forefront daily topics that affects mothers and fathers, wives and husbands, women and men. Your Family Issues is aired on [1490 WERE AM], Cleveland, Ohio every Monday through Friday from 5:00 AM to 6:00 AM.

== Consulting ==
Lounds-Culp is very active in consulting mothers and fathers who are faced with child support issues. Lounds-Culp always focuses on the children needs and brings the parents to focus on the same. Lounds-Culp created PRO-Youth, Inc., a not-for-profit organization in 1998 to work with middle and high school students. PRO-Youth administers programs to teach etiquette, self-esteem and confidence in teenagers. Through PRO-Youth, Inc., Lounds-Culp consults teenagers that are faced with problems.

== Publishing ==
In 2003 when the idea to write a book to assist parents, both custodial and non-custodial parents going through the child support process, Lounds-Culp established her own publishing company, Angel Eyes Publishing Co., Inc. and self-published her first nonfiction book, The Face of Child Support. The Face of Child Support was mentioned in Essence May 2005 Collector's Edition as a must read book in the Mother's Survival Guide section of the magazine.

== Radio talk show ==
Since publishing The Face of Child Support, Lounds-Culp has been a guest on many radio stations across the country. After realizing the positive impact of talking to callers regarding their child support issues, in June 2007, Lounds-Culp aired her first radio talk show, Your Family Issues on 1490 WERE AM in Cleveland, Ohio. Her first topic was about the rise and fall of the traditional family. This upbeat radio talk show highlights the importance of the family dynamics, from happy marriages, amicable divorces, responsible parenting and the importance of financial stability. Lounds-Culp audience consist of mostly 18 to 48 age range and African American, but has a strong audience of 48 and above in age. Family issues affect children, parents, husbands, wives, grandparents and other family members. On a given day, you can hear topics about child support, domestic violence, the growing trend of cohabitation, the war on military marriages and much more.

== Radio stations ==
As a guest on radio stations across the country, Dawnette Lounds-Culp has reached audiences in the following markets:

- WNWS, 101.5 FM Jackson, TN “Carter & Company”
- TD Radio-Internet, Wilkes-Barre, PA
- KEYF 101.1 FM, Spokane, WA
- WHAT AM, Philadelphia, PA
- Issue Today Radio, San Pedro, CA (Southern California)
- KGAB Radio, Cheyenne, WY coverage area is southern and central Wyoming, western Nebraska, and northern Colorado, including the metro Denver area.
- Global Hue, Detroit, MI
- KKNW Donna Seebo show, Tacoma , WA
- Sunbelt Radio, WUNN, Fort Lauderdale, FL
- WACR FM, MS & AL
- WJMH 102 Jams, Greensboro, NC
- WWDM 101.2 FM, Columbus, SCz
- KCOL 600 AM, Denver, CO
- KSOO, Sioux Fall, SD
- Magic 98.9 FM, Greensville, SC
- 107.9 FM "The Matt & Ramone Show", Charlotte, NC
- Star 980 AM "The Wave" Rhonda Bellamy Show, Wilmington, NC
- WENY FM
- WGUN 1010 AM, "Atlanta Issues" with Karen Lovejoy, Atlanta, GA
- WSB Radio (An ABC Affiliate) "Issues in the Black" with Twanda Black, Atlanta, GA
- WERE 1300 AM, The Ronnie Duncan Morning Show, Cleveland, OH
- 102.5 Michael Eric Dyson Show (Morning Drive 10 AM – 1 PM), Atlanta, GA
- 102.5 Warren Balentine Show (Morning Drive 10 AM – 1 PM), Atlanta, GA

== Personal life ==
Lounds-Culp was born in Kingston, Jamaica on January 15, 1968, one of six children. Her father George was an automobile mechanic and mother Cynthia, a seamstress. Her family moved to the United States in August 1973. She grew up in metropolitan Atlanta, Georgia. She was homecoming queen in 1986 at Woodland High School in East Point, Georgia. After graduating from high school, Lounds-Culp attended Spelman College and later transferred to Georgia State University. She became a member of Zeta Phi Beta sorority in spring 1987.

Lounds-Culp has two children, Austin Thomas Lounds from a previous relationship in which inspired her to write The Face of Child Support and her second son, Loren Charles Culp from her marriage to Steven Charles Culp. Lounds-Culp was married from April 2003 to November 2005.

Even though her name is hyphenated, Lounds-Culp elected to keep her name because of her son of the marriage that has the last name Culp and her first son with the last name Lounds.
