= Ransom Township =

Ransom Township may refer to:

- Ransom Township, Michigan
- Ransom Township, Nobles County, Minnesota
- Ransom Township, Columbus County, North Carolina, in Columbus County, North Carolina
- Ransom Township, Sargent County, North Dakota, in Sargent County, North Dakota
- Ransom Township, Pennsylvania
