= Ransome G. Holdridge =

American painter

Ransome Gillet Holdredge
- Born: 1836; San Francisco, California
- Died: 15 April 1899 (aged 62–63); Alameda, California
- Known for: Painting
- Notable work: Napa Valley, Yosemite, Klamath Indians (1878), Indians Fishing the Klamath (c. 1875), Figures near a Stream on a Stormy Afternoon, Mount Hood, Oregon, Indian encampment in the Sierras
- Movement: San Francisco School; Hudson River School; Barbizon school; Romantic realism

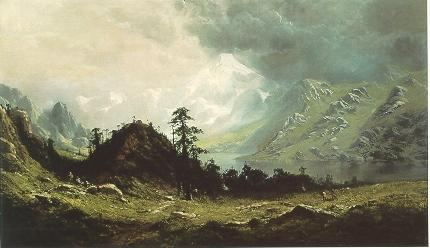
Indian Camp in the Cascades

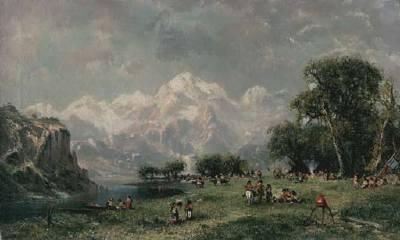
Sioux Encampment in the Rocky Mountains

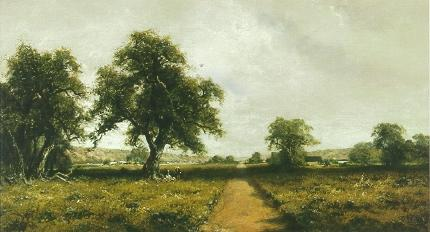
Idle Afternoon. After 1874

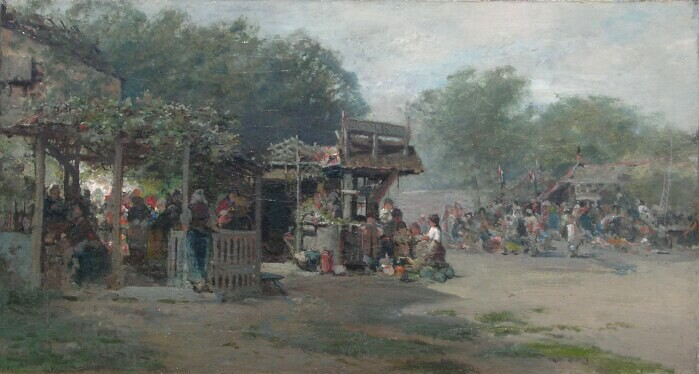
The Wine Festival. 1876

Ransome Gillet Holdredge (1836 - 1899) was an early San Francisco school painter, specializing in Northern California landscapes.

== Biography ==
Holdredge was born in 1836, and moved to the San Francisco Bay Area in the late 1850s, where he became head draughtsman at Mare Island Naval Yard. In 1874, with the assistance of friends and patrons, he moved to Paris for two years where he studied painting and traveled around Europe. On his return, he gained a reputation as a leading landscape artist, traveling through the Western United States from Utah and the Rocky Mountains, to Oregon and the Sierra Mountains, to Yosemite and to the San Francisco Bay Area, often living with local Native American tribes.

He may have been a founder of the Bohemian Club of San Francisco, and was an early member of that association. He helped organize the San Francisco Art Association and was friends with Charles Warren Stoddard and Robert Louis Stevenson. After achieving fame, he attained some wealth, which he subsequently squandered on drink. He died destitute, on or around April 15, 1899.

There are claims that Holdredge served as a field artist for Scribner's or was present at Major Reno's actions at Custer's Last Stand, but these claims are disputed.

== Career ==
Holdredge was recognized as a great painter during his life. His paintings are in the permanent collections of many museums, particularly those specializing in California artists. His works are (or have been) displayed in the Shumate Collection of the Oakland Museum of California, the De Young Museum, the Hart Collection at the Sonoma County Museum, the Utah Museum of Fine Arts, Sacramento's Crocker Museum, Society of California Pioneers, Bohemian Club, University of California Berkeley's Bancroft Library, Prescott, Arizona's Phippen Museum of Western Art, The Colorado Heritage Center at the Colorado Historical Society in Denver, Colorado, Reno's Sierra Nevada Museum, Chrysler Museum of Art in Norfolk, Virginia, Hearst Art Gallery at Saint Mary's College of California, Jack S Blanton Museum of Art, Oregon Historical Society in Portland, Oregon, and Rockwell Museum in Corning, NY.

Prior to his studies in Europe, Holdredge painted in the Hudson River School style of realism, and signed his works with the surname spelled Holdridge. In Europe, he developed a romantic style evocative of the Barbizon School, and began spelling his surname as Holdredge.
