= Anna Arnold Hedgeman =

American civil rights leader, politician, educator, and writer (1899-1990)

Anna Hedgeman
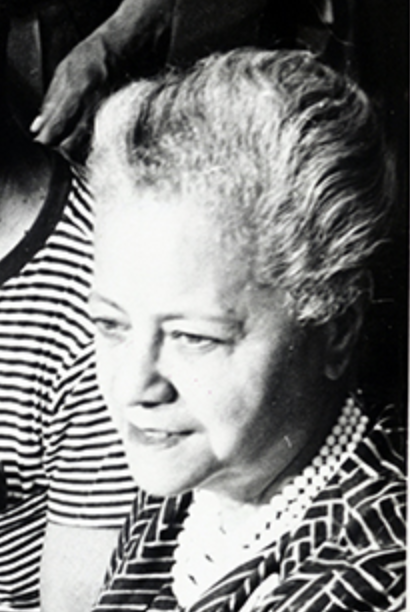

Personal details
- Born: Anna Arnold; July 5, 1899 Marshall, Iowa, U.S.
- Died: January 17, 1990 (aged 90) New York City, U.S.
- Party: Democratic
- Education: Hamline University (BA)

Anna Arnold Hedgeman (July 5, 1899 – January 17, 1990) was an African-American civil rights leader, politician, educator, and writer. Under President Harry Truman, Hedgeman served as executive director of the National Council for a Permanent Fair Employment Practices Commission, having worked on his presidential campaign. She was also appointed to New York City mayor Robert Wagner's cabinet, becoming the first African-American woman to hold a cabinet post in New York. Hedgeman was a major advocate for both minorities and the poor in New York City. She also served as a consultant for many companies and entities on racial issues, and late in life founded Hedgeman Consultant Services. She was among the organizers of the 1963 March on Washington. During her years in the civil rights movement, she befriended Dorothy Height.

== Early life and family ==
Anna Arnold was born in Marshalltown, Iowa, to William James Arnold II and Marie Ellen (Parker) Arnold. She moved with her family to Anoka, Minnesota, where her family was the only African-American one in the small town. However, her family was an active part of the community and she was never made to feel different while growing up. The Methodist Church and school were both vital parts of the Arnold family's life. Her father created an encouraging environment that stressed education and a strong work ethic. Hedgeman learned how to read at home but was not permitted to attend school until she was seven years old.

In 1918, Hedgeman graduated from Anoka High School and continued her education at Hamline University, a Methodist College in Saint Paul, Minnesota. She was the college's first African-American student. In 1922, Hedgeman became the first African-American graduate, having earned a B.A. degree in English. While in college, she heard W. E. B. Du Bois speak, which inspired her to succeed as an educator.

In 1936, she married Merritt Hedgeman, a musician with a particular interest in African-American folk music and opera, in New York City. The couple had no children.

== Pre-political career ==
For two years, Hedgeman taught English and History at Rust College, a historically Black college in Holly Springs, Mississippi, where she had her first experience with segregation.

Hedgeman began work in the community in the 1920s when she became executive director of a Black branch of the YWCA in Jersey City, New Jersey. She worked for the YWCA as an executive director in Ohio, New Jersey, Harlem, Philadelphia, and Brooklyn. All of these branches were segregated.

Hedgeman also served as the executive director of the National Committee for a Permanent Fair Employment Practices Commission, Assistant Dean of Women at Howard University, associate editor for the New York Age, a consultant for the public relations department of Fuller Products Company, and on Harry Truman's 1948 presidential campaign.

== Civil rights activism ==
Throughout the 1930s, Hedgeman remained active in protest activities, her militancy resulting in a forced resignation from the directorship of the Black branch of the Brooklyn YWCA. In 1944, she became the executive secretary of the National Council for a Permanent Fair Employment Practice Committee (FEPC). In 1946, Hedgeman served as assistant dean of women at Howard University.

In 1954, she became the first African-American woman to hold a mayoral cabinet position in the history of New York City. In 1958, she held a position as a public relations consultant in Fuller Products Company. She became an associate editor and columnist for New York Age in 1959. In later years, she founded Hedgeman Consultant Services in New York City, with her husband.

In 1963, Hedgeman was an organizer of the March on Washington for Jobs and Freedom. She worked alongside activists such as Bayard Rustin and A. Philip Randolph. This movement brought over 250,000 activists to Washington, D.C. Hedgeman individually recruited 40,000 Protestants to participate.

In 1966 she became a co-founder of the National Organization for Women.

Hedgeman served as teacher, lecturer, and consultant to numerous educational centers, boards, and colleges and universities, particularly in the area of African-American studies. She traveled to Africa and lectured throughout the United States, especially in Black schools and colleges, as an example of a Black hero. She stressed to students the importance of understanding history as a basis to achieve equality. In the 1970s, she frequently spoke at colleges in both Africa and the United States of America.

Hedgeman held memberships in numerous organizations, such as the Child Study Association, Community Council of the City of New York, National Urban League, NAACP, United Nations Association, Advisory Committee on Alcoholism, Advisory Committee on Drug Addiction, and the National Conference of Christians and Jews.

In 1963, she began serving as Coordinator of Special Events for the Commission of Religion and Race of the National Council of Churches. She used this role to communicate to white Christians about why racism went against their religion. This was also the mode through which she recruited 40,000 Protestants to participate in the March on Washington for Jobs and Freedom. She retired from the NCC in 1967.

Hedgeman was the author of The Trumpet Sounds (1964), The Gift of Chaos (1977), and articles in numerous organizational publications, newspapers, and journals.

== Political career ==
Hedgeman became a consultant on racial problems for New York City's Department of Welfare during the Great Depression, during which time it was called the Emergency Relief Bureau. In this role she investigated major racial issues, including the continuation of underground slavery through the Bronx Slave Markets, as well as studying the living conditions of minorities and encouraging civil service appointments for these under-represented citizens.

In 1954, Hedgeman became the first woman to serve on the cabinet of a New York City mayor, serving for one term under Robert F. Wagner, Jr. Following an acclaimed swearing in at city hall, it appeared that the mayor had no intention of employing Hedgeman to any position. She responded by assembling allies throughout the African-American press, in order to put Wagner's potential reneging under the public eye. This was a great success, and Hedgeman received her spot on the cabinet, although she was put in a basement office. In this role, she served as an intermediary between Harlem and city hall. She also attended events for the mayor as his stand in when he could not make an appearance.

In 1960, Hedgeman planned to run for United States Congress. She also had an unsuccessful race for City Council President in New York City.

== Honors and awards ==
Hedgeman was a recipient of the Pioneer Woman Award, awarded by the New York State Conference on Midlife and Older Woman in 1983.

Hedgeman received an Extraordinary Woman of Achievement Award from the National Conference of Christians and Jews.

She was also granted honorary doctor degrees by Howard University and Hamline University.

Hedgeman's portrait hangs in the National Portrait Gallery in Washington, D.C.

== Death ==
After her husband died in 1987, Hedgeman moved to the Greater Harlem Nursing Home in Harlem. She died on January 17, 1990, in Harlem Hospital at the age of 90.

== Works ==
- The Trumpet Sounds: A Memoir of Negro Leadership (1964). New York: Holt, Rinehart and Winston.
- The Gift of Chaos: Decades of American Discontent (1977). Oxford University Press. ISBN 0195021967, 978-0195021967
