= Lulu Vere Childers =

American music educator

- Born: February 28, 1870; Dry Ridge, Kentucky, U.S.
- Died: March 6, 1946 (aged 76); Howell, Michigan, U.S.
- Education: Oberlin Conservatory of Music
- Occupation: Educator

Lulu Vere Childers (February 28, 1870 – March 6, 1946) was an African-American music educator.

Born in Dry Ridge, Kentucky, she graduated from the Oberlin Conservatory in 1896, and in 1905 joined the faculty of Howard University in Washington, D.C., where she is accredited with initiating the Conservatory of Music in 1913 and School of Music in 1918. Childers ran the Howard University Choral Society; over the years they performed works such as Handel's Messiah in 1919. She was musical director of the university from 1905 until 1942. She was a friend of singer Marian Anderson.

She died in 1946 in Howell, Michigan. Lulu Vere Childers Hall, named in her honor, is located in the Division of Fine Arts building at Howard University.
