= Reverdy C. Ransom =

American Christian socialist and civil rights activist

Bishop Reverdy Cassius Ransom
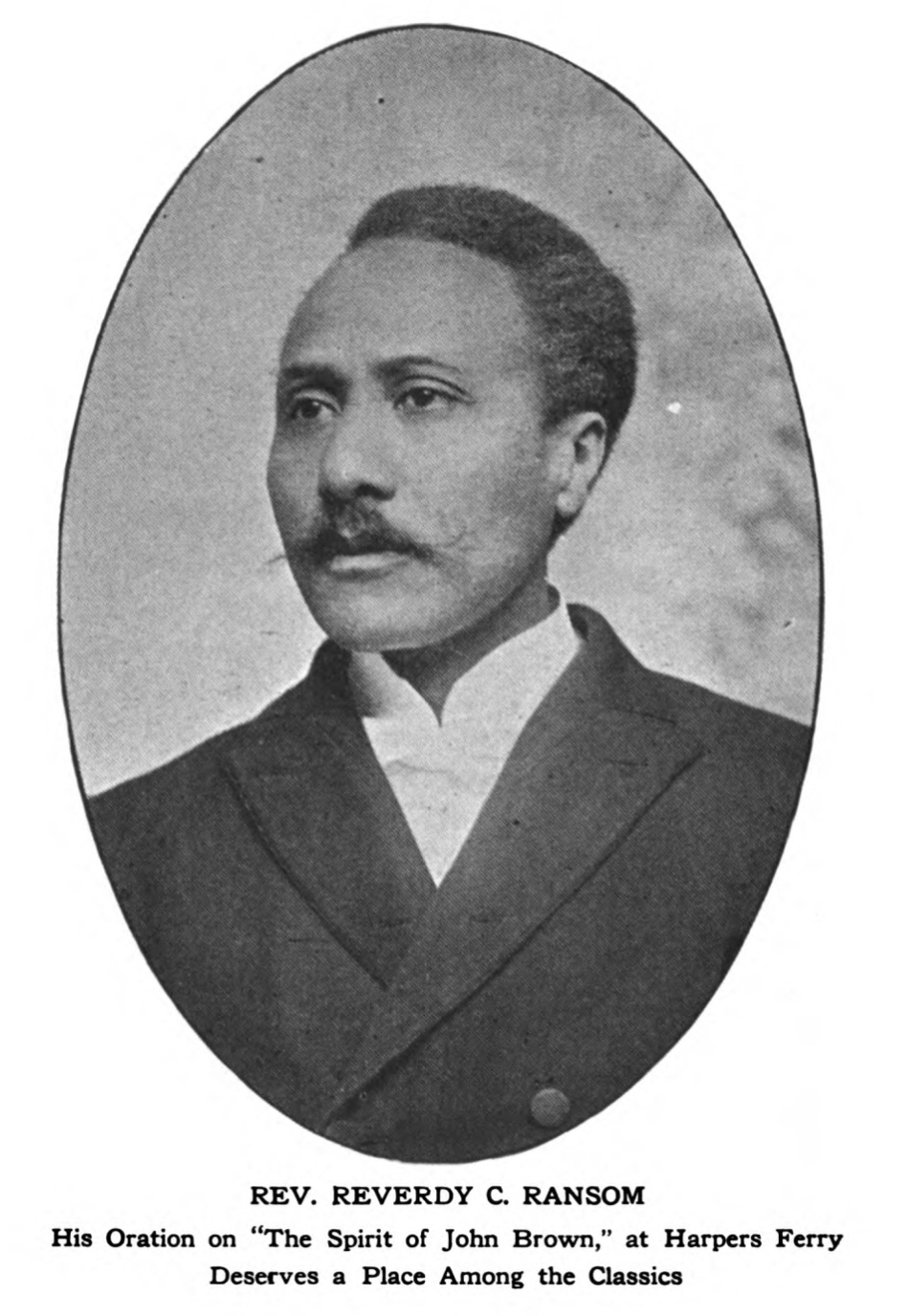
- Born: January 4, 1861; Flushing, Ohio, U.S.
- Died: April 22, 1959 (aged 98); Wilberforce, Ohio, U.S.
- Spouse(s): Leanna Watkins (1881–1886); Emma S. Connor (1887–1943); Georgia Myrtle Teal (1943–1959)

Reverdy Cassius Ransom (January 4, 1861 – April 22, 1959) was an American Christian socialist, civil rights activist, and leader in the African Methodist Episcopal Church. He was ordained and served as the 48th A.M.E. bishop.

== Biography ==
=== Early years ===
Reverdy Cassius Ransom was born in Flushing, Ohio, on January 4, 1861. His father, whose name is not recorded, was a Native American, and his mother, Harriet Johnson, was an African American who sacrificed herself in order to ensure Reverdy's education.

Ransom was introduced to the African Methodist Episcopal church (A.M.E.) in 1865, by his mother and stepfather, in Washington, Ohio. Although he was not used to the idea of attending church he was forced due to his stepfather's family influence, he was intrigued by the church's fight for civil rights and economic stability for the African-American community. He was also intrigued by the militant leaders who were head of the church, such as Daniel Payne, Benjamin W. Arnett, and Henry McNeal Turner. While Ransom had not fully committed to the church as a young boy, the A.M.E. Churches' discussion of racial issues helped strengthen his religious consciousness.

In his youth, Ransom married and had a child. His mother raised this child, his first son, while Ransom's wife worked, because his mother was dedicated to Ransom's education and future. Ransom began his higher education at Wilberforce University. Although he attended Oberlin College for some small portion of his higher education, he returned to Wilberforce University very soon with renewed appreciation for its many positive qualities.

While studying and preparing for ordained ministry at Wilberforce, Ransom became distanced from his first wife due to a growing intellectual chasm. They eventually divorced, and he remarried. The Emma Ransom House YWCA in Harlem, New York City, was named in honor of his second wife Emma S. Ransom. She helped many young black women to better their education and lives.

=== Career ===
Bishop Reverdy C. Ransom served the A.M.E. Church as a minister in the late 1880s. During this time, he witnessed the harsh despair and poverty that African Americans suffered in the industrial centers in Altoona and Alleghany, Pennsylvania. After examining the role of church in the community, he decided that the best way to fight the poor living conditions of African Americans was to establish programs that taught self-improvement.

Reverdy C. Ransom was a co-founder and featured speaker at the second meeting of the Niagara Movement, forerunner of the NAACP, in 1906 at Storer College in Harpers Ferry, West Virginia. Ransom spoke passionately on "The Spirit of John Brown."

Ransom ran for Congress in a 1918 special election as an independent, supported by the nomination of the United Civic League; he was struck from the ballot due to petition irregularities.

=== Ideas ===
Bishop Reverdy C. Ransom recognized the inequality in American society, blaming it on capitalism and individualism and seeing socialism and Christian faith as means to tackle this evil. He believed that the world had enough resources to care for all humanity, but the distribution of them was wrongly handled. For him, socialism offered a means to help the downtrodden, which was in keeping with the teachings of Jesus Christ.

Ransom disagreed with the idea that the African race was inferior to the White, and explained the hardships suffered by his people in the United States as a burden, during which God strengthened them in order that they would be a better instrument afterward to help bring the African race to a rightful position in American society. This can be seen as his answer to the theological question of the problem of evil.

God brought naked barbarians from Africa, put them upon the anvil of American Christianity and Democracy; under the white heat of denial and persecution, He is fashioning them with sledgehammer blows into a new pattern from American civilization.

— Reverdy C. Ransom, The Negro, The hope or the despair of Christianity

=== Death and legacy ===
Ransom was an eloquent orator. He served as Pastor of Charles Street A. M. E. in Boston, Massachusetts, as well as many other churches in New York, Ohio, and Bethel Church in Chicago. He founded the Institutional Church and Social Settlement. Ransom provided social programs for youth, including early education, job training, counseling, childcare and lectures.

Reverdy C. Ransom was the first African American to give an address at Faneuil Hall in Boston, Massachusetts. While he was still the Pastor of Charles Street A. M. E. Church, he gave his soul-stirring oration at Faneuil Hall on December 11, 1905, titled: "The William Lloyd Garrison Oration." His powerful address was given for "The William Lloyd Garrison Centennial Citizen's Celebration", an event was held by the Boston Suffrage League to celebrate the 100th Anniversary of the birth of William Lloyd Garrison.

Bishop Ransom also served as a historian and editor of the A.M.E. Church Review.

Bishop Reverdy C. Ransom died April 22, 1959.

"The Bishop Reverdy Cassius Ransom Memorial Library" is located on the campus of Wilberforce University, Ohio, at Payne Theological Seminary in honor of his religious, civil rights and humanitarian accomplishments. The library was dedicated on Friday, May 8, 2009.

Ransom's great-great granddaughter is Britt Ransom, Associate Professor of Art at Carnegie Mellon University.

== See also ==
- W. E. B. Du Bois

== Works ==
- "Ingersoll the Humanitarian," A-M.E. Church Review, vol. 38 (April 1922), pp. 173–175.
- The Pilgrimage of Harriet Ransom's Son. Nashville, TN: Sunday School Union, n.d. [1949].
- Making the Gospel Plain: The Writings of Bishop Reverdy C. Ransom. Anthony Pinn, editor. Harrisburg, PA: Trinity Press International, 1999.
