= First Baptist Church, Lauderdale =

Historic church in Tennessee, United States

- First Colored Baptist Church
- U.S. National Register of Historic Places
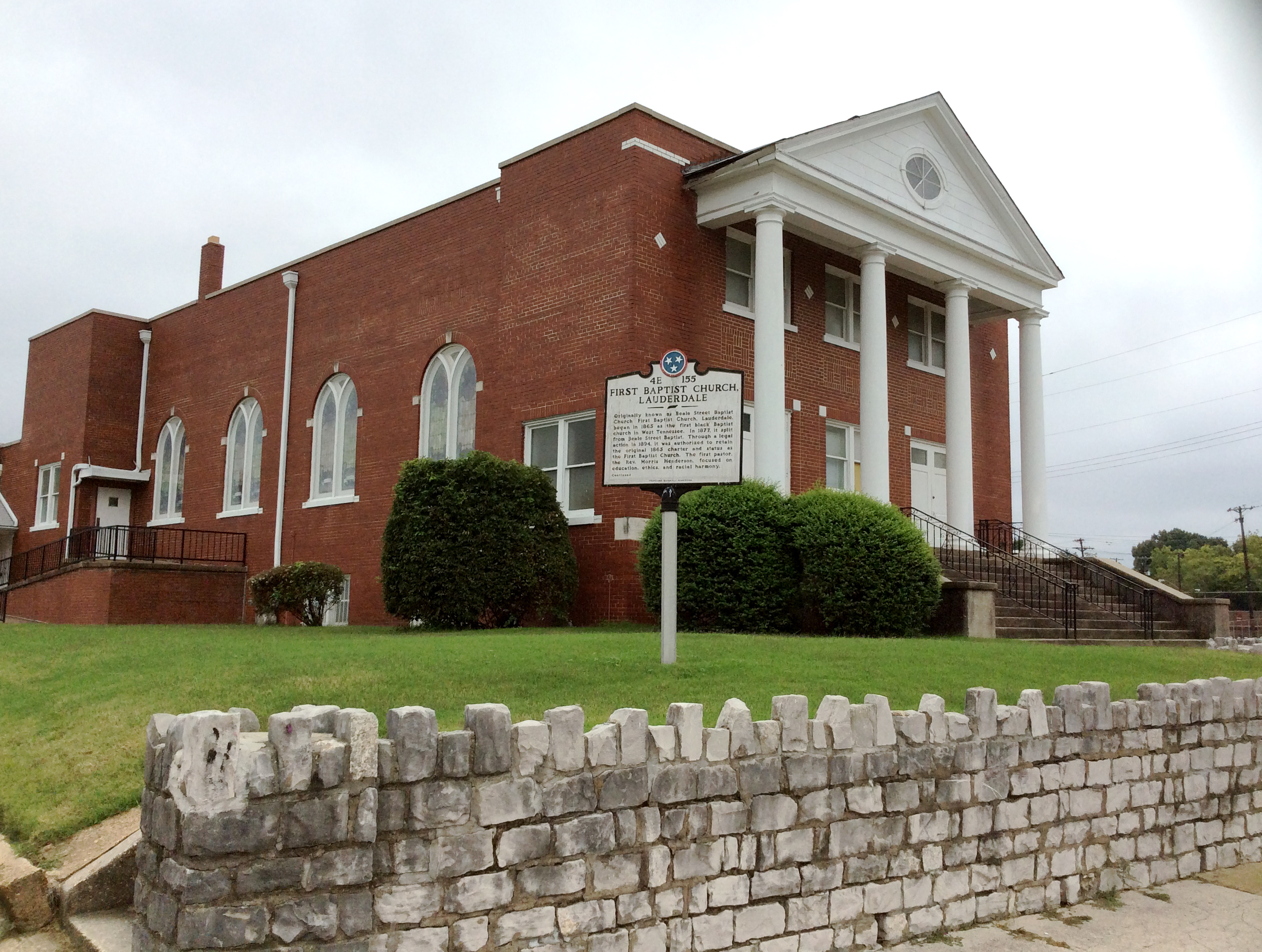

- Location within Tennessee Location within the United States
- Location: 682 S. Lauderdale St., Memphis, Tennessee
- Coordinates: 35°7′43″N 90°2′37″W
- Area: 1 acre (0.40 ha)
- Built: 1939
- Built by: Scott, Samuel F.; Davis, Edgar H.
- Architect: Thomas O. Fuller
- Architectural style: vernacular Colonial Revival
- NRHP reference No.: 00000807
- Added to NRHP: July 14, 2000

The First Colored Baptist Church in Memphis, Tennessee, also known as First Baptist Church—Lauderdale, was built in 1939 in a vernacular Colonial Revival style, with design attributed to Rev. Thomas O. Fuller.

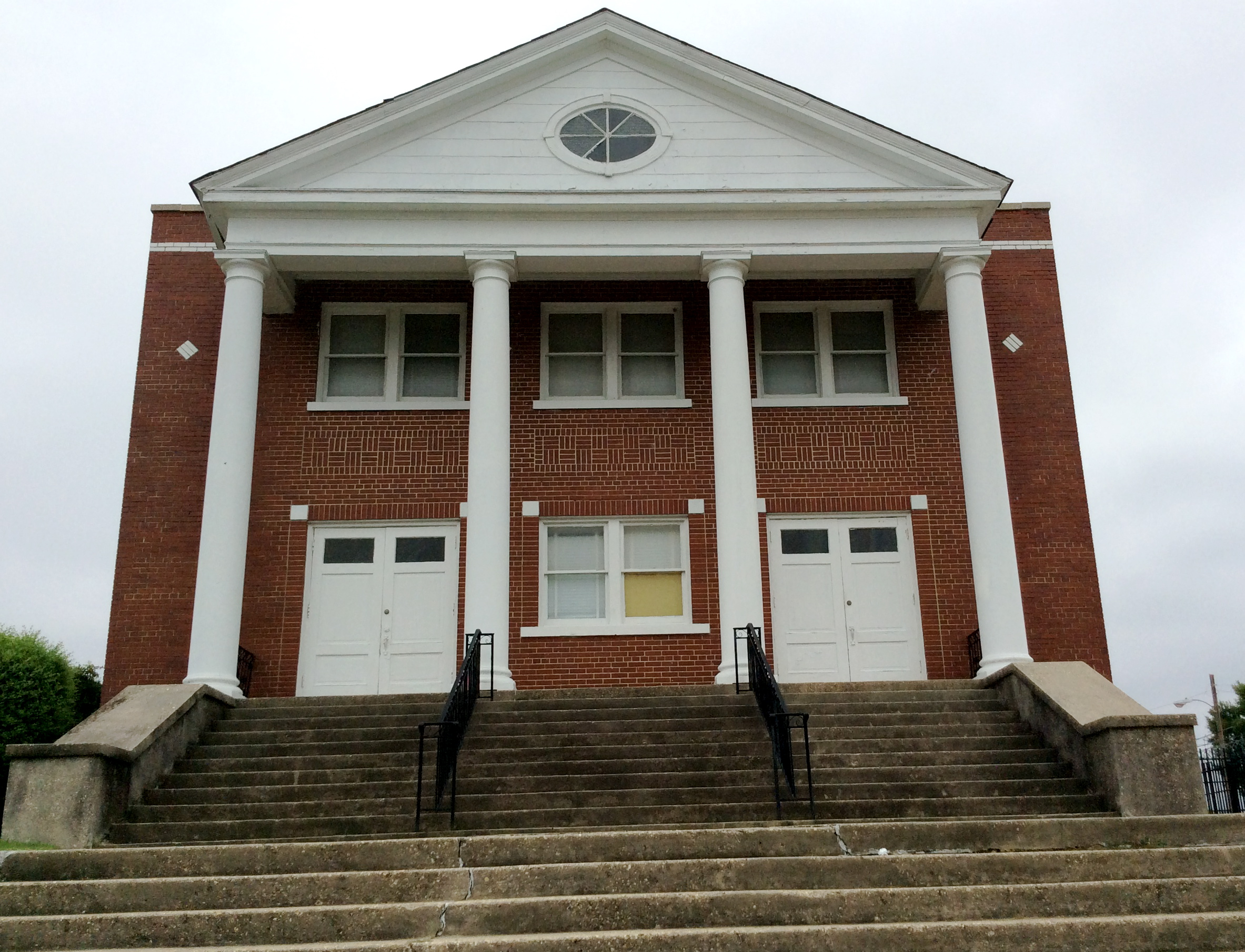
Front of the church

== History ==
The First Baptist Church, Lauderdale is a rectangular brick building with brick laid in common bond. It has a limestone fence separating its parking area from the street, which is a c.1890 fence from the former Second Empire-styled Sanford house on the property.

It was listed on the National Register of Historic Places in 2000. It was deemed significant for its association with Thomas Oscar Fuller (1867-).

First Baptist Church, Lauderdale, in Memphis, Shelby County, Tennessee is one of the city's most significant African American churches and is associated with the early twentieth century African-American religious, education, and political leader, the Reverend Thomas Oscar Fuller.

Although the present church building was not constructed until 1939, the significance of the congregation to African-American religious and social history in Memphis dates prior to the American Civil War. The formation of African-American churches during and after the Civil War represented a new era in institution building for the newly emancipated blacks. Religion, which provided a source of strength for African Americans during their enslavement, proved a logical arena for most of the urban African-American institutional development after the war. The fact that a majority of organizational accounts kept with the Freedmen's Saving and Trust Company immediately after the war were either African American churches or benevolent societies associated with the churches, is just one demonstration of the significance of the newly established black religious institutions in post Civil War Memphis.

The congregation of the First Baptist Church, Lauderdale, is considered the “Mother Church” for most of the black Baptist congregations in Memphis, and by extension, for most of the African- American Baptist churches in West Tennessee. The earliest beginnings of the First Baptist Church trace back to 1854, when Morris Henderson, then a slave, ministered to a small group of Christians. Supervised by white ministers, this first group of believers worshiped in the basement of the white First Baptist Church on the corner of Beale and Main Street. A decade later, circa 1864–1865, Morris Henderson received his formal ordination from Baptist missionaries who had flooded into many southern cities to minister to the needs of newly emancipated African Americans.

The end of the Civil War in the spring of 1865 prompted Reverend Henderson to make a down payment on a lot located on Beale Street, using funds raised by women members of the newly established congregation. Hundreds of dollars, for example, came from the efforts of the women's Baptist Sewing Society. Reverend Henderson led his congregation from the basement of the white church at Main and Beale streets to worship under a “brush arbor” at the new site, which was approximately four blocks west on Beale Street. Henderson and leading members chartered the new church as the First Colored Baptist Church. This action made Henderson one of the first African Americans in Memphis to reject white religious paternalism and successfully pioneer a completely black institution. It also established a tradition of leadership and activism on the part of the ministers of the congregation. The role of women members in funding the new church also established a tradition of service for various women clubs and societies within the congregation.

The movement of blacks away from white establishment became common across the South during the early years of Reconstruction. Operating churches independent of white control is one way that post emancipation blacks exercised freedom. Because most of the African American churches of the time were exclusively religious in their business, the white leadership did not perceive the large church assemblage of blacks as a threat. Reverend Henderson mirrored this philosophy by prohibiting the association of overt political groups with the church, although many prominent members of the church were also prominent leaders of various civic, political, and social societies in Victorian-era Memphis.

After an extensive membership drive and fundraising campaign, the First Colored Baptist Church congregation raised $5,000 to completely purchase the Beale Street lot in 1866. Three years later, Henderson raised enough money to build the first level of what would eventually become a large, brick Gothic-styled church building. This church building, the Beale Street Baptist Church, is the oldest brick African-American church building in Tennessee and is listed in the National Register of Historic Places. This large building reflected the growth of church membership. At this time, it was common for 2,500 worshippers to crowd into the building. Reverend Henderson encouraged members to limit their attendance to one service each Sunday.

The heady days of unity, common purpose, and institution building gave way to congregational disputes within a decade of the founding of First Colored Baptist Church. Due to the large membership, doctrinal disagreement, and the death of Reverend Henderson in 1877, the First Baptist Church congregation split into two groups in 1877, both of whom held services on Beale Street. By 1894, the two factions had gone to court to settle the differences. The original church charter by Henderson and the name “First Colored Baptist Church” was given to the group that moved out of the Beale Street church building to worship at Zion Hall at 217 Beale Street.13 The group that remained in the Beale Street church building received the charter for the “Beale Street Baptist Church.” The first minister of the First Colored Baptist Church after this legal separation was Dr. W. S. Ellington, a graduate of Fisk University. He served from 1894 to 1900. The congregation remained on Beale Street until 1906, when under the leadership of Rev. Thomas O. Fuller, the congregation relocated to a site on 495 St. Paul Avenue.14 They consecrated a Victorian Gothic-styled church building as their new home in 1907. At that time in Memphis “Jim Crow” segregation was in full force while, at the same time, there was an important movement among leaders of established African-American institutions to accommodate themselves to their white-dominated environs by strengthening and expanding black institutions, businesses, and neighborhoods. In an era of lynching and white mob violence, some religious leaders rejected actions of political incitement and militancy. Instead, they encouraged racial cooperation and sought alternatives to public protest. This strategy is known as “accommodation,” with Booker T. Washington of Alabama viewed as the most important national figurehead of this movement.

In 1900, Thomas Oscar Fuller became the minister of the First Colored Baptist Church. Upon his arrival in Memphis in 1900, according to standard historical accounts by David Tucker, Lester Lamon, Kenneth Goings, and Gerald Smith, the Reverend Thomas Oscar Fuller adopted a strategy of accommodation; in fact he became of the most prominent black minister in the city due to his principles of accommodation with whites. However, when one considers Fuller's actions over a forty-year period, the broad category of accommodation does not always apply. Fuller often strongly expressed his pride in being African-American and refused to accept the prevailing white notion that blacks were racially inferior. While Fuller clearly adapted himself to the racial climate and assumptions of early twentieth century Memphis, he also exercised what may be called selective accommodation in dealing with the needs of his congregation in specific and middle-class African-Americans of Memphis in general over the next forty years.

In their overview of African-American community building in Memphis between 1860 and 1920, historians Kenneth Goings and Gerald Smith identify Fuller as one of the four most important accommodationists in turn-of-the-century Memphis. He came to Memphis with impressive credentials. He had received his A. M. degree from Shaw University, under his white mentor Dr. Thomas Skinner, in 1893; Fuller later received his doctorate in theology in 1906. He had been politically active in his native state of North Carolina. Prior to his appointment at First Baptist, Reverend Fuller had been elected to and had served in the North Carolina State Senate in 1898. As he recalled in his 1910 autobiography of his North Carolina career, the election was fraught with racial prejudice; the call for white superiority incited riots that resulted in the arson of a local black newspaper and death of innocent African Americans in Wilmington, North Carolina. Once in office, many black North Carolinians looked to Senator Fuller to push an agenda of racial equality since he was the only African American in the state senate. Fuller's philosophy of accommodation impeded him from making demands and instead he emphasized cooperation and harmony between the races in hopes that whites would leave law-abiding African Americans alone. Fuller's approach, however, gained little support from prominent blacks, who wanted more activism for change, nor did it please whites who wanted to eliminate all African Americans from political office, no matter how conservative their politics might be. The criticism and pressure facing Fuller made the pastoral position at the First Baptist Church in Memphis very appealing. He took the job and moved to Memphis.

Fuller fared well in his new home. In 1902, he was named principal of Howe Institute, which had been established in 1888 as the Memphis Baptist and Normal Institute for West Tennessee Baptists. Heading the Institute provided Fuller with important contacts and outlets for his talents. As historian David Tucker has pointed out, “the Institute founders had shrewdly designed a curriculum which combined academic, religious, and industrial training, and therefore had a wide appeal.” Howe's success hinged on “cooperation between the local white power elite and black ministers” and brought the “ministers important white contacts and greater prestige in the community.” Howe provided Fuller with his first podium to attract the attention of white leaders. Originally appointed as the interim principal, until the Institute could find someone to fill the position full time, Rev. Fuller's “temporary” arrangement lasted twenty-seven years until Fuller requested a leave of absence to author two books, after which he continued his educational service to Memphis.

With his prominent positions in education and religion came increased social and political responsibility for Reverend Fuller. In 1905, Fuller was a conservative voice in the dispute and strike over the segregation of the city's streetcars. He urged compliance and highlighted the Christian virtues of abiding the law. When black community members threatened to confront streetcar conductors. Reverend Fuller argued that public confrontations would only produce violence against African Americans. He publicly pleaded for citizens to accept the new laws. He wrote, “the law will be in full effect, and law-abiding citizens can do nothing but respect its provisions.” With his experiences in North Carolina in mind, Fuller viewed attempts to protest the new laws as futile, believing that the white power structure would crush any opposition.

Howe Institute stood on St. Paul Avenue and in 1906–1907, Fuller led a movement to relocate the congregation to a new location and building nearby the school. For the following decade, Fuller enlarged both the congregation and the school. Reverend Fuller sought to improve the lives of African Americans by fostering a sense of black pride and stressing the importance of education. He wrote, “People who have the right to govern themselves need intelligence.” Under his leadership, the Howe Institute grew both in its student population and in the addition of buildings. In the beginning of the twentieth century, the Howe Institute was one of few schools in Memphis to offer education to blacks above grammar school. The curriculum provided religious as well as a general academic training for students, including classical studies in Greek and Latin. Reverend Fuller was discreet in only publicizing the Institute's industrial training program, which was actually limited to cooking and printing classes. Otherwise, the students received a broad and liberal education.

Reverend Fuller eventually ventured into the possibility of a more activist social and political agenda after a vicious white mob lynched Ell C. Parsons by burning him to death, a grotesque spectacle witnessed by an estimated five thousand men, women, and children in May 1917. The following month, Fuller became one of the initial members of the first chapter of the National Association for the Advancement of Colored People (NACCP) to be established in Memphis. Fuller soon found himself at odds with the organization's denunciation of Tennessee Governor Thomas C. Rye and he allowed his membership to lapse.

But three years later, Fuller played a prominent role in establishing a Memphis chapter of the Commission on Interracial Cooperation (CIC). The CIC rose out of the ashes of considerable racial violence following the end of World War I, especially in 1919. It was a conservative organization that aimed to improve communication between African-American elites and their white counterparts. Like almost everything in the South at this time, the organization operated in a segregated manner, despite its name. White “liberals” formed chapters that then “advised” separate “Colored Divisions.” In general, concluded historian Lester Lamon, the CIC's “motto might have been: Prevent violence at all costs, and improve the black community when possible,” a limited message that had the potential of reaching enlightened white consciousness.25 In Memphis, the CIC operated as a subcommittee of the white Chamber of Commerce and a group of ministers, chaired by Fuller, who headed the Public Welfare League. The organization was commonly known as the Memphis Inter-Racial League (MIL) Fuller took credit for bettering race relations and improving schools and playgrounds in Memphis during the 1920s. The MIL claimed over twelve hundred members, by far the largest and most activist black CIC group in the state. It maintained an office and hired a staff of blacks.26 The League addressed the disrespectful and often brutal treatment of blacks by streetcar operators and policemen brutality of blacks, and complained about insufficient school and recreational facility conditions. Fuller himself wrote to the editor of the Commercial Appeal, requesting the removal of negative terms such as “Darky, nigger, coon, negress, and ‘the black’” when referring to African Americans in the newspaper.27 Through the CIC, Fuller successfully petitioned the city for a change in the name of the “Negro Industrial High School” to “Booker T. Washington High School”. The MIL also spoke out against crime and waged a campaign encouraging the upholding of the law, temperance, and active employment. While some members of the African American community criticized Fuller and other MIL members of acting as “Uncle Toms” to the white community, it cannot be denied that Fuller's methods also reached the intended audience. Fuller often presented his views in the white press. He was so successful at utilizing this venue that he wrote more columns of print than any other African American man in Memphis history. Fuller's visibility within the conservative MIL soon attracted the attention of master politician and powerful machine boss E. H. Crump. Crump began to consult with Fuller, as a “respected” (and conservative) voice of the African-American community, about the dynamics of both the black and white communities in Memphis.

Fuller had hoped that his relationships with white leaders in Memphis would eventually bring lasting benefits to Memphis blacks. In 1927, after Roger Williams University had burned in Nashville, Fuller sought to translate his assumed white support into a new college campus, which would combine Roger Williams with Howe Institute. He purchased property on South Parkway and requested official permission to develop the new institution. However, despite the educational benefits of the college, white civic and business leaders opposed Fuller strongly. Civic clubs were especially vocal in opposition, and city government refused to give Fuller the necessary building permits.

Reverend Fuller took a hiatus from Howe Institute in 1931 and used the time to research and write. Throughout the decade, he published books aimed at increasing African American pride. Titles included Pictorial History of the American Negro (Memphis, 1933), History of the Negro Baptists in Tennessee (Memphis, 1936), Bridging the Racial Chasms (Memphis, 1937), and The Story of the Church Life Among Negroes in Memphis (1938). When these titles are added to his earlier autobiography, Twenty Years in Public Life, 1890–1910, North Carolina-Tennessee (Nashville, 1910), Fuller emerges as one of the most prolific African-American history writers to be published in Tennessee during the first half of the twentieth century. Fuller hoped that by providing the African American history missing from traditional American history narratives, these publications would empower black youth to continue the established progress of their forefathers.

The Depression Era, however, soon threatened the progress of institution- and community- building among Memphis blacks. Public housing projects sometimes replaced established black neighborhoods with new housing segregated for whites only. Other projects reserved for blacks targeted more middle-class black neighborhoods for destruction. In the late 1930s, the Foote Homes project condemned the property of First Colored Baptist Church, Howe Institute, and several other black institutions, businesses, and many residences. In all, according to estimates by the Memphis Housing Authority, Foote Homes would displace 16 white families and 428 black families. The black community, led by Reverend Fuller, protested vigorously that one of the best and most stable black neighborhoods would be destroyed in the name of progress. Mayor Walter Overton, Crump, and housing officials ignored their pleas and the congregation of First Colored Baptist Church found itself looking for a new home as the wrecking ball demolished their handsome brick church building. As historian Roger Biles concluded, the “controversial case of Foote Homes” was a “cause celebre in the black community.” The rather sorry outcome of destroying a middle-class neighborhood in the name of progressive New Deal slum clearance confirmed to many Memphis blacks that “the primary function of public housing was not only to maintain existing patterns of racial segregation, but also to further concentrate blacks in designated sections of the city.”

Although uprooted by federal funding and short-sighted local decisions, church members purchased a new site at 682 South Lauderdale Street that had meaningful historical associations to both the past and present of the church. The large lot held the historic Sanford home, a Second Empire-style dwelling. According to accounts published in Memphis newspapers in the mid-1930s, legend had it that the dwelling once housed some of the Confederate government's treasury. In 1935, the Methodist Missionary Society and Negro Model Missionary Society had acquired the dwelling in order to remodel it into a settlement center. The two groups worked together to develop a center of social service work for African Americans and called it the Bethlehem Center. This was the first social center for blacks in Memphis. Black ministers paid the rent for the building by saving coupons.34 The Bethlehem House organized kindergarten classes, youth clubs, and sewing lessons for area blacks.35 The Bethlehem Center moved two years later, and the First Colored Baptist Church purchased the property in 1939.

According to church historian Rosa Murrell, Reverend T. O. Fuller selected the new building's Classical Revival style after surveying and visiting other recently constructed churches in the city. The builder was Samuel F. Scott and the contractor was Edgar H. Davis. Fuller located the new building in front of the Sanford House so that the house could remain in use as a church office and as his parsonage. It stood directly across from the Booker T. Washington High School and adjacent to the T. H. Hayes and Sons Funeral Home, the city's oldest African- American business. Thus, at this one spot in the city stood three of the most important educational, religious, and business anchors of the mid-twentieth century African-American community.

While the church was under construction, First Baptist members worshiped in Booker T. Washington High School across the street. Once completed in 1939, the new church building became home to expanded social and community programs. A group of Boy Scouts had begun meeting at First Baptist in its earlier location on St. Paul Avenue, and the first troop of Girl Scouts were organized at the church's new South Lauderdale location in 1942. Both groups continue to make the First Baptist Church their headquarters. The church has also enjoyed a close association with the Booker T. Washington High School.36 This relationship began when Reverend Fuller successfully pushed for the school's name change in honor of the Alabama educator. First Baptist members held services in the high school gymnasium while the church building was under construction across the street. Church elder Blair T. Hunt was principal at the high school and also an ordained minister from the congregation. Booker T. Washington High School reunions often include the option to attend Sunday services at First Baptist Church, Lauderdale because it was the religious home for many students. Most school class photographs after 1939 were taken on the steps of the church building. The church also participated in the Inter-faith women's ministry, which brings together women of different religious faiths. This group initiated and implemented projects that improved the city of Memphis.38 In addition to civic involvement, music plays a defining role in the First Baptist tradition and is significantly associated with the 1939 church building. Various church clubs have sponsored touring musicians such as Naomi Moody, James Hyter, and Dr. Leroy Van Johnson. In addition to sponsoring prominent musicians, the First Baptist Church takes pride in the musical talent of its membership. The annual performance of Handel's Messiah demonstrates their accomplished musical talent. This tradition began at the new building in 1941 when First Baptist members were turned away or forced to sit in a segregated area at the white Calvary Episcopal Church's Messiah performance.40 Frustrated by this treatment, the members complained to Reverend Fuller, who encouraged them to perform the Messiah themselves. The first performance was at the church in 1941 and the tradition has continued each year since its inception and has become one of the most notable musical events in Memphis during the Christmas season. Most members of the “Messiah choir” have participated in the tradition for at least twenty years.41 The late James Ural Rhodes, a notable musician and First Baptist Sunday School Superintendent, played an integral role in the Messiah productions for fifty years.

Fuller lived at the parsonage until his death in 1942. His successor was Dr. James Madison Nabrit Sr., of Atlanta. A graduate of Morehouse College, Nabrit was president of the American Baptist Seminar and the National Baptist Missionary Training School in Nashville. After his father's death in 1947, Dr. H. Clarke Nabrit, a graduate of Crozier Theological Seminar, became the church's minister, The Sanford home was converted in 1950–1951 to the church's educational building, according to plans drawn by S. F. Scott, who listed himself as a designer. Scott's plans called for a new brick rectangular shell to be built around the dwelling and as it was completed, old exterior walls were demolished. Scott left several interior elements intact, including the entrance and staircase. Once completed and dedicated in 1952, the education building served similar purposes for African American youth as it did years before when it was known as the Bethlehem Center.

The death of Fuller, the conversion of his home into offices and classrooms, and the rise of a new generation of leaders within the church led the congregation into new directions during the 1950s. The tenor of these new times were perhaps best expressed by officially changing the chartered name of the church from the “First Colored Baptist Church” to the “First Baptist Church, Lauderdale” in 1954. The congregation also associated itself with the rise of the NAACP in Memphis from the mid-1950s to the mid-1960s. Reverend Dr. H. Clarke Nabrit offered the church to the organization for its monthly meetings. During Nabrit's tenure, the church discontinued its affiliation with the National Baptist Convention, USA, Inc. in 1963 due to a controversy surrounding the convention's lack of support for the actions of Reverend Martin Luther King Jr. The congregation of First Baptist, Lauderdale began a dual alignment with the Progressive National Baptist Convention, Inc., and the American Baptist Convention.43 Nabrit also expanded the church's Christian education programs and community outreach. Nabrit stayed at the helm until 1968, placing himself and his church at the forefront of civil rights activities during those years. Prominent Civil Rights Movement leaders who spoke at the church included Reverend James Lawson, Reverend Billy Kyles, and Father Joseph A. Durick, along with the congregation's own Reverend R. L. Norsworthy, who was among the leaders of the integration of the Glenview neighborhood in the late 1950s, and Reverend Benjamin Hooks. Hooks is clearly the most significant individual from the church congregation associated with the national Civil Rights Movement. Hooks graduated from Booker T. Washington High School in 1941, attended LeMoyne College and Howard University, and served in the U. S. Army, rising to the rank of staff sergeant. After leaving the army in 1946, Hooks took his law degree from DePaul University in 1948 and returned to Memphis to practice law. In 1956 Hooks became the pastor of the Greater Middle Baptist Church. Governor Frank G. Clement appointed Hooks as a judge in the new Criminal Court Division IV, the first such position held by an African American in Tennessee since Reconstruction, in 1965. Seven years later, President Richard Nixon appointed Hooks to the Federal Communications Commission, where he was the first African American to serve on that board. In 1976 Hooks resigned his position to accept the executive director position of the National Association for the Advancement of Colored People, a leadership role he held until 1993.

From the beginnings of worship in a brush arbor to the year 2000's fifty-ninth performance of Handel's Messiah, First Baptist Church, Lauderdale's legacy is alive in every era of Memphis history. Through a tradition of civic duty, made possible through strong religious leaders, the First Baptist congregation made an impact on African-American religion in Memphis. The church building at 682 South Lauderdale reflects a congregational history that reaches back 135 years. Many parallels exist between the history of the First Baptist Church and the struggle for civil rights in Memphis. After the Civil War, early congregation members rejected white paternalism in their religious institutions. Women members of the congregation were vital contributors to these new institutions from the beginning. Today that tradition continues through the work of the Ladies Aid Club (established 1913) at First Baptist, Lauderdale. When white mob violence in the first part of the twentieth century intimidated the black community, First Baptist provided visible leadership in Reverend Fuller's message of racial cooperation and emphasis on black education. The congregation answered Jim Crow exclusion in many ways, most notably in 1941 by beginning its own celebration of the Messiah, a tradition that continues today. During the Civil Rights Movement, First Baptist Church was a critical stop for influential leaders and meetings. The church continues its legacy of community leadership today with groups such as the Women's Inter-faith ministry. As a building whose architectural style he choose, and as the only extant building in Memphis significantly associated with his career, the church building at 682 South Lauderdale also reflects the Reverend Thomas O. Fuller's impact on Memphis education, history, and religion. Although a state park in Shelby County is named for Fuller, this honor came after his death and is far removed from the neighborhood where Fuller lived and devoted his career to the betterment of its residents. This church building and its prolific congregation stand as a living tribute to his legacy.
