= List of Phi Beta Sigma conclaves =

Phi Beta Sigma is an international historically African American collegiate fraternity. The conclave is the legislative power of Phi Beta Sigma. During a conclave year, delegates representing all of the active chapters from within the seven regions of the fraternity meet in the chosen city. The conclave or fraternity convention is currently held biannually and is usually hosted by graduate chapters of the chosen city. The host city is chosen through a selection process in which each of the eligible regions nominates a city and a formal bid is submitted. As of 2009, Phi Beta Sigma has held over 95 conventions in various cities throughout the United States The fraternity held its first conclave in Washington, D.C. in 1916.

== Conclave ==
The conclave is the legislative power of Phi Beta Sigma. During a conclave year, delegates representing all of the active chapters from within the seven regions of the fraternity meet in the chosen city. The conclave or fraternity convention is currently held biannually and is usually hosted by the graduate chapters of the chosen city. The host city is chosen through a selection process in which each eligible region nominates a city and a formal bid is submitted. The region in which the current conclave is being held is ineligible for submitting a bid for the succeeding conclave.

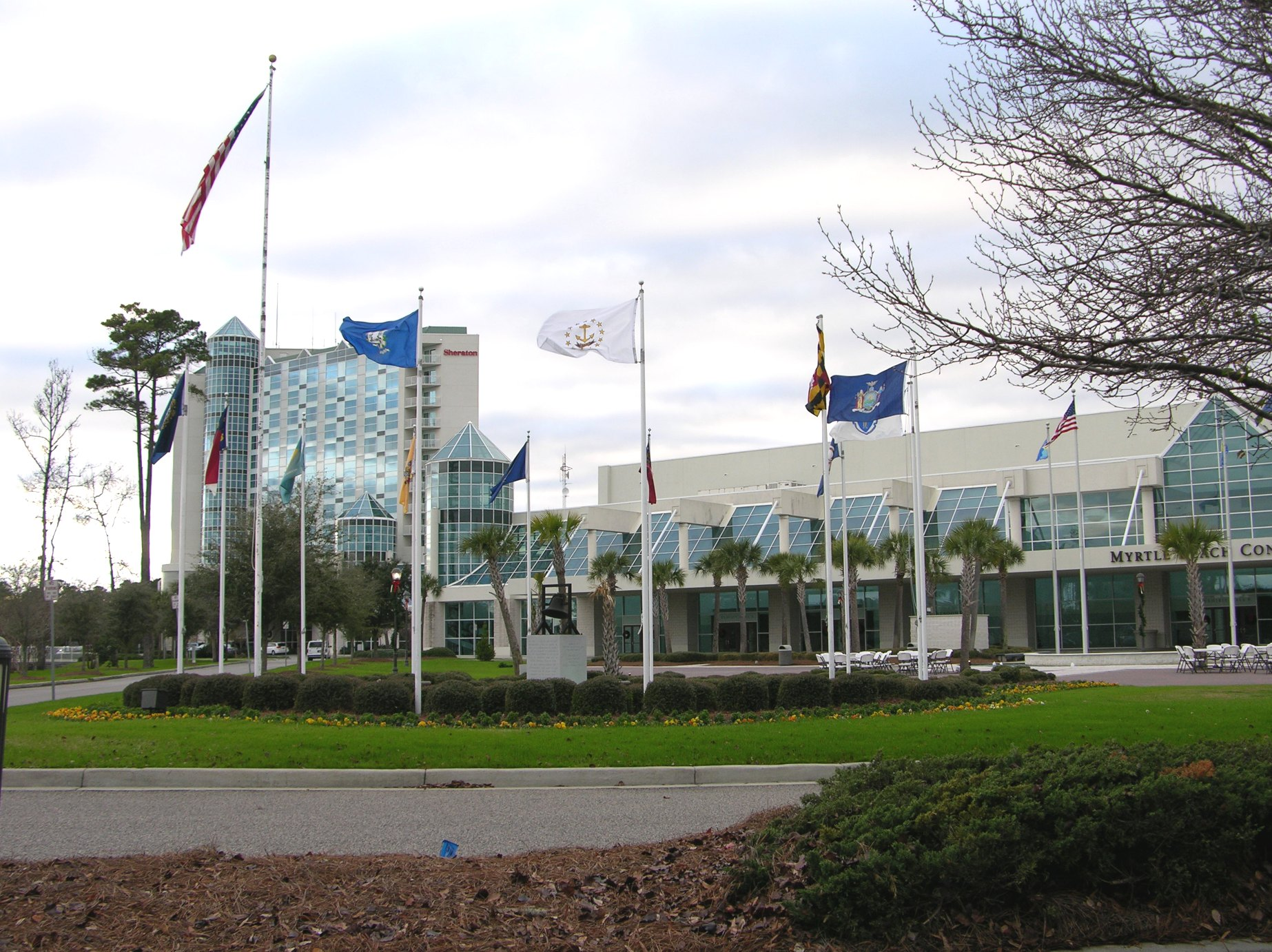
Myrtle Beach Convention Center, 2021 Conclave

During the convention, members of the General Board – the administrative body of the fraternity-are elected and appointed. The general board may act in the interest of the fraternity when the conclave is not in session. In addition, seminars, social events, concerts, an international Miss Phi Beta Sigma Pageant, Stepshow, and oratorical contests are also held during the week-long conference. Throughout the years, notable individuals such as George Washington Carver and Carter G. Woodson were speakers at conclaves.

Phi Beta Sigma's first conclave was held on December 28 and 29, 1916 in Washington, D.C. It was attended by 200 members from three collegiate chapters: Alpha, Beta, and Gamma. However, no conclaves were held in 1917 and 1918 because of World War I.

The following list of conclaves includes actual, proposed, and forthcoming international conventions of Phi Beta Sigma.

== List of conclaves ==
Number	Dates	Location	Host	References
1st	December 28, 1916 – December 29, 1916	Phi Beta Sigma House; 1907 Third Street NW; Washington, D.C.		(Note: At this conclave, an official publication for the fraternity was authorized, with member W.F. Vincent as the National Editor.)
2nd	December 1919	Washington, D.C.		(Note: At this conclave, the General Board approved founder A. Langston Taylor to assist in the organization of what was to become the sister sorority Zeta Phi Beta.)
3rd	December 26, 1920 – December 28, 1920	Washington, D.C.		(Note: This was the first joint Conclave/Boule with Zeta Phi Beta.)
4th	December 27, 1921 – December 31, 1921	Atlanta, Georgia		(Note: This was the first inter-fraternity conference between Phi Beta Sigma and Omega Psi Phi.)
5th	December 1922	Baltimore, Maryland		
6th	December 1923	Nashville, Tennessee		
7th	December 26, 1924 – December 31, 1924	YMCA Building; Philadelphia, Pennsylvania	Epsilon	
8th	December 27, 1925 – December 30, 1925	Richmond, Virginia	Lambda	(Note: At this conclave, Bigger and Better Business was established as a national program.)
9th	December 1926	Greensboro, North Carolina		
10th	December 1927	St. Louis, Missouri	Kappa Sigma	(Note: During this conclave, the fraternity was divided into 4 Regions (Eastern, Northern, Southern & Western) with a director of each Region. These directors were known as the Vice-Presidents.)
11th	December 1928	Louisville, Kentucky		(Note: In this conclave, branding the skin with a hot iron, as a part of the initiation process, was officially frowned upon.)
12th	December 1929	New York City, New York	Epsilon Sigma and Kappa Beta Sigma	(Note: The Distinguished Service Chapter was established at this conclave.)
13th	December 1930	Tuskegee, Alabama		
		Nashville, Tennessee		(Note: Although planned, no conclaves were held in 1931 and 1932 due to the Great Depression.)
14th	December 27, 1933 – December 30, 1933	Chicago, Illinois		
15th	December 27, 1934 – December 30, 1934	Washington, D.C.		
16th	December 27, 1935 – December 30, 1935	Atlanta, Georgia		(Note: At this conclave, Omega founders Edgar Amos Love and Oscar James Cooper brought greetings on behalf of the members of Omega Psi Phi.)
17th	December 1936 – December 31, 1936	New York City, New York		(Note: This was the 2nd joint Conclave/Boule with Zeta Phi Beta.)
18th	December 29, 1937	Detroit, Michigan		
19th	December 27, 1938 – December 30, 1938	Winston-Salem, North Carolina		
20th	December 26, 1939 – December 30, 1939	Howard University; Washington, D.C.		(Note: This was the Silver (25th) Anniversary Conclave.)
21st	December 1940	Tuskegee, Alabama		(Note: The fraternity voted to become a permanent member of the National Negro Business League.)
22nd	December 1941	Academy of Music; Philadelphia, Pennsylvania		
		Richmond, Virginia		(Note: Conclave was scheduled for December 1942 but was canceled due to World War II. There was also no conclave in 1943.)
23rd	1944	Chicago, Illinois		(Note: This was the first conclave held in the spring. At it, the fraternity voted to support the United Negro College Fund.)
24th	December 27, 1945 – December 30, 1945	St. Louis, Missouri		(Note: This was the 3rd joint Conclave/Boule with Zeta Phi Beta.)
25th	1946	New Orleans, Louisiana		(Note: At this conclave, the fraternity became a permanent member of the National Negro Business League.)
26th	December 27, 1947 – December 30, 1947	Atlanta, Georgia		
27th	August 9, 1948 – August 14, 1948	Los Angeles, California		(Note: This was the first conclave held in the summer.)
28th	December 27, 1949 – December 30, 1949	Washington, D.C.	Alpha Sigma	(Note: This conclave celebrated the fraternity's 35th Anniversary.)
29th	1950	New York City, New York		
30th	1951	Birmingham, Alabama		
31st	December 27, 1952 – December 30, 1952	Slaughter's Hotel and George Carver Elementary; Richmond, Virginia	Lambda and Iota Sigma	(Note: The conclave's theme was Full Democracy–Nothing Less Business.)
32nd	December 1953	Detroit, Michigan		
33rd	December 27, 1954 – December 30, 1954	Norfolk, Virginia	Beta Sigma	(Note: The conclave's theme was "Education - The Key to Freedom".)
34th	December 27, 1955 – December 30, 1955	Louisville, Kentucky		
35th	1956	Miami, Florida		
36th	December 27, 1957 – December 30, 1957	Dallas, Texas		(Note: This was the 4th joint Conclave/Boule with Zeta Phi Beta.)
37th	December 27, 1958 – December 30, 1958	Chicago, Illinois		
38th	December 26, 1959 – December 30, 1959	Washington, D.C.	Alpha, Alpha Sigma, and Gamma Lambda	(Note: This conclave celebrated the fraternity's 45th Anniversary.)
39th	December 27, 1960 – December 30, 1960	Hotel Park Sheraton; New York City, New York	Epsilon Sigma	(Note: The conclave's theme was Reassessing Our Role Of Leadership For Culture And Service.)
40th	1961	Philadelphia, Pennsylvania		
41st	1962	Pick Carter Hotel; Cleveland, Ohio		
42nd	1963	Nashville, Tennessee		
43rd	December 26, 1964 – December 30, 1964	Washington, D.C.	Alpha, Alpha Sigma, and Gamma Lambda	(Note: This conclave celebrated the fraternity's 50th Anniversary. Its theme was "A Past to Cherish, A Future to Fulfill".)
44th	1966	Los Angeles, California		
45th	1967	Richmond, Virginia		
46th	August 12, 1969 – August 16, 1969	Sheraton-Belvedere Hotel; Baltimore, Maryland	Zeta Sigma	(Note: The conclave's theme was Brotherhood–A Universal Necessity.)
47th	1970	Winston-Salem, North Carolina		
48th	August 15, 1972 – August 19, 1972	Fontainebleau Miami Beach; Miami Beach, Florida		
49th	1973	Houston, Texas		
50th	August 4, 1975 – August 9, 1975	Hilton Heritage; Detroit, Michigan	Delta Rho, Gamma Iota, and Iota Beta Sigma	
51st	December 1976	Memphis, Tennessee		
52nd	1978	San Francisco, California		
53rd	December 26, 1979 – December 30, 1979	Hyatt Regency on Capitol Hill; Washington, D.C.		(Note: This conclave celebrated the fraternity's 65th Anniversary.)
54th	July 25, 1981 – July 31, 1981	Charleston, South Carolina		
55th	December 26, 1982 – December 31, 1982	Atlanta, Georgia		
56th	1984	New Orleans, Louisiana		
57th	December 28, 1985	Louisville, Kentucky		
58th	1987	Kansas City, Missouri		(Note: The conclave's theme was Sigma Men in Unity–Rekindling the Spirit of Service to Community.)
59th	August 8, 1989 – August 13, 1989	Washington, D.C.		(Note: This conclave celebrated the fraternity's 75th Anniversary.)
60th	July 1991	Las Vegas, Nevada		(Note: This was the 5th joint Conclave/Boule with Zeta Phi Beta.)
61st	August 4, 1993 – August 8, 1993	Raleigh, North Carolina		
62nd	July 11, 1995 – July 16, 1995	Washington, D.C.		
63rd	June 30, 1997 – July 6, 1997	Orlando, Florida		(Note: The conclave's theme was A Family Affair.)
64th	July 6, 1999 – July 11, 1999	Fairmont Hotel; Dallas, Texas		
65th	July 9, 2001 – July 15, 2001	Detroit, Michigan		
66th	July 8, 2003 – July 13, 2003	Memphis Marriott Hotel; Memphis, Tennessee		(Note: The conclave's theme was Coming Home. During the conclave, the general board approved Project S.W.W.A.C., Project S.A.A.T.P, and Project Vote as the fraternity's national programs.)
67th	July 12, 2005 – July 17, 2005	Sheraton Universal Hotel; Universal City, California		
68th	July 30, 2007 – August 5, 2007	Westin Hotel; Charlotte, North Carolina	Beta Rho Sigma	
69th	July 6, 2009 – July 12, 2009	New Orleans, Louisiana		(Note: The conclave's theme was Celebrating the Dream.)
70th	July 20, 2011 – July 24, 2011	Sheraton Hotel; Atlanta, Georgia		(Note: The conclave's theme is Living The Legacy: Marching Toward The Jubilee.)
71st	July 9, 2013 – July 14, 2013	Philadelphia Marriott Downtown; Philadelphia, Pennsylvania		(Note: The conclave's theme was POWER UP! Marching Towards the Jubilee.)
Centennial Celebration	July 16, 2014 – July 20, 2014	Marriott Wardman Park; Washington, D.C.		(Note: This conclave's theme was Celebrating One Century of Service.)
72nd	July 15, 2015 – July 19, 2015	Little Rock Marriott; Little Rock, Arkansas		(Note: The conclave's theme is I am My Brother's Keeper.)
73rd	July 18, 2017 – July 23, 2017	Detroit Marriott at the Renaissance Center; Detroit, Michigan		(Note: The conclave's theme was A Family Reunion.)
74th	July 9, 2019 – July 14, 2019	Westgate Las Vegas Resort & Casino; Las Vegas, Nevada		(Note: The conclave's theme is The Pride and The Power: Celebrating African-American Men.)
75th	August 3, 2021 – August 8, 2021	Myrtle Beach Convention Center; Myrtle Beach, South Carolina		(Note: The conclave's theme was A Brotherhood of Conscious Men. One Conclave: Two Experiences.)
76th	July 11, 2023 – July 16, 2023	George R. Brown Convention Center; Houston, Texas		(Note: The conclave's theme was Believe In Our Power, Leading The Movement.)
77th	July 14, 2025 – July 20, 2025	Tampa Convention Center Tampa, Florida	Gamma Eta Sigma	(Note: The conclave's theme was "Dream BIG, Act BOLD, Always BELIEVE".)
78th	July 26, 2027 – August 1, 2027	Gaylord National Resort & Convention Center National Harbor, Maryland		(Note: The conclave's theme was "The Shift Is Now!: When Vision Meets Action.")
