= Payne Institute =

Payne Institute may refer:

- Payne Institute, forerunner of Allen University in South Carolina
- Payne Institute, forerunner of Payne College in Georgia
- Payne Institute, one of the names used for Daniel Payne College in Birmingham, Alabama
- Payne Institute for Public Policy, at the Colorado School of Mines, serves as a nexus for high-quality, data-driven, solutions-oriented research and dialogue needed to inform energy and environmental policy.
