= Howe Institute =

Howe Institute may refer to:

- Howe Institute (Louisiana), African-American private primary and grammar school (1888 to 1933) in New Iberia, Louisiana, U.S.
- Howe Institute (Tennessee), African-American college (1888 to 1937) in Memphis, Tennessee, U.S.
- C. D. Howe Institute, Canadian non-profit policy research organization in Toronto, Ontario
