= Leonard F. Morse =

American academic administrator (1891–1961)

- Morse c. 1956
- Born: Leonard Francis Morse; January 12, 1891; New Bedford, Massachusetts, U.S.
- Died: May 22, 1961 (aged 70); Jacksonville, Florida, U.S.
- Occupations: Educator, academic administrator, and minister
- Known for: Co-founder and first president of Phi Beta Sigma

Academic background
- Education: Howard University, A.B. 1912 and B.Ed. 1915 Daniel Payne College, BDiv 1920; Northwestern University, M.A.1929 College of Metaphysics, DMETA and Psy.D., 1953

Academic work
- Discipline: Education
- Institutions: Edward Waters College Daniel Payne College Bethel College

Leonard Francis Morse (January 12, 1891 – May 22, 1961) was an American academic administrator, minister, and fraternalist. He was a dean and president of Edward Waters College. Morse was also a founder and the first president of the Phi Beta Sigma fraternity.

== Early life ==
Leonard Francis Morse was born on January 12, 1891, in New Bedford, Massachusetts. His parents were Annie M. (née Gainville) and Frederick J. Morse. Morse attended Middle Street Grammar School in New Bedford, graduating in 1908. He was captain of a basketball team at the local YMCA and played the violin.

When he was in ninth grade, Morse wrote the play, The Winning of Margaret, which was presented in the local Oddfellows Hall with Morse in the cast. He attended New Bedford High School and graduated as the class valedictorian of his integrated high school.

Morse attended Howard University, graduating from its academy with a A.B. degree in June 1912 and with a B.Ed. from its Teacher's College in 1915. When he graduated from the academy, he received one of two scholarships to attend the Teacher's College. He also received the first scholarship awarded to a graduate of Teacher's College and was the first male to graduate in three years from Howard's four-year B.Ed. program. At Howard, he was president of the Young Men's Progressive Club and the director of social service at the YMCA. He was a co-founder and the first president of the Phi Beta Sigma fraternity in 1914, and author of the fraternity's constitution. While still a student, he taught and tutored in five foreign languages.

Morse went on to earn a Bachelor of Divinity from Daniel Payne College in 1920. He then attended Northwestern University where he received a Master of Arts degree in 1929. He received a Doctor of Metaphysics and a Doctor of Psychology, summa cum laud, from the College of Metaphysics in Indianapolis, in 1953.

== Career ==
Morse was licensed as a minister of the African Methodist Episcopal Church (AME) in 1917. He was ordained in 1920. Five years later, he was ordained as an elder of the church. He was the pastor Ebenezer AME Zion Church in Moblie, Alabama and churches in Clearwater, Florida; Lake City, Florida; Live Oak, Florida; St. Augustine, Florida; St. Petersburg, Florida; and Mount Zion A.M.E. Church in Tampa, Florida. He also was the presiding elder of several AME districts in Florida. At the time of his death, he was the assistant pastor of St. Paul AME Church in Jacksonville, Florida.

In addition to preaching, Morse taught at schools and colleges. His first position was principal of a school in Dover, Delaware; followed by positions in Portsmouth, Virginia; and Louisiana. He was the dean of Daniel Payne College while studying theology there. Next, he was the dean of Bethel College in Alabama, resigning after one year. He aired his grievances with Bethel College in the Southern Christian Recorder on June 15, 1922.

In 1922, Morse became a teacher with the Mobile County Training School, becoming its principal and the director of the Summer School for Teachers of Mobile, Alabama in 1923. After seven years with the Mobile Public School System, he became the principal of the Fesseden Academy in Ocala, Florida in 1929. He also taught at Southern University and the Alabama Agricultural and Mechanical College.

In December 1932, Morse was selected to be the president of Edward Waters College. He later had other positions at Edward Waters, including a professor in the Department of Social Science and the Department of History and Political Science, a vice dean and dean of Benjamin F. Lee Theological Seminary, and head of the Department of Religious Studies. At the time of his death, he was head of the university's Department of Social Science.

In the 1940s and 1950s, Morse was a syndicated newspaper reporter for the Associated Negro Press and the Southern editor of Global News Syndicate, focusing on Black issues. He wrote books about church administration, pastoral theology, and the history of the African Methodist Episcopal Church. In 1956, he opened the Leonard F. Morse Language Studium in Jacksonville, teaching high school students, college students, and adults beginning and advanced cources in English, French, German, Greek, Italian, Latin, Portuguese, and Spanish.

== Honors ==
Morse was made a member-at-large for life of the Pi Gamma Mu in 1926; this was notable at the time because it was an honor society for white people. He received an honorary Doctor of Divinity from Allen University and an honorary Doctor of Laws from Edward Waters College.

Edward Waters College established the Dr. Leonard F. Morse Award for the best use of the campus. On January 12, 2019, the town of Bedford, Massachusetts, celebrated Leonard F. Morse Day.

== Personal life ==
Morse married Gertrude Frances Goldsmith on July 7, 1925. The couple had five children: Mary Helen Morse, Dorothy Morse, Frederick G. Morse, Ward, and Leonard F. Morse Jr.

In 1922, Morse was the superintendent of exhibits for the Negro Building of the Gulf States Fair. He was a Mason and a member and president of the Phi Beta Sigma Service Key chapter. He established numerous chapters of Phi Beta Sigma and served as the fraternity's state director for Florida. He was the Southern regional director, senior delegate, and acting president of the National Pan-Hellenic Council.

Morse died in Brewster Hospital of Jacksonville, Florida, on May 22, 1961, at the age of 70. He was buried in Mt. Olive Memorial Park in Jacksonville.
