= Howe Institute (Tennessee) =

African-American college (1888–1937)

Coordinates: 35.132°N 90.047°W

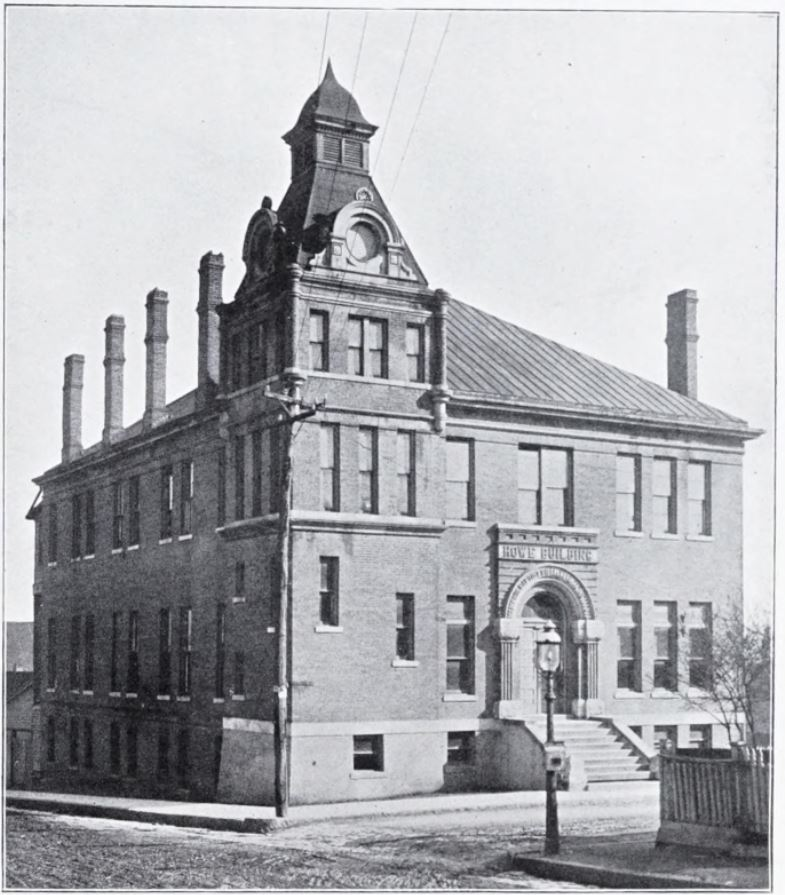
Howe Building, c. 1910

The Howe Institute, originally called as the Memphis Baptist Bible and Normal Institute, was an American training school for African Americans. It was founded in Memphis, Tennessee in 1888 by the Afro-American Baptists of Tennessee. Sometime before 1909, its name changed to the Howe Institute. Later, it was called Howe Collegiate Institute and Howe Junior College. The college closed during the Great Depression and merged with LeMoyne College in 1937.

== History ==
On September 22, 1887, a charter was registered for the Memphis Baptist Bible and Normal Institute. Its incorporators—A. L. Black, W. A. Brinkley, A. Fields, Jerome Howe, M. Jones, M. Mayo, Hardin Smith, W. A. Taylor, and J. Warner—were African Americans. The charter stated the institute's purpose was to train preachers for missionary duties. A Brief History of Negro Baptist Work in Tennessee 1835-1935

The incorporators met in April 1888 and elected a board of trustees that included:

- Rev. A. L. Black of Milan, Tennessee
- Rev. W. A. Brinkley of Memphis, Tennessee
- Rev. R. N. Countee of Memphis, Tennessee
- Rev. T. R. Guyton of Guyton, Mississippi
- Rev. G. W. Harvey of Batesville, Mississippi
- Rev. Jerome Howe of Wenona, Illinois
- Rev. G. W. Lacy of Woodville, Tennessee
- Rev. A. Mauncy of Bells, Tennessee
- Rev. M. Mayo of Memphis, Tennessee
- Rev. H. C. Owen of Stanton, Tennessee
- Rev. T. J. Searcy of Brownsville, Tennessee
- Rev. Hardin Smith of Carolina, Tennessee
- Rev. J. H. Varilue of Como, Mississippi
- Rev. M. Vann of Dyersberg, Tennessee
- Rev. A. W. Williams of Rives, Tennessee

Smith was elected the president.

The Memphis Baptist and Normal Institute opened in Memphis, Tennessee in 1888. It was one of the few institutions to offer an education beyond grammar school for African Americans and was one of the first private educational institutions for Black students in Memphis. It was owned and operated by the Afro-American Baptists of Tennessee.

When the normal institute opened, it provided industrial and mental training, along with Bible studies. It taught culinary arts, needlework, and nursing for girls and various industries for boys. The school also trained students who worked in its public laundry. Its students were trained to became domestic workers, available for hire through an application process.

While the campus was under construction, the normal institute's classes were held in a local church. Land for the campus and a building was funded through the $10,000 gift of Peter Howe of Wenona, Illinois. The property was at the intersection of Wellington an Frasier Streets. Its building was designed by architect Charles Christopher Burke of Memphis and its cornerstone was laid on June 28, 1888.

The institute's name was changed to Howe Institute sometime before 1909. Later, it was called Howe Collegiate Institute and Howe Junior College.

In 1902, Rev. Thomas O. Fuller, Ph.D, became its interim principal. However, he remained in the position of principal for 27 years. Fuller oversaw the expansion of student population and expanded the campus from one to five buildings. In 1908, there were twelve faculty, besides Reverend Fuller. In 1910, it had 395 students from nine states, as well as 200 local students in Bible training. The campus was evaluated at $60,000.

The Howe Institute had no endowment and relied on support from tuitions and donations. During the Great Depression, declining support forced its closure. The institute sold its buildings and merged with LeMoyne College in 1937.

== Campus ==
Howe Institute campus originally consisted of the Howe Building. Later, the three-story brick Industrial Shop was added to house the printing and sewing departments; this building was built by students and was valued at $10,000 in 1910. In total the campus included five buildings, including the Teacher's College building, the Domestic Science Building, the Clara Howe Dormitory for girls, and the principal's cottage.

== Academics ==
In 1908, the instiute's departments were Literary, Industrial (sewing, printing, basketry), Ministerial, Missionary Training, and Stenography and Typewriting. It also provided Bible training for women. The institute's students did settlement work.

== Notable alumni ==
- William Herbert Brewster Sr., composer of gospel music, poet, and playwright
- Hugh Gloster, president of Morehouse College
- Mordecai Wyatt Johnson, pastor and president of Howard University
- A. Langston Taylor, civil rights and labor activist; founder of Phi Beta Sigma
- Richard Wright, author of novels, short stories, poems, and non-fiction
- Mordecai Wyatt Johnson, first black president of Howard University
