= Thomas O. Fuller =

American politician and Baptist minister (1867–1942)

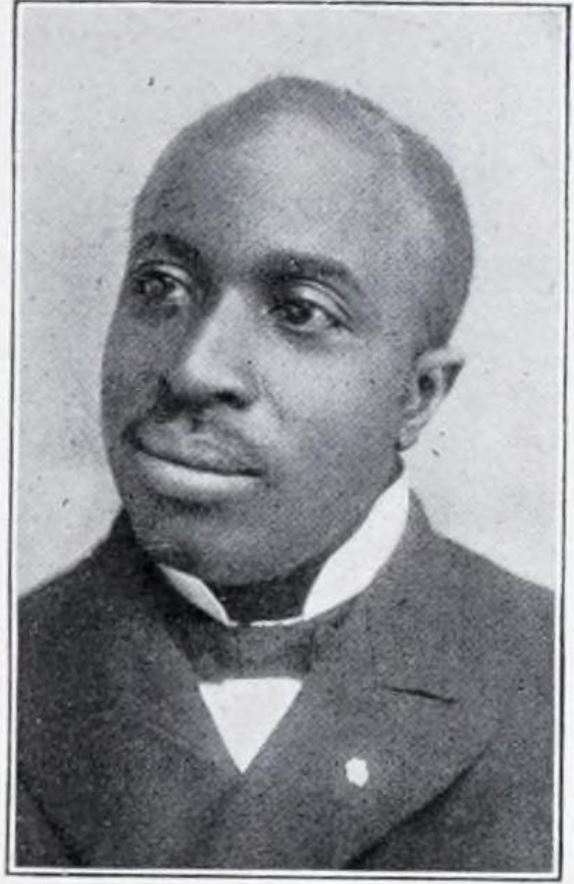

Member of the North Carolina Senate from the 11th district
- In office 1899–1899

Personal details
- Born: Thomas Oscar Fuller; October 25, 1867 Franklinton, North Carolina, U.S.
- Died: June 21, 1942 (aged 74) Memphis, Tennessee, U.S.
- Party: Republican
- Spouse: Laura B. Faulkner (m. 1898; died 1901) Rosa B. Allen Baker (m. 1904; died 1916) Dixie E. Williams (m. 1918; died 1940)
- Occupation: Politician, Baptist Minister

Thomas Oscar Fuller (October 25, 1867 – June 21, 1942) was an American Baptist minister, educator and state senator. He was elected to the North Carolina Senate (district 11) in 1898 and was the only African American senator.

== Biography ==
Thomas Oscar Fuller was born in Franklinton, North Carolina on October 25, 1867. He was the youngest of eight children born to Mary Eliza (née Dent) and J. Henderson Fuller, former slaves. His seven siblings were four brothers (Ashbury, Edward, Joseph, and Marcus), and three sisters (Adaline, Susanna, and Victoria). Thomas was the second child and first son to be born free in the Fuller family after President Abraham Lincoln signed the Emancipation Proclamation. He attended Shaw University in 1885 and graduated in 1890, he also received a master's degree in 1893.

Thomas Fuller married Laura B. Faulkner in her hometown of Warren County, North Carolina on June 23, 1898. In 1900 Thomas and Laura Fuller left North Carolina, and Thomas became the minister of the First Colored Baptist Church in Memphis, Tennessee. The couple had two sons, Thomas Oscar Jr (1900-1956) and Erskine (1901-1908). Thomas was ordained by Wake County Baptist Association and in 1902 he was named the principal of the Howe Institute in Memphis.

Laura Fuller died sometime after the birth of Erskine, and Thomas would remarry to Rosa B. Allen on October 31, 1904. Rosa was also a teacher at Howe Institute. Erskine died of Bronchitis at the age of 7 on November 23, 1908. This death in the family would be followed by Rosa on July 3, 1916 aged 43. Thomas would remarry a third time to Dixie E. Williams in Richmond, Virginia on June 5, 1918. Dixie would pass away aged 67 on November 10, 1940, followed by Thomas aged 74 on June 21, 1942.

The T. O. Fuller State Park is named in his honour.

== Works ==
- Twenty Years in Public Life, 1890-1910. 1910.
- Flashes and Gems of Thought and Eloquence. 1920.
- Pictorial History of the American Negro. 1933.
- History of the Negro Baptists of Tennessee. 1936.
- Bridging the Racial Chasms. 1937.
- The Story of the Church Life Among Negroes in Memphis, Tennessee. 1938.
- Notes on Parliamentary Law. 1940.
