= A. Langston Taylor =

African American activist and fraternalist (1890–1953)

Abram Langston Taylor (January 29, 1890 – April 8, 1953) was an African American civil rights and labor activist, fraternalist, clubsman, and educator. He was the national president of the United Domestic Workers of America, the African Aid Society, and the American Industrial League. Taylor co-founded and was the first national president of the Phi Beta Sigma fraternity and helped establish the Zeta Phi Beta sorority. He founded and served as president of the short-lived Taylor University and The Taylor Art Museum.

== Early life ==
Taylor was born on January 29, 1890, in Sommerville, Tennessee. He attended the Howe Institute in Memphis, Tennessee. He then attended Howard University. While at Howard, he was a co-founder of Phi Beta Sigma fraternity in January 1914.

He then attended Frelinghuysen University in Washington, D.C., where he earned a law degree. At Frelinghuysen, he was the student body president. Taylor earned a Ph.D. in physiotherapy from the National University of Theraputics.

== Career ==
Taylor was a lawyer who possibly practiced in Washington, D.C. Later, he became a physiotherapist. He retired from the Smithsonian Institution in 1949; the 1940 United States census notes that he was a custodian. In his retirement, Taylor sold cosmetics and home goods. He also operated an investment and insurance company.

=== Activism ===
Taylor was the national president of the American Industrial League and the United Domestic Workers of America (UDWA). He was also the chairman of the Citizens' Committee on Police Brutality and the Housing Committee of the Washington Council of the National Negro Congress.

Taylor was one of forty "well-known Washingians" who sponsored Washington, D.C.'s 1941 campaign for National Sharecroppers Week, to call attention to the plight of America's sharecroppers. In 1943, Taylor became the founding chair of the Washington Civil Rights Committee, a group representived by five state and six local and national organizations that wanted to end the city's poll tax and enfranchise the citizens of the district. Taylor organized the group as a nonpartisan interracial voters' league.

Taylor served on the board of the National Negro Business League. He volunteered as the national president of the African Aid Society, an international charity that worked to benefit African students in Africa and the United States. In this capacity, he testified before the United States Senate Committee on Foreign Relations on April 3, 1950.

Taylor was the vice-chair of the Washington Committee of the Council of African Affairs. He was a representative to the Affiliated Business Associations, as the president of the United Co-Op Alliance. He was also president of the United Cooperative League which campaigned for grocery stores in the city and president general of the Corain Union, helping to plan the National Negro Business Conference in Washington, D.C. in October 1946.

=== Museum and civic center ===
Taylor was the founder, president, and director of the Taylor Art Museum, located in his home in Washington, D.C. The museum was dedicated on January 28, 1945, and changing exhibits and included African American art; one of three institutions to do so at the time in Washington, D.C. In September 1948, the Washington Evening Star noted the museum had a display of thirty African American artworks and a previous exhibit of Potomac Valley landscapes. Its programming included lectures and domastrations by artists. The Taylor Art Museum was open for free on Fridays, Saturdays, Sundays, and holidays, from 6 p.m. to 10 p.m.

In 1946, Taylor became the director of Caroline Hall, a civic center of sorts that he operated in his home. Caroline Hall was the meeting place for groups such as the Corain Union, the Little Forum, and the Washington Committee of the Council of African Affairs. It also included the African Library and the Taylor Art Museum.

=== Education ===
In 1947, Taylor was the director of the Co-operative Institute which offered a twelve-week certificate program taught at Caroline Hall. On October 28, 1950, Taylor established and served as the president of Taylor University, which operated out of his home. Taylor University offered day and night classes through its College of Adult Education, College of Business Education, and College of Religious Education. Taylor donated $25,000 to establish the university.

== Clubsman and fraternalist ==
When in high school, Taylor had the idea of creating a new Greek letter fraternity when he attended Howard University. In January 1914, he co-founded Phi Beta Sigma. After college, he continued to be active in Phi Beta Sigma, serving as its first national president of the fraternity for three years. He served an additional nine years, twelve consecutive years in total, as Sigma's national treasurer, executive secretary, and field secretary. Later, he was president of Sigma's Distinguished Service Chapter.

In 1920, Taylor helped established Zeta Phi Beta sorority. He also helped form the Housewives League in Washington, D.C. in 1933. He helped re-form the historical Amphion Glee Club.

In 1938, Taylor and three other doctors established the Derby Club in Washington, D.C. Turner served as the president of this social organization for multiple terms. He also co-founded the Maxzolians and was a founding board member and vice president of the Mu-So-Lit Club. Taylor was the president of the Associated Artists of Washington, the recorder of the Banneker Research Society, and was a member of the Maceo Literary and Dramatic Club, the National Music and Literary Society, and the Worth While Club.

Taylor was a 33rd degree Mason and belonged to the Pythagorus Lodge no. 9 of the Ancient Free and Accepted Masons and was the master of cermeonies for the Jonathan Davis consistory. He was a member and worthy master of the Hagar Fountain of the Grand United Order of True Reformers. He was also a member of the Benevolent and Protective Order of Elks lodge no.85.

== Personal life ==
Taylor moved to the Washington, D.C. area around 1913. In the 1930s, he lived at 1735 Ninth Street, Northwest and in an apartment at 1960 Second Street, Northwest. Later, his home was Caroline Hall at 1517 Vermont Avenue. He did not marry.

Taylor served on the board of the National Negro Opera Company and was president of the Frelinghuysen University General Alumni Association. He helped raise funds for the Twelfth Street YMCA and was active in the Society of Sponsors, which helped problem youth. He was a member of Lincoln Memorial Congregational Church, where he headed a progressive Bible class.

Taylor died at his home at the age of 63 on August 8, 1953. He was buried in Lincoln Memorial Cemetery, with Masonic honors. During the 1959 Phi Beta Sigma conclave in Washington, D.C., the fraternity members made a pilgrimage to Taylor's grave in Lincoln Memorial Cemetery.
