= Phi Beta Sigma =

International historically Black American collegiate fraternity

- ΦΒΣ
- Founded: January 9, 1914; 112 years ago Howard University
- Type: Social
- Affiliation: NPHC
- Former affiliation: NIC
- Status: Active
- Emphasis: African Americans
- Scope: International
- Motto: "Culture For Service and Service For Humanity"
- Pillars: Brotherhood, Scholarship, and Service
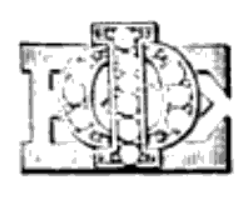
- Member badge
- Colors: Royal blue and Pure white
- Symbol: Crescent
- Flower: White Carnation
- Mascot: Dove
- Publication: The Crescent
- Chapters: 599
- Members: 225,000+ lifetime
- Nicknames: Sigmas
- Headquarters: 145 Kennedy Street, NW; Washington, D.C. United States
- Website: www.phibetasigma1914.org

Phi Beta Sigma Fraternity, Inc. (ΦΒΣ) is a historically African American fraternity. It was founded at Howard University in Washington, D.C., in 1914. The fraternity's founders, A. Langston Taylor, Leonard F. Morse, and Charles I. Brown, wanted to organize a Greek letter fraternity that would exemplify the ideals of Brotherhood, Scholarship and Service while taking an inclusive perspective to serve the community as opposed to having an exclusive purpose. The Fraternity was built on the principles of brotherhood, Scholarship, and Service, to create an organization that would serve both college campuses and surrounding communities. The fraternity exceeded the prevailing models of Black Greek-Letter fraternal organizations by being the first to establish alumni chapters, youth mentoring clubs, a federal credit union, chapters in Africa, and a collegiate chapter outside of the United States. It is the only fraternity to hold a constitutional bond with a historically African-American sorority, Zeta Phi Beta, which was founded on January 16, 1920, at Howard University in Washington, D.C., through the efforts of members of Phi Beta Sigma.

The fraternity expanded over a broad geographical area in a short amount of time when its second, third, and fourth chapters were chartered at Wiley College in Texas and Morgan State College in Maryland in 1916, and Kansas State University in 1917. Today, the fraternity serves through a membership of more than 200,000 men in over 700 chapters in the United States, Africa, Europe, Asia, and the Caribbean. Although Phi Beta Sigma is considered a predominantly African-American fraternity, its membership includes college-educated men of African, Caucasian, Hispanic, Native American, and Asian descent. According to its Constitution, academically eligible male students of any race, religion, or national origin may join while enrolled at a college or university through collegiate chapters, or professional men may join through an alumni chapter if a college degree has been attained, along with a certain minimum number of earned credit hours.

Phi Beta Sigma is a member of the National Pan-Hellenic Council (NPHC) and a former member of the North American Interfraternity Conference (NIC). The current International President is David A. Turner, and the fraternity's headquarters are located at 145 Kennedy Street, NW, Washington, D.C.

== History ==
=== Founding (1910–1916) ===
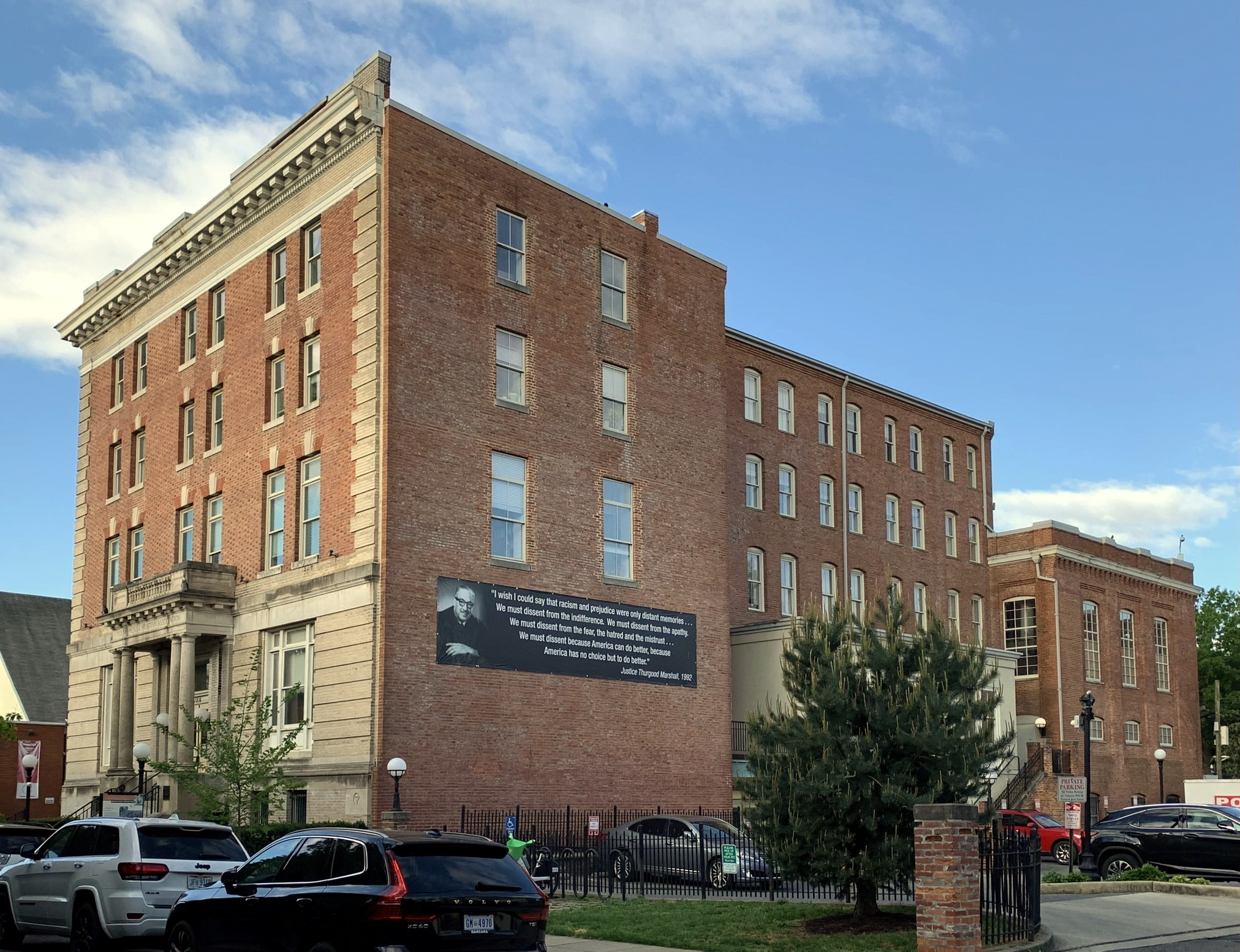
The birthplace of Sigma, the Twelfth Street YMCA Building in Washington, D.C.

In the summer of 1910, after a conversation with a recent Howard University graduate in Memphis, Tennessee, A. Langston Taylor thought to establish a fraternity. Soon after, he started as a student at Howard University in Washington, D.C. In October 1913, Taylor and Leonard F. Morse had their initial conversation about starting a fraternity. They included Charles I. Brown as the third member of the founding group. By November 1913, they established a committee to develop what was to become Phi Beta Sigma Fraternity. Soon after the first committee meeting, Taylor, Morse, and Brown chose nine associates to join in creating the fraternity. Those men were the first charter members of the organization.

On January 9, 1914, the permanent organization of Phi Beta Sigma fraternity was established in the Bowen Room of the 12th Street Y.M.C.A Building in Washington, D.C. On April 15, 1914, the Board of Deans at Howard University officially recognized Phi Beta Sigma, and the following week, The University Reporter, Howard University's student newspaper, publicized it.

During the first two years, the fraternity organized and maintained a Sunday school program, led by A.H. Brown, and opened a public library and art gallery, which became the foundations of the Benjamin Banneker Research Society and the Washington Art Club, respectively. Abraham M. Walker, a fraternity member, was elected associate editor of the Howard University Journal. The following year, Walker and founder A. Langston Taylor were elected Editor-in-Chief and circulation manager, respectively. Other fraternity members also advanced to leadership positions at Howard: W.F. Vincent, William H. Foster, John Berry, Earl Lawson, among others, were presidents of the Debating Society, the college YMCA, the Political Science Club, and the Athletic Association, respectively. On the athletic field, Captain John Camper and J. House Franklin were standout football players for Howard University.

In the spring of 1915, the fraternity worked to emphasize its intellectual reach. It inducted such African-American scholars as Dr. Edward P. Davis, Dr. Thomas W. Turner, T.M. Gregory, and Dr. Alain Leroy Locke. On March 5, 1915, Herbert L. Stevens was initiated as the first Graduate member of Phi Beta Sigma.

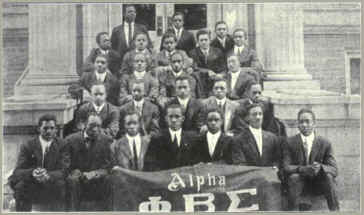
Alpha chapter at Howard University, circa 1914

A year after the establishment of Phi Beta Sigma, it began expanding to other campuses. On November 13, 1915, Beta chapter was chartered at Wiley College in Marshall, Texas by graduate member Herbert Stevens. Beta became the first chapter of any African-American Greek-lettered organization to be chartered south of Richmond, Virginia. As Phi Beta Sigma continued its expansion in the Eastern and Southern United States, other national fraternities were beginning to take notice.

On December 28, 1916, Phi Beta Sigma hosted the fraternity's first conclave in Washington, D.C. Some 200 members attended, representing three collegiate chapters, Alpha, Beta, and Gamma (established at Morgan State College in Baltimore). The 1916 conclave authorized production of an official fraternity publication, and member W.F. Vincent was elected as the National Editor.

=== World War I and the Sigma call to arms (1917–1919) ===
Phi Beta Sigma responded to a "call to arms" in 1917 as the United States entered the First World War. Alpha chapter had about seventy members in uniform. During the war, many members entered the service or war work. Many fraternity chapters were depleted, and the National Office ceased to function. As a result of deaths and other dislocations resulting from the war, the General Board was forced to reorganize. Fraternity President I. L. Scruggs asked founder and National Treasurer A. Langston Taylor to contact members as soon as they appeared in civilian clothes. Taylor helped revive the fraternity by appealing to members in the US, as numerous Sigma men were serving on the European front.

=== Incorporation and the founding of Zeta Phi Beta (1920–1933) ===
By February 1920, Phi Beta Sigma had expanded to ten active chapters. During the December 1919 Conclave, Phi Beta Sigma's first conclave after the war, A. Langston Taylor was given approval from the General Board to assist in the organization of what was to become Phi Beta Sigma's sister sorority.

In the spring of 1919, Sigma member Charles Robert Samuel Taylor, a student at Howard University, discussed with fellow student Arizona Cleaver his idea for a sister organization to be established. Cleaver presented this idea to fourteen other Howard women. With the help of Charles Taylor and A. Langston Taylor, they began work to found the new sorority.

With administration permission, Zeta Phi Beta sorority held its first official meeting on January 16, 1920. The founders and charter members of the Sorority were Arizona Cleaver (Stemons), Viola Tyler (Goings), Myrtle Tyler (Faithful), Pearl Anna Neal, and Fannie Pettie (Watts). The five founders chose the name Zeta Phi Beta. The similar names of both Sigma and Zeta are intentional, as the women adopted the Greek letters 'Phi' and 'Beta' to "seal and signify the relationship between the two organizations".

"Arizona Cleaver was the chief builder, and she asked fourteen others to join her. I shall never forget the first meetings held in the dormitory rooms of Miner Hall. Miss Hardwick, the matron, never knew I was about until I was escorted out by Arizona, who was her assistant. I was Miss Hardwick's favorite boy."

— Sigma Brother Charles R. Taylor
(On Arizona Cleaver & the organization of Zeta Phi Beta)

The newly established Zeta Phi Beta Sorority, Inc. was given a formal introduction at the Whitelaw Hotel by their Sigma counterparts, Charles R. and A. Langston Taylor. As National Executive Secretary of Phi Beta Sigma, Charles Taylor wrote to all Sigma chapters requesting they establish Zeta chapters at their respective institutions. With the efforts of Taylor, Zeta added several chapters in areas as far west as Kansas City State College; as far south as Morris Brown College in Atlanta, Georgia; and as far north as New York City.

==== Phi Beta Sigma's contributions to the Harlem Renaissance ====
The 1920s also witnessed the birth of the Harlem Renaissance - a flowering of African-American cultural and intellectual life that began to be absorbed into mainstream American culture. Phi Beta Sigma fraternity brother Alain LeRoy Locke is unofficially credited as the "Father of the Harlem Renaissance." His philosophy served as a strong motivating force in keeping the energy and passion of the Movement at the forefront. In addition to Locke, Sigma brothers James Weldon Johnson and A. Philip Randolph were participants in this creative emergence, led primarily by the African-American community based in the neighborhood of Harlem in New York City.

On January 31, 1920, Phi Beta Sigma was incorporated in the District of Washington, D.C.

In November 1921, the first volume of the Phi Beta Sigma Journal was published. The journal was the official organ of the fraternity; Eugene T. Alexander was named its first editor. The following month, the fraternity held its 1921 Conclave at Morris Brown College in Atlanta, Georgia. This conference saw the first-ever inter-fraternity conference between Phi Beta Sigma and Omega Psi Phi. This would lead to the first inter-fraternity council meeting between the two organizations the following spring in Washington, D.C.

"When Taylor left the center of the stage, the main theme of the plot had been introduced. It would, of course, be developed, embellished, and varied in the years to come."

— Brother I.L. Scruggs

In 1922, Founder Taylor called for the assembly of the Black Greek-letter organizations at Howard University to discuss the formation of a governing council. Although Taylor’s efforts failed on that particular day, they would later be understood as part of the broader movement initiated by Alpha Kappa Alpha sorority through its 1921 invitation to all Black Greek-letter organizations—an effort that culminated eight years later in the formation of the National Pan-Hellenic Council.

In March 1924, the name of the fraternity's official publication, The Phi Beta Sigma Journal, was changed to The Crescent Magazine. The magazine's name change was suggested by members of the Mu chapter at Lincoln University to reference the symbolic meaning of the crescent to the fraternity. At the 1924 conclave, a special exhibit introduced the concept of the "Bigger and Better Negro Business". This would lead to the establishment of Bigger and Better Business as a national program at the 1925 Conclave. At the 1928 Conclave, held in Louisville, Kentucky, the tradition of branding the skin with a hot iron was officially sanctioned by the fraternity as part of its initiation process.

==== Sigma and the Great Depression ====
At the 1929 Conclave held in New York City, Carter G. Woodson was invited as a guest speaker and saw the creation of the Distinguished Service Chapter. The fall of 1929 saw the crash of the nation's stock markets. Like many other organizations during this period, Phi Beta Sigma faced financial difficulties. With brothers facing financial worries, some members were forced to leave their respective institutions due to a lack of funds to continue their education; several chapters became inactive. The fraternity saw its income drastically shrink to the point of nearly disappearing completely. As a result of the bank closures, the remaining funds of the fraternity were frozen.

"Negroes would warrant and get Support and Patronage from other races as well as the Negro race"

— Arthur W. Mitchell
6th International President of ΦΒΣ

As the nation came to terms with the Great Depression, Phi Beta Sigma and its members continued to implement programs to support the black community. In February 1930, the General Board met in New York City and appointed the vice president of the Eastern Region, Dr. T. H. Wright, as head of the new Bigger and Better Business program. The first objective of Phi Beta Sigma's new program was to call upon colleges to provide business courses for its students. The fraternity went forward with its plans to implement the Bigger and Better Business program and aid as many financially strapped chapters as possible through scholarships for brothers.

Later that year, at the 1930 Conclave held in Tuskegee, Alabama, northern region vice president C. L. Roberts suggested that instead of a yearly meeting, the annual conclaves should be held once every two years. It was also at this conclave that brother George Washington Carver delivered an impassioned and emotional speech to the brothers in attendance.

=== Social action and international expansion (1934–1949) ===
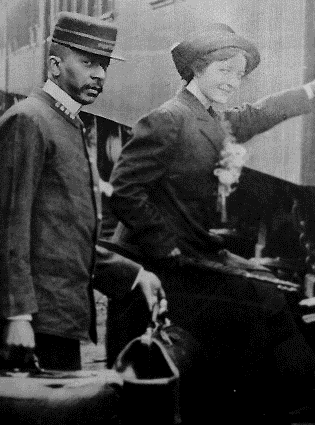
A porter for the Pullman Company; under the leadership of Sigma Brother A. Philip Randolph, the Brotherhood of Sleeping Car Porters gained rights under federal law.

Fraternity brother A. Philip Randolph, who organized the Brotherhood of Sleeping Car Porters, played a role in the amendments to the Railway Labor Act in 1934. As a result, railway porters were granted rights under federal law. This victory and the continuing work of Randolph and the BSCP led to the Pullman Company contract with the union, which included over $2 million in pay increases for employees, a shorter workweek, and overtime pay. 1934 also marked the birth of Social Action as a national program and the return of founder A. Langston Taylor to the forefront of Sigma. Brother Emmett May was elected as the first director of the social action initiative.

The 1935 Atlanta Conclave saw yet another meeting between Sigma and Omega Psi Phi fraternities. Omega founders Edgar Amos Love and Oscar James Cooper brought greetings to the brothers in attendance at the conference on behalf of the members of Omega Psi Phi. The following year, the general board approved the fraternity's affiliation with the already established National Pan-Hellenic Council. In continuation of Sigma's Social Action initiative, brothers of Sigma were actively involved in the Chicago meeting of the National Negro Congress.

We live in daily hope that we shall one day learn the fate of our beloved brother and founder.

— Founder Leonard F. Morse – 1949
(On The fate of Founder Charles I. Brown)

As Phi Beta Sigma prepared for the Silver (25th) Anniversary, a special search was made for lost founder Charles I. Brown. The search would yield no results as to the fate or location of Founder Brown. The 1939 conclave marking the 25th anniversary of the fraternity was held on the campus of Howard University.

At the 1941 Conclave in Philadelphia, Pennsylvania, the fraternity became a permanent member of the National Negro Business League. At the same conclave, Brother A. Philip Randolph announced a proposed march on Washington, D.C., to protest racial discrimination in defense work and the armed forces. This proposed march would lead then president of the United States Franklin D. Roosevelt to create the Committee on Fair Employment Practice and issue Executive Order 8802, which barred discrimination in governmental and defense industry hiring.

Due to the outbreak of the Second World War, no Conclaves were held, although some brothers in various regions were able to assemble independently of the General Board. At the fraternity's first spring conclave in 1944, the fraternity voted to support the United Negro College Fund. 1949 would mark the reunion of two of the founders of Sigma: A. Langston Taylor and Leonard F. Morse.

The 1940s and 1950s would show the continued expansion of Phi Beta Sigma. In 1949, the fraternity became an international organization with the chartering of the Beta Upsilon Sigma graduate chapter in Monrovia, Liberia. The fraternity would extend its international chapters into Geneva, Switzerland, with the chartering of the Gamma Nu Sigma graduate chapter in 1955.

=== Sigma and the Civil Rights Movement (1950–1969) ===
As the struggle for the civil rights of African Americans renewed in the 1950s, Sigma men held positions of leadership among various civil rights groups, organized protests, and proposed the March on Washington of 1963. In Atlanta, A. Philip Randolph helped with the establishment of the Southern Christian Leadership Conference (SCLC) in 1957. Randolph and fraternity brother John Lewis would later be involved with the 1963 March on Washington, Randolph as a key organizer and Lewis as a speaker representing the Student Nonviolent Coordinating Committee (SNCC).

In 1961, Phi Beta Sigma brother James Forman joined and became the executive secretary of the then newly formed Student Nonviolent Coordinating Committee. From 1961 to 1965, Forman, a decade older and more experienced than most of the other members of SNCC, became responsible for providing organizational support to the young, loosely affiliated activists by paying bills, radically expanding the institutional staff, and planning the logistics for programs. Under the leadership of Forman and others, SNCC became an important political player at the height of the Civil Rights Movement.

During the Selma to Montgomery marches, Brothers Hosea Williams and John Lewis, and Albert Turner, Sr. led a 54-mile protest march from Selma to the capital of Alabama: Montgomery. Lewis became known nationally for his prominent role in the marches and became a Congressman as a Democrat from Georgia. During police attacks on the peaceful demonstration, Lewis was beaten mercilessly, leaving head wounds that are still visible today.

Phi Beta Sigma brothers Huey P. Newton & Bobby Seale established the revolutionary left-wing Black Panther Party. Originally, the Black Panther Party for Self-Defense's goal was the protection of African-American neighborhoods from police brutality in the interest of African-American justice. As one of the many advocates of The Black Power Movement, the Black Panthers were considered part of one of the most significant social, political, and cultural movements in U.S. history. "The Movement['s] provocative rhetoric, militant posture, and cultural and political flourishes permanently altered the contours of American Identity."

=== History (1970–2000) ===
In 1970, brother Melvin Evans was elected the first governor of the United States Virgin Islands. In 1979, Phi Beta Sigma celebrated its 65th anniversary Conclave in Washington, D.C. In 1983, Sigma brother Harold Washington became the first African-American mayor of the city of Chicago, Illinois. In 1986, the fraternity opened the Phi Beta Sigma Federal Credit Union, which is open to fraternity members, members of the sister sorority, Zeta Phi Beta, their families, and their respective Regions and chapters.

In 1986, a brother of Phi Beta Sigma, Baltazar Mendoza-Madrigal, alongside 17 other men, established Sigma Lambda Beta at the University of Iowa. Mendoza-Madrigal was inspired by the significant contributions of his fraternity to the African American community and recognized a similar need within the Latino community. With permission granted by the national board of Phi Beta Sigma, he was able to maintain his membership while establishing a new organization that aimed to serve and unify the Latino community.

In 1989, the fraternity celebrated its Diamond Jubilee (75th anniversary) in Washington, D.C. Also in that year, brother Edison O. Jackson became the president of Medgar Evers College in Brooklyn, New York.

In 1990, two Sigma brothers made significant firsts in their respective fields as Brothers Charles E. Freeman and Morris Overstreet were elected the first district judge of the Illinois Supreme Court and the first African American elected by popular vote to a statewide office in the state of Texas, respectively. Later that year, following the establishment of Sigma Lambda Gamma at the University of Iowa, which was aided by members of Sigma Lambda Beta, those organizations, along with Phi Beta Sigma and Zeta Phi Beta, formed the unofficial First Inter-Racially Mixed (F.I.R.M.) Family network. This network embodies a shared commitment to unity and mutual support across these diverse Greek organizations, although it did not create any new constitutional bounds that weren't already present.

In 1995, the fraternity was involved with the planning and support of the Million Man March, with brother Benjamin Chavis Muhammad serving as the national coordinator of the March. The fraternity's national headquarters doubled as the headquarters of the march.

=== 21st century ===
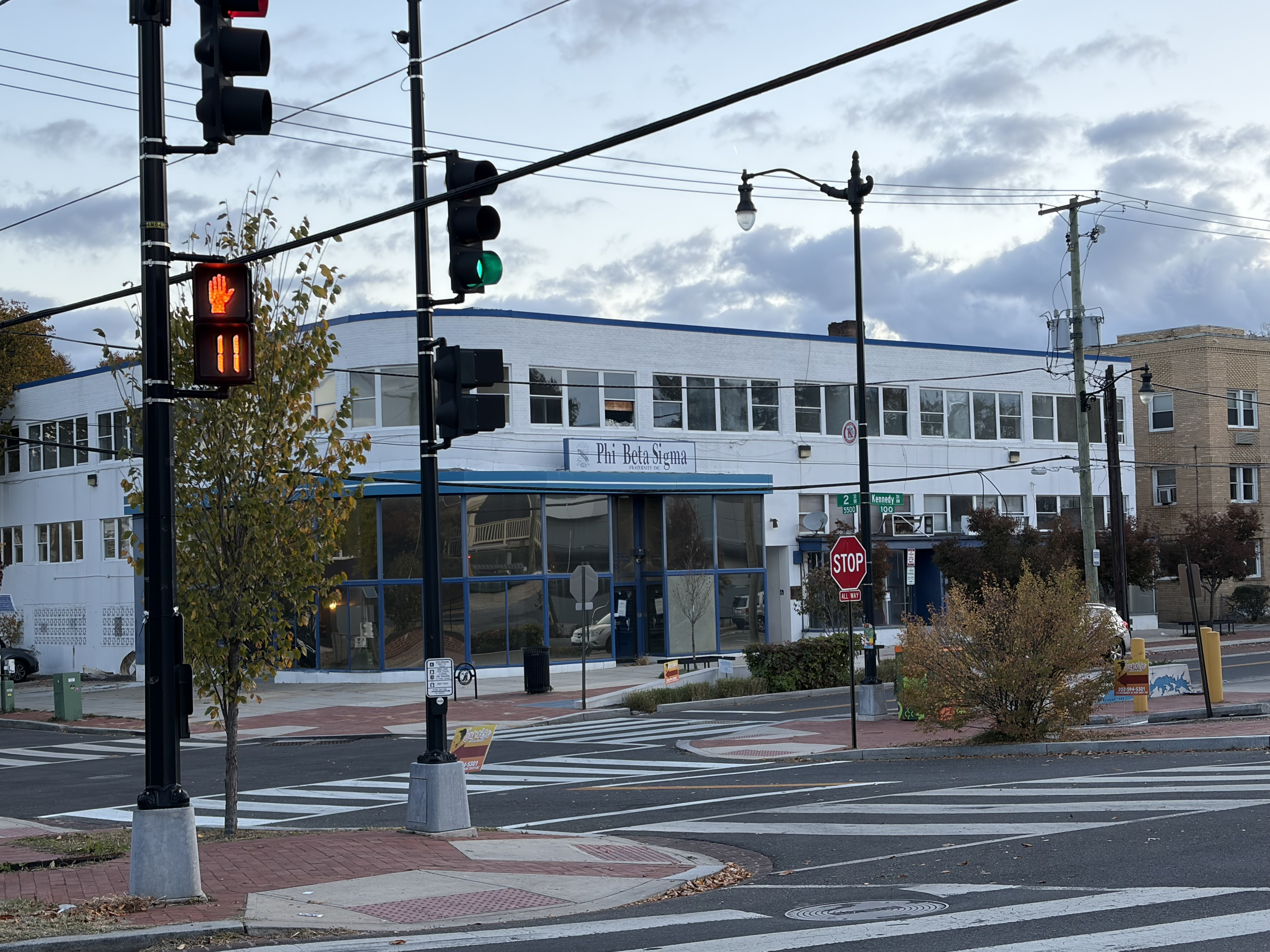
The headquarters of the Phi Beta Sigma fraternity in Manor Park, Washington, D.C.

At the 2003 conclave, in Memphis, Tennessee, the fraternity added Projects S.W.W.A.C & S.A.T.A.P. as its national programs to combat cancer and teenage pregnancy. In addition to those projects, the fraternity added Project Vote and the Phi Beta Sigma Capital Hill Summit under the social action umbrella. In 2015, the fraternity's headquarters was also the headquarters of the 20th Anniversary of the Million Man March. At the 2007 Conclave in Charlotte, North Carolina the fraternity introduced the Sigma Wellness initiatives as the latest national programs. The 2009 Conclave in New Orleans, Louisiana saw former U.S. President William Jefferson Clinton accept honorary membership to Phi Beta Sigma Fraternity."

For over 80 years, the fate of lost founder Charles I. Brown remained a mystery, with his last correspondence being a 1924 letter to founder A. Langston Taylor, where he indicated that he was teaching in Topeka, Kansas. Beginning in 1999, a task force spearheaded by International Historian Mark Pacich was organized to finally determine his whereabouts. In 2015, a breakthrough was made, and Founder Brown was finally discovered at his final resting place at Holy Cross Cemetery in Yeadon, Pennsylvania. Researchers determined that he lived and served his final years in a Catholic parish in Philadelphia. Subsequently, a three-day celebration was held in Philadelphia in January 2017 by members of the fraternity, where Founder Brown's headstone was unveiled.

The fraternity noticed abuse of its trademark by the clothing designer Ralph Lauren in early January 2020. That designer incorporated the Fraternity's name along with other symbolism on the fabric of pants offered for sale on its website. The Fraternity objected and explained in a cease-and-desist letter that such usage was in violation of trademark law and was not developed as fraternity-approved sportswear. Black Enterprise Magazine profiled this controversy in a January 2020 article.

== Symbols ==
The motto of Phi Beta Sigma is "Culture For Service and Service For Humanity". The fraternity's badge is a monogram of the Greek letters "ΦΒΣ"; the "Φ" is outlined with twelve pears. Its colors are royal blue and pure white. Its flower is the white carnation. Its mascot is the dove. Its symbol is the crescent. The fraternity's publication is The Crescent. Its nickname is Sigma.

== Membership ==
Phi Beta Sigma's Constitution states that race, religion, and national origin are not criteria for membership. Membership is predominantly African-American in composition, with members in over 700 collegiate and alumni chapters in the United States, the District of Columbia, Germany, Switzerland, the Bahamas, the Virgin Islands, South Korea, Japan, and countries in Africa. As of 2025, more than 225,000+ men have joined the membership of Phi Beta Sigma.

== Chapters and regions ==
The seven regions of Phi Beta Sigma Fraternity both within the U.S. and internationally.

As of 2025, the fraternity had 599 active chapters.

Phi Beta Sigma Fraternity organizes its chapters according to their regions in the United States and abroad. The seven regions are each led by a regional director and a regional board. A comprehensive list of regions is shown below:

- Eastern (Connecticut, Delaware, District of Columbia, Maine, Maryland, Massachusetts, New Hampshire, New Jersey, New York, Pennsylvania, Rhode Island, Vermont, Virginia, West Virginia, the United States Virgin Islands, the Bahamas, Africa, and Europe)
- Great Lakes (Ohio, Indiana, Kentucky, Minnesota, Illinois, Michigan, Wisconsin, Iowa, Ontario (Canada))
- Gulf Coast (Louisiana, New Mexico, and Texas)
- Southeastern (North Carolina, South Carolina, and all of Tennessee east of the 86th Longitude)
- Southern (Mississippi, Alabama, Georgia, Florida, and the Bahamas, )
- Southwestern (Arkansas, Kansas, Missouri, Nebraska, Oklahoma, and all of Tennessee west of the 86th Longitude)
- Western (Alaska, Arizona, California, Colorado, Hawaii, Idaho, Montana, Nevada, North Dakota, Oregon, South Dakota, Utah, Washington, Wyoming, Japan, South Korea, and Kuwait)

A chapter name ending in "Sigma" denotes a graduate chapter. No chapter of Phi Beta Sigma is designated Omega, the last letter of the Greek alphabet, and deceased brothers are referred to as having joined the Omega chapter.

== Activities ==
Phi Beta Sigma National Programs
Bigger and Better Business	Project Vote
Project S.E.E.D.	Phi Beta Sigma Capitol Hill Summit
National Program of Education	Project S.A.T.A.P.P.
Project S.E.T.	Sigma Wellness Project
Project S.W.W.A.C.	The Sigma Beta Club
Clean Speech Movement	Sigma Academy
Sleepout For The Homeless	HIV/AIDS Awareness
Project S.A.D.A.	Project S.A.S
Project S.E.R.	Phi Beta Sigma National Marrow Donor Program
Sigma I.D. Day	Phi Beta Sigma – "A Fraternity that Reads"
Phi Beta Sigma – "Buying Black and Giving Back"

Phi Beta Sigma aims their focuses on issues that greatly impact the African-American community and the youth of the nation. The Phi Beta Sigma national programs of Bigger and Better Business, Education, and Social Action are realized through the Fraternity's overarching program, Sigma Wellness, adopted in 2007.

=== Bigger and Better Business ===
As told by Dr. I. L. Scruggs (excerpts from Our Cause Speeds On):

"Philadelphia, 1924, Phi Beta Sigma Fraternity 'arrived'. We had a mob of people at this Conclave. There were representatives from twenty-eight chapters -and all the trimmings. The introduction of the Bigger and Better Negro Business idea was made by way of an exhibit devoted to this topic.

The Bigger and Better Negro Business idea was first tested in 1924 with an imposing exhibition in Philadelphia. This was held in connection with the Conclave. Twenty-five leading Negro Businesses sent statements and over fifty sent exhibits. The whole show took place in the lobby of the YMCA. Several thousand visitors seemed to have been impressed. The response was so great that the 1925 Conclave in Richmond, Virginia voted unanimously to make Bigger and Better Negro Business the public program of the Fraternity, and it has been so ever since."

Phi Beta Sigma believes that the improvement in the economic conditions of minorities is a major factor in the improvement of the general welfare of society. It is upon this conviction that the Bigger and Better Business Program rests. Since 1926, the Bigger and Better Business Program has been sponsored on a national scale by Phi Beta Sigma as a way of supporting, fostering, and promoting minority owned businesses and services.

The Bigger and Better Business serves as an umbrella for other national initiatives involving business. The program's goals include supporting minority businesses, increasing communication with Sigma Brothers involved in business, and instilling sound business principles and practices to members of the community. Project S.E.E.D. (Sigma Economic Empowerment Development) It is the foremost Bigger and Better Business Program. The program was developed to help the membership focus on two important areas: Financial Management and Homeownership.

=== Education ===
The founders of Phi Beta Sigma were all educators in their own right. The genesis of the Education Program lies in the traditional emphasis that the fraternity places on Education. During the 1945 conclave in St. Louis, Missouri, the fraternity underwent a constitution restructuring, which led to the birth of education as a National Program.

The National Program of Education focuses on programming and services for graduates and undergraduates in the fraternity. Programs such as scholarships, lectures, college fairs, mentoring, and tutoring enhance this program on local, regional, and national levels.

Project S.E.T. (Sigma Education Time) is focused on increasing grade point averages and graduation rates of college students throughout the nation. The program aims to help with job readiness, choosing a career path {3–5 year outlook}, interviewing techniques, negotiating, and entrepreneurship.

The Sigma Beta Club provides mentoring, guidance, educational tutorial assistance, and advice to young men between the ages of 6 and 18. Created in 1950, it was the first youth auxiliary group of any of the National Pan-Hellenic Council organizations; it also helps keep young boys off the streets and out of gangs.

=== Social action ===
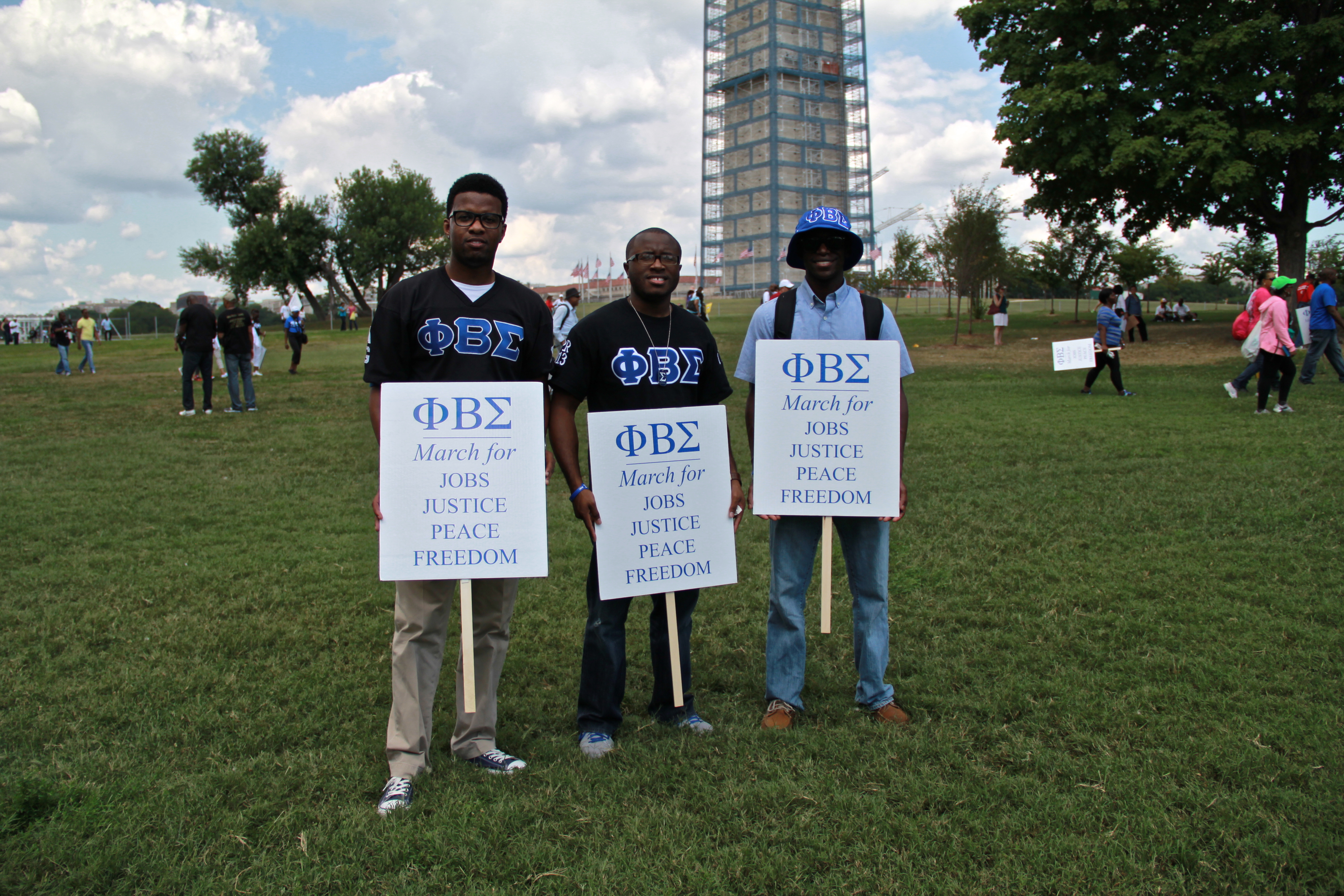
Phi Beta Sigma at the 50th Anniversary of the March on Washington for Jobs and Freedom

Phi Beta Sigma has, from its very beginning, concerned itself with improving the general well-being of minority groups. In 1934, a well-defined program of Social Action was formulated and put into action. Elmo M. Anderson, then president of the Epsilon Sigma chapter (New York), formulated this program calling for the reconstruction of social order.

In the winter of 1934, Sigma brothers Elmo Anderson, James W. Johnson, Emmett May, and Bob Jiggets presented the Social Action proposition to the Conclave in Washington, D.C. The idea was adopted as a national program at the same conclave. Anderson is credited as "The Father of Social Action".

The fraternity's five main social action programs are Project Vote, Sigma Wellness, Sigma Presence on Capitol Hill, and projects S.W.W.A.C. and S.A.T.A.P.P.

Project S.W.W.A.C. (Sigmas Waging War Against Cancer) is a concentrated and coordinated effort to reduce the incidence of cancer in the African-American community. Through a partnership with the American Cancer Society, the goal of Project S.W.W.A.C. is to increase awareness, with a strong emphasis on early detection and prevention of prostate and colorectal cancer. Project S.A.T.A.P.P. is a collaborative venture with the March of Dimes Birth Defects Foundation to address the alarming rise in teenage pregnancy. The Sigma Wellness Project is focused on living healthier lifestyles through education. The goal of Project Vote is to register and educate citizens and encourage members of the community to participate in the democratic process. The Sigma Presence on Capitol Hill Program is focused on presenting Sigma members with the opportunity to discuss many of the critical issues facing our communities with members of the U.S. Congress.

=== Sigma Beta Club ===
In 1950, Phi Beta Sigma established the Sigma Beta Club, a youth auxiliary group that was under the direction of fraternity member Parlett L. Moore. On April 23, 1954, the first club chapter was organized in Montgomery, Alabama. It continues today as a service organization that works with elementary, middle, and high school students.

=== Phi Beta Sigma History Museum ===
The Sigma History Museum was a traveling exhibition created in 2001 by Sigma brothers Mark Pacich, Louis W. Lubin Jr., and Ahab El’Askeni. The museum's initial goal was to dispel the discrepancies in the Fraternity's history by collecting as many newspaper articles, Crescent Magazines, Conclave Journals, autographs, pictures, etc., as possible. With the help of many Sigma members, in addition to families and friends of Sigma brothers, some impressive artifacts of the history of the fraternity were discovered. Among those artifacts, pictures of Sigma Founder A. Langston Taylor; historical pictures from the 1914, 1915, and 1916 yearbooks at Howard University; original letters; Conclave banners; and interviews with Sigma Brother Decatur Morse, son of Sigma Founder Leonard F. Morse, Samuel Proctor Massie II, son of an Alpha chapter charter member, Samuel P. Massie, Robert L. Pollard II, son of Sigma brother Col. Robert L. Pollard who joined Sigma in 1919, and Dr. Gregory Tignor, son of Sigma brother Madison Tignor who also joined Sigma in 1919. The exhibit has been displayed in many cities, including Orlando, Philadelphia, Detroit, Memphis, and Las Vegas.

On July 16, 2014, as part of the fraternity's centennial celebration, a permanent museum was opened at the Phi Beta Sigma International Headquarters in Washington, D.C. As a result, Phi Beta Sigma became the first Historically Black Greek Lettered fraternity to open its museum.

The assets of the museum have grown since the initial display in 2000. The most coveted possession yet to be acquired is the first 2 issues of the Phi Beta Sigma Journal. The museum is only 14 issues away from having every Crescent magazine ever printed.

=== Conclave ===
The Conclave is the legislative power of Phi Beta Sigma. During a conclave year, delegates representing all of the active chapters from within the seven regions of the fraternity meet in the chosen city. The Conclave-or fraternity convention- is currently held biannually and usually co-hosted by the alumni and collegiate chapters of the chosen city. During the convention, members of the General Board – the administrative body of the fraternity elected and appointed. The General Board may act in the interest of the fraternity when the Conclave is not in session. In addition, seminars, social events, concerts, an international Miss Phi Beta Sigma Pageant, Stepshow, and oratorical contests are also held during the week-long conference. Throughout the years, notable individuals such as George Washington Carver, Dr. Carter G. Woodson, and NFL quarterback Charlie Batch were speakers at past Conclaves.

The Current General Board is composed of the International President, First Vice-President, Second-Vice President, Treasurer, General Counsel, a Distinguished Service Chapter Representative, the regional directors, the immediate past-president, two collegiate members at large, and the director of collegiate affairs. The offices of Second-Vice President and collegiate member at large are reserved positions on the general board for collegiate (undergraduate) members to hold. In addition, the Editor of The Crescent Magazine, the Director of Publicity, and the National Executive Director make up the members of the General Board. The latter-mentioned members are appointed to their positions and do not hold voting powers.

=== Distinguished Service Chapter members ===
Established at the 1929 Conclave, the Distinguished Service Chapter is the highest honor bestowed on a member of Phi Beta Sigma. Membership in the Distinguished Service Chapter must be recommended and approved by the awardee's chapter, region, and the general board of the fraternity before entry. One must meet the following criteria to be considered for this honor:

- Active in the fraternity for at least ten years
- Has distinguished himself in the fraternity and/or in his respective communities for extending exemplary service.

Brother Jesse W. Lewis was voted in as the DSC's first member (1929).

== Notable members ==
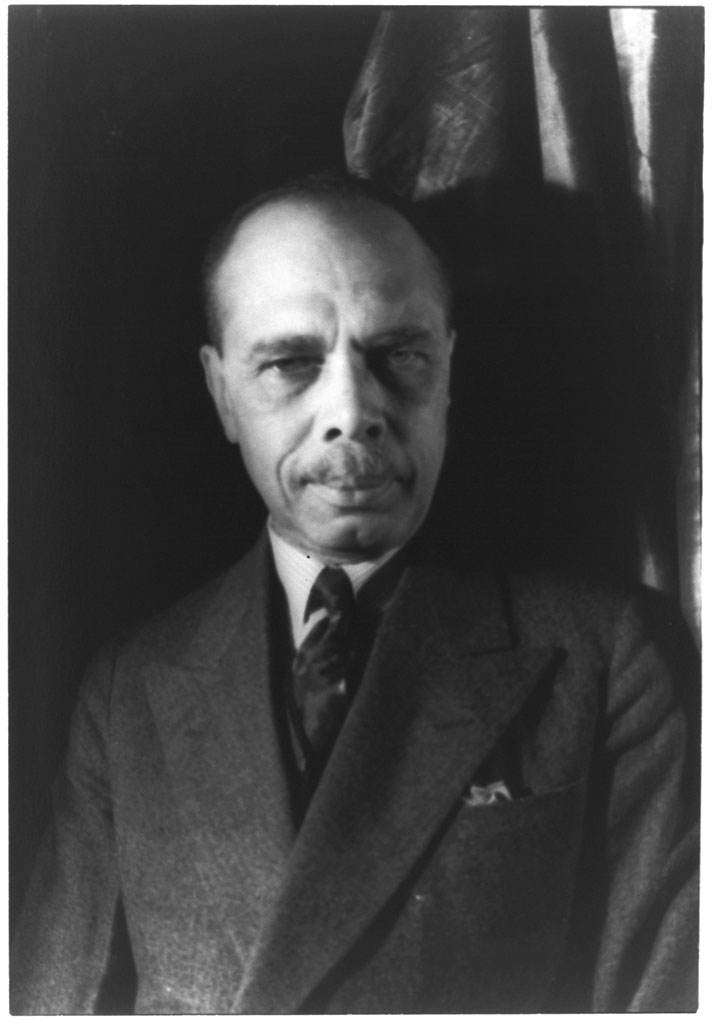
The literary works of Sigma Brother James Weldon Johnson, such as God's Trombones, played a significant role in the Harlem Renaissance.

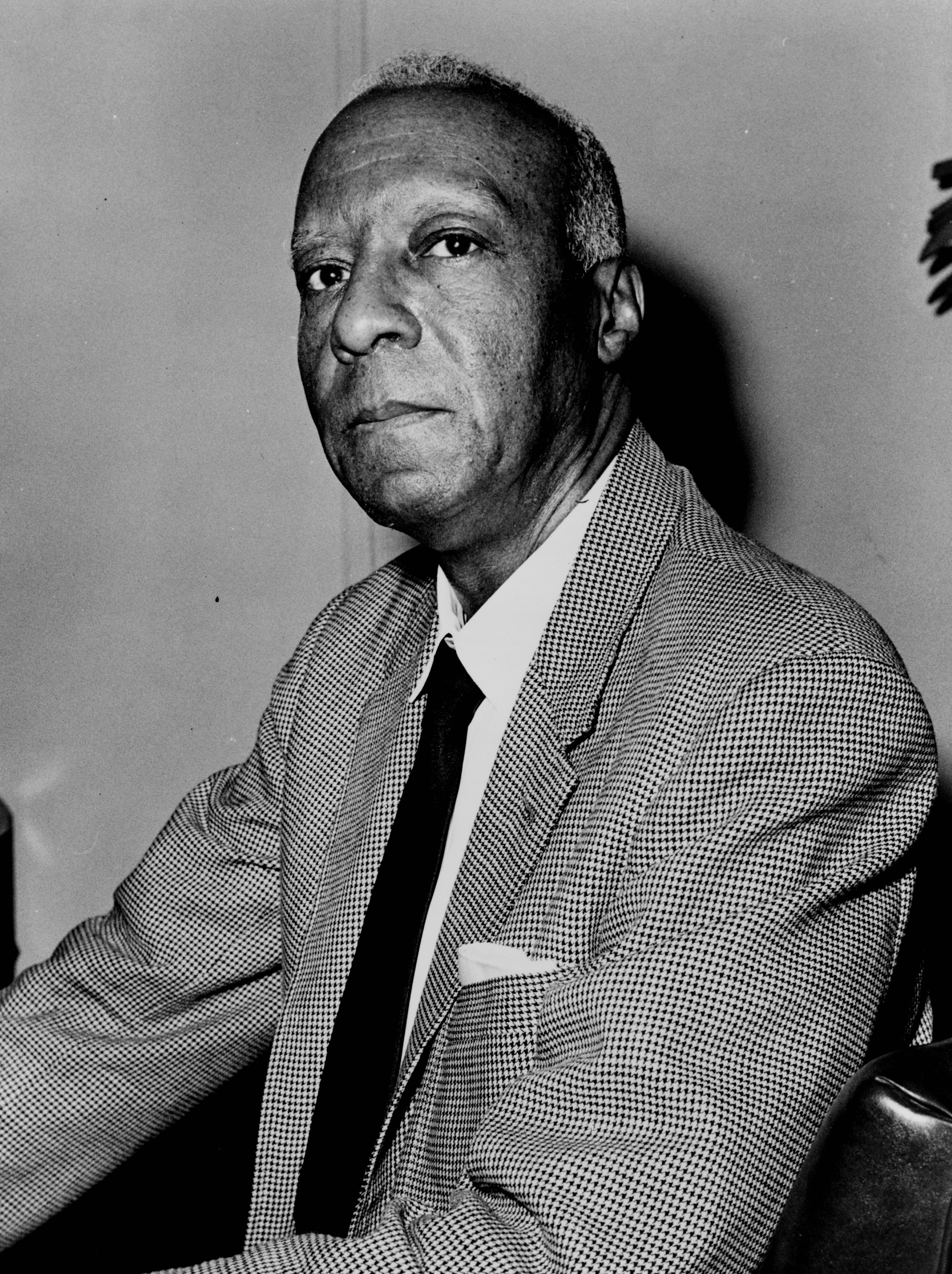
Sigma Brother A. Philip Randolph was seen as a key intellectual player during the Harlem Renaissance.

Phi Beta Sigma Fraternity's membership includes many notable members who have been involved in the fields of arts and entertainment, business, civil rights, education, health, law, politics, science, and sports.

The fraternity's membership roster includes heads of state Benjamin Nnamdi Azikiwe, Kwame Nkrumah, William Tolbert, and William V.S. Tubman, the past presidents of Nigeria, the Republic of Ghana, and Liberia, respectively. Also, the 42nd president of the United States, Bill Clinton, is an honorary member.

Other notable members include scientist George Washington Carver and the first black Rhodes Scholar, Alain LeRoy Locke. In addition, Black Panther Party founder Huey P. Newton; organizer of the Million Man March Benjamin Chavis Muhammad; civil rights activists John Lewis, Hosea Williams, and the Rev. Al Sharpton; and Member of the U.S. Congress Adriano Espaillat.

In entertainment and sports, included are musicians The Original Temptations; actors Blair Underwood, Ben Vereen, and Terrence Howard; television personality Al Roker; and professional athletes Jessie Small, Aaron Jones, Jerry Rice, Emmitt Smith, Hines Ward, Richard Sherman, and Ryan Howard.

== Member and local chapter misconduct ==
=== Pledging and hazing culture ===
Through the years, members of Phi Beta Sigma have been involved in incidents related to hazing, although now denounced by the fraternity, incidents have been discovered of pledges being subjected to activities which, in some cases, have resulted in serious injury and even death. Before 1990, the Crescent Club was the official pledge club of Phi Beta Sigma, and potential candidates interested in becoming a member of the fraternity would join the pledge club before being fully initiated. In response to the increasing number of lawsuits stemming from allegations and incidents related to hazing, Phi Beta Sigma and other members of the National Pan-Hellenic Council jointly agreed to disband pledging as a form of admission. In an attempt to eliminate Hazing from these organizations, each revised its orientation procedures and developed the Membership Intake Process.

In 2012, then Phi Beta Sigma International President Jimmy Hammock, along with the National Action Network, led by Sigma member Al Sharpton, launched a coalition whose aim was to combat hazing culture not just within the black Greek Lettered Organizations, but also the broader community at large. The coalition, also pledged their support of federal anti-hazing legislation that was being spearheaded by United States House of Representatives member Frederica Wilson. As part of the campaign, the fraternity developed anti-hazing training materials, held a town hall meetings, facilitated workshops and encouraged local chapters to participate in the annual National Anti-Hazing Awareness Day. Phi Beta Sigma's efforts to eliminate hazing from the fraternity continue as local chapters are now mandated to participate in anti-hazing awareness workshops.

Its notable hazing incidents include:

- In 1992, a pledge at Southern University (Baton Rouge) went blind after being intentionally hit on the head with a frying pan by a member of the fraternity.
- In 1996, the fraternity was sued by a former pledge and football player at the University of Georgia for violating hazing laws. As a pledge, he was hospitalized with bruises to his buttocks and torn blood vessels due to being paddled by fraternity members. Three members were arrested and pleaded guilty to hazing and battery charges.
- In 1998, a pledge at Southern Illinois University was struck in the chest by several members of the fraternity, which caused him to suffer from a severe asthma attack.
- In 2006, seven Sigmas were arrested for beating pledges from the University of South Carolina. One known pledge was hospitalized due to the severe beatings and torment.
- In 2009, Donnie Wade Jr., a student at Prairie View A&M University, died of extreme exhaustion due to illegal hazing activity while he was pledging the fraternity. His family filed a $97 million lawsuit against the fraternity, and the chapter was temporarily expelled from campus for several years.
- In 2012, seven members (six students and one staff member) of the fraternity were banned from the campus of Wiley College after reports surfaced of the brutal and dangerous hazing practices pledges had to go through.
- In 2012, a former pledge at Virginia State University sued the fraternity for $1 million as a result of his problematic experience with the fraternity. He was hospitalized due to constant physical abuse and forced to drop out of college due to emotional trauma that distracted him from completing his studies.
- In 2014, a former Francis Marion University student won a $1.6 million lawsuit against an individual member of the fraternity and his homeowner's policy after allegedly suffering acute kidney injury due to being severely beaten throughout his pledge process. Nine Phi Beta Sigma members were arrested.
- In 2015, the fraternity was kicked off the campus of Salisbury University until Spring 2017. The university had received several anonymous complaints of pledges being beaten with paddles, forced to drink alcohol, and being harassed.

=== Embezzlement ===
In 2011, Terry Davis, the former elected national treasurer for the fraternity, was convicted of embezzling at least $50,000 from the fraternity's bank accounts. He was sentenced to 31 months in prison and ordered to repay the fraternity $50,000 in restitution. Davis was initially charged with stealing over $200,000, but his attorney was able to lower the amount due to a lack of evidence.

Today, PBS continues to expand internationally, with its members serving in a variety of fields, including education, public service, business, athletics, and community advocacy. The fraternity states that it remains committed to its motto, Culture for Service and Service for Humanity, through programs and initiatives intended to serve communities.

== See also ==
- List of social fraternities
- List of Phi Beta Sigma chapters
- List of Phi Beta Sigma conclaves
