= Daniel Payne College =

Black college in Alabama, US (1889–1979)

Coordinates: 33.51671°N 86.79031°W

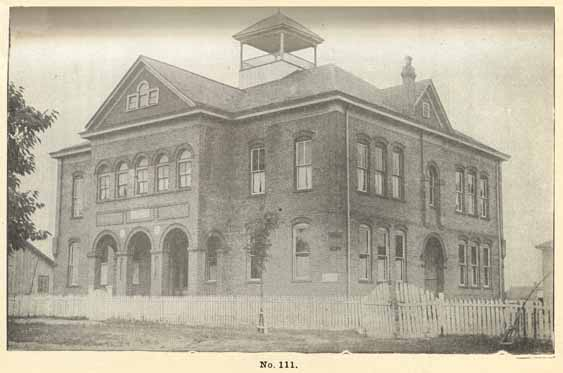
- Payne University (1906) in Selma Alabama
- Type: Private HBCU
- Active: 1889–1979
- Religious affiliation: African Methodist Episcopal Church
- Location: Birmingham, Alabama; United States

Daniel Payne College, also known as the Payne Institute, Payne University, and Greater Payne University, was a historically black college in Birmingham, Alabama from 1889 to 1979. It was associated with the African Methodist Episcopal Church (AME Church). The college was named in honor of Daniel Payne, the sixth bishop of the AME Church and the first black president of a college in the United States.

== History ==
The college was founded in Selma in 1889. Its campus was located at 1525 Franklin Street and included the Bishop Gaines Hall as the primary building, two additional classroom buildings and Coppin Hall which served as a dormitory. The college stayed at that location through 1922, when it relocated to its Woodlawn location within the city of Birmingham.

The college was located at 6415 Washington Boulevard. By 1974, the college had to be relocated because of airport expansion and the building of interstate highways in the area. The street on which the college was located no longer exists; however, a remnant of University Avenue that once led to the campus connects to the Messer Airport Highway.

The college moved to a new campus at the southeast corner of Cherry Avenue and Daniel Payne Drive on the far northern edge of Birmingham, where new buildings were constructed in 1974. On April 4, 1977, a destructive tornado tore through the campus, severely damaging buildings. The damage, along with mounting financial problems, forced the school to file for bankruptcy in 1978 and close its doors in 1979. At the time of its closure, the college had 120 students enrolled on the 153 acres (0.239 sq mi; 0.619 km^{2}) campus.

Later a group of students sued the former president, claiming that he had mismanaged college funds. A court ruling established the precedent that students have a vested interest in the operation of the college which they attend.

== Physical legacy ==
After the college closed, the city of Birmingham changed the name of Sayreton Road to Daniel Payne Drive in honor of the bishop and educator. The old campus still exists, although the dormitories have been abandoned. Other buildings were adapted for use as a public health clinic, and as the headquarters for the African Methodist Episcopal Church in Alabama. In 2009, the AME Church offices were relocated to downtown Birmingham.

In 2010 the AME Church announced plans to redevelop the campus as a retirement home and multi-use project. The former campus was severely damaged by the April 2011 tornado outbreak in Birmingham.
