= George Raymond Jr. =

American artist

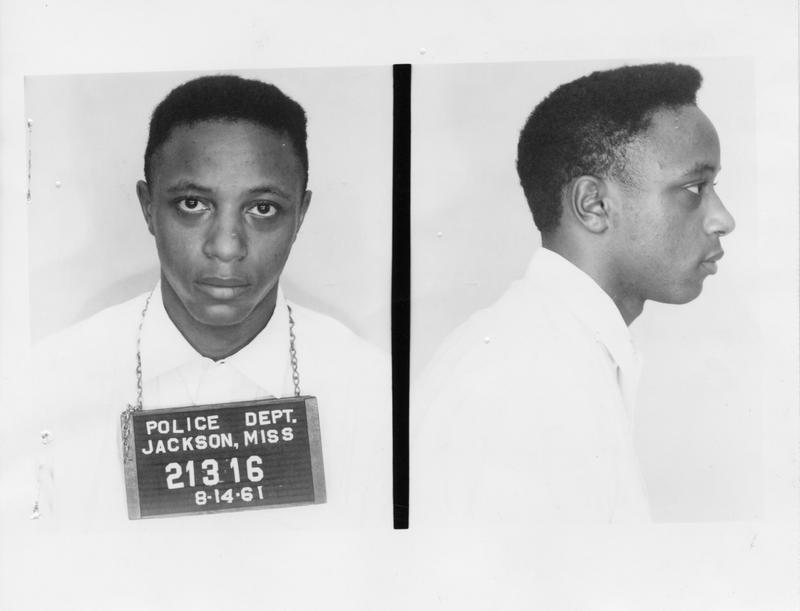
- Mugshot from Freedom Ride arrest in Jackson, Mississippi, on August 14, 1961
- Born: January 1, 1943; New Orleans, Louisiana, U.S.
- Died: March 8, 1973 (aged 30); New Orleans, Louisiana, U.S.
- Occupation: activist
- Spouse: Myrtis Evans (m. 1965)
- Children: Two

George Raymond Jr. (January 1, 1943 – March 8, 1973) was an African-American civil rights activist, a member of the Mississippi Freedom Democratic Party, a Freedom Rider, and head of the Congress of Racial Equality in Mississippi in the 1960s. Raymond influenced many of Mississippi's most known activists, such as Anne Moody, C. O. Chinn, and Annie Devine to join the movement and was influential in many of Mississippi's most notable Civil Rights activities such as a Woolworth's lunch counter sit-in and protests in Jackson, Mississippi, Meredith Mississippi March, and Freedom Summer. Raymond fought for voting rights and equality for African Americans within society amongst other things.

== Early life and family ==
George Raymond Jr. was born on January 1, 1943, in New Orleans, Louisiana. Friends and family describe him as courageous, action-oriented and vocal. He attended Tommy Lafon Elementary and Samuel J. Green Junior Elementary School, and graduated from Cohen High School in 1960. In 1965, Raymond married Myrtis Evans, whose mother, Laura Evans, was influenced by Raymond to become a Freedom Rider. The couple had two children.

== Civil rights movement ==
=== Freedom Rides ===
At the age of eighteen, Raymond was living in New Orleans, when he was arrested for his participation in the Freedom Rides. Raymond, along with Pauline K. Sims, was arrested in the Trailways bus terminal in Jackson, Mississippi, on August 14, 1961.

=== Activism ===
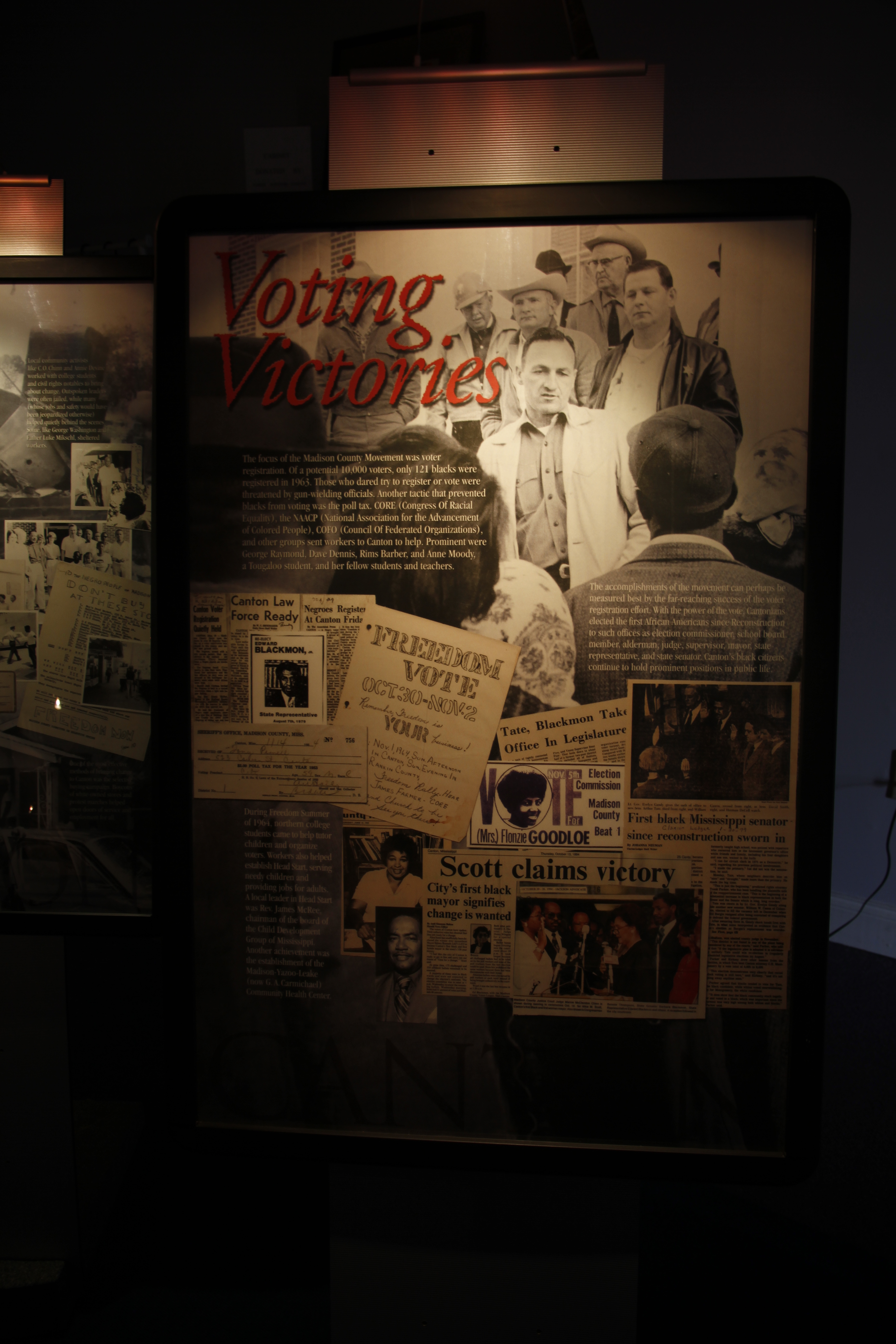
Poster in a Canton, Mississippi, museum

Raymond moved to Canton, Mississippi, through the Congress Of Racial Equality (CORE) in the early 1960s. CORE, the National Association for the Advancement of Colored People (NAACP), the Council of Federated Organizations (COFO), and other groups sent workers like Raymond to Canton to focus on voter registration. Of a potential 10,000 voters, in Madison County, only 121 blacks were registered in 1963. Those who dared try to register or vote were threatened by gun-wielding officials. Another tactic that prevented blacks from voting was the poll tax. Raymond, Dave Dennis, Robert Chinn, Anne Moody, a Tougaloo student, and many others led the voting registration initiative in Canton. George was the project director for the Freedom Summer in 1964 and remained in charge in the following years. In 1965 he extended CORE's activities into Rankin and Leake counties, among others.

=== Woolworth sit-in ===
On May 28, 1963, in coordination with Medgar Evers, George Raymond, Anne Moody, Pearlena Lewis, Prof. John R. Salter, and Walter Williams sat down at the downtown Jackson's Woolworth's "whites only" lunch counter in an attempt to integrate it. For two hours the demonstrators were beaten, sworn at, kicked, splattered with ketchup, and called communists and nigger-lovers. Only when the white mob began to empty shelves and hurl whatever they could touch at the demonstrators did the owner close the store down. Police Deputy Chief J. R. Ray watched and violence erupted. The Jackson sit-in was one in a series of nonviolent protests which led to the Woolworth's department store chain reversing its policy of racial segregation in the Southern United States. In her autobiography, Coming of Age in Mississippi, Annie Moody wrote a vivid account of this sit-in.

George appears in the only photograph of the lunch counter scene that day. In it, the camera's flash and his deep black skin provide a double shadow against Pearlena's bright summer suit. He sits stone-faced, staring straight ahead while a pint bottle of silky white cream is poured down the back of his muscular neck and onto his white T-shirt and crisp bib overalls – clothing that would become his trademark in the Mississippi movement.

=== Mississippi burning trial ===
The Mississippi burning trial involved the 1964 murders of Chaney, Goodman, and Schwerner, three political activists during the American Civil Rights Movement. The murders of James Chaney, a 21-year-old black man from Meridian, Mississippi; Andrew Goodman, a 20-year-old Jewish anthropology student from New York City; and Michael Schwerner, a 24-year-old Jewish CORE organizer and former social worker also from New York, symbolized the risks of participating in the Civil Rights Movement in the South during what became known as "Freedom Summer", dedicated to voter registration.

A widespread belief exists that Raymond was the target that day. Mississippi burning trial testimonies state that the station wagon that Schwerner, Goodman and Chaney were murdered in belonged to Raymond. It was planned that Raymond drive that day but last minute changes occurred. Schwerner, Goodman and Chaney may have been casualties.

=== Meredith Mississippi march ===
Raymond participated in the Meredith Mississippi march near the town of Canton in June 1966. The march began with civil rights campaigner James Meredith setting out to walk from Memphis, Tennessee, to Jackson, Mississippi, in order to encourage African Americans along the way to register and vote. After Meredith was shot and wounded, other civil rights campaigners continued the march in his name.

=== Mississippi blues ===
The Club Desire, founded by Clarence Chinn (1906–1995), was one of Mississippi's premier blues and rhythm & blues nightclubs from the late 1940s through the early 1960s. Owner Clarence Chinn presented the top national acts, including B. B. King, Bobby Blue Bland, Little Junior Parker, James Brown, Ivory Joe Hunter, Big Joe Turner, Hank Ballard & The Midnighters, and the Platters. In the 1960s, the club also served as an important meeting place for civil rights workers.

After Chinn decided to focus his energy on real estate and housing, Raymond was one of New Club Desire operators. Raymond and C. O. Chinn (brother to Clarence Chinn) were Canton's leading civil rights activists in the 1960s. In addition to spreading the popularity of the Blues music, New Club Desire was used for meetings of civic, social, and civil rights organizations. The club closed in the 1970s.

Raymond died in 1973 from a heart attack, at the age of thirty. It is thought that his health was impacted by the dangers and trauma of his earlier activism.

== See also ==
- Sit-in movement
