= John Salter (disambiguation) =

John Salter is an American mixed martial artist.

John Salter may also refer to:

- John MacGregor Salter, known as Jock Salter (1898–1982), Anglo-Scottish footballer who played for Southampton
- John W. Salter (1852–1927), American politician
- John William Salter (1820–1869), English naturalist and geologist
- John Salter, Lord Mayor of London
- John Salter Jr. (1934–2019), Tougaloo College professor and participant in the U.S. Civil Rights Movement, including the sit-in at Woolworth's lunch counter

== See also ==
- Jake Clarke-Salter (born 1997), an English footballer
- Salter (surname)
