= I Know Why the Caged Bird Sings =

1969 autobiography by Maya Angelou

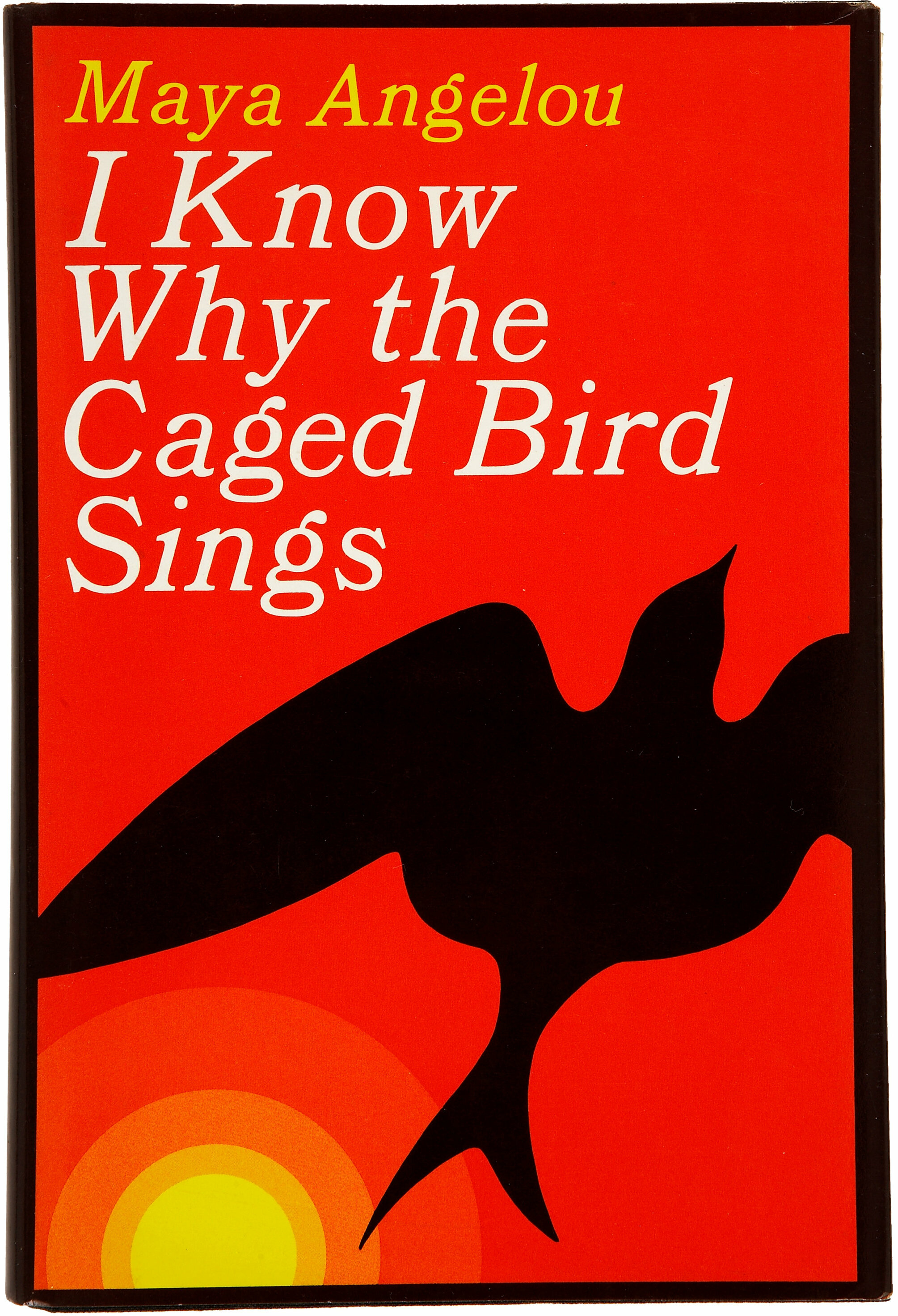
- Cover from the first edition
- Author: Maya Angelou
- Language: English
- Genre: Autobiography
- Published: February 1969 (Random House), 1st edition
- Publication place: United States
- Media type: Print (hardback and paperback)
- Pages: 304 (Trade paperback); 246 (Bantam paperback)
- ISBN: 978-0-8129-8002-8 (Random House Trade paperback reissue, April 21, 2009)
- Followed by: Gather Together in My Name

I Know Why the Caged Bird Sings is a 1969 autobiography describing the young and early years of American writer and poet Maya Angelou. The first in a seven-volume series, it is a coming-of-age story that illustrates how strength of character and a love of literature helped her to overcome racism and trauma. The book begins when three-year-old Maya and her older brother are sent to Stamps, Arkansas, to live with their grandmother and ends when Maya becomes a mother at the age of 16. In the course of Caged Bird, Maya transforms from a victim of racism with an inferiority complex into a self-possessed, dignified young woman capable of responding to prejudice.

Angelou was challenged by her friend, author James Baldwin, and her editor, Robert Loomis, to write an autobiography that was also a piece of literature. Reviewers often categorize Caged Bird as autobiographical fiction because Angelou uses thematic development and other techniques common to fiction, but the prevailing critical view characterizes it as an autobiography, a genre she attempts to critique, change, and expand. The book covers topics common to autobiographies written by black American women in the years following the Civil Rights Movement: a celebration of black motherhood; a critique of racism; the importance of family; and the quest for independence, personal dignity, and self-definition.

Angelou uses her autobiography to explore subjects such as identity, rape, racism, and literacy. She also writes in new ways about women's lives in a male-dominated society. Maya, the younger version of Angelou and the book's central character, has been called "a symbolic character for every black girl growing up in America". Angelou's description of being raped as an eight-year-old child overwhelms the book, although it is presented briefly in the text. Another metaphor, that of a bird struggling to escape its cage, is a central image throughout the work, which consists of "a sequence of lessons about resisting racist oppression". Angelou's treatment of racism provides a thematic unity to the book. Literacy and the power of words help young Maya cope with her bewildering world; books become her refuge as she works through her trauma.

Caged Bird was nominated for a National Book Award in 1970 and remained on The New York Times paperback bestseller list for two years. It has been used in educational settings from high schools to universities, and the book has been celebrated for creating new literary avenues for the American memoir. However, the book's graphic depiction of childhood rape, racism, and sexuality has caused it to be challenged or banned in some schools and libraries.

== Background ==
Before writing I Know Why the Caged Bird Sings at the age of forty, Maya Angelou had a long and varied career, holding jobs such as a composer, singer, actor, civil rights worker, journalist, and educator. In the late 1950s, she joined the Harlem Writers Guild, where she met a number of important African-American authors, including her friend and mentor James Baldwin. After hearing civil rights leader Martin Luther King Jr. speak for the first time in 1960, she was inspired to join the Civil Rights Movement. She organized several benefits for him, and he named her Northern Coordinator of the Southern Christian Leadership Conference. She worked for several years in Ghana, West Africa, as a journalist, actress, and educator. She was invited back to the US by Malcolm X to work for him shortly before his assassination in 1965. In 1968, King asked her to organize a march, but he too was assassinated on April 4, which was also her birthday. For many years, Angelou responded to King's murder by not celebrating her birthday, instead choosing to meet with, call, or send flowers to his widow, Coretta Scott King.

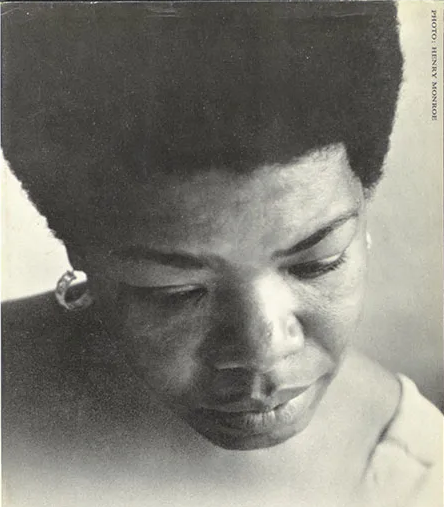
Angelou, 1969

Angelou was deeply depressed in the months following King's assassination, so to help lift her spirits, Baldwin brought her to a dinner party at the home of cartoonist Jules Feiffer and his wife Judy in late 1968. The guests began telling stories of their childhoods and Angelou's stories impressed Judy Feiffer. The next day Judy Feiffer called Robert Loomis at Random House, who became Angelou's editor throughout her long writing career until he retired in 2011, and "told him that he ought to get this woman to write a book". At first, Angelou refused, since she thought of herself as a poet and playwright, and was in the middle of writing a series for PBS television station WNET. According to Angelou, Baldwin had a "covert hand" in getting her to write the book, who advised Loomis to use "a little reverse psychology"; Angelou later reported that Loomis told her: "It's just as well, because to write an autobiography as literature is just about impossible". Angelou was unable to resist a challenge, and she began writing Caged Bird. After "closeting herself" in London, it took her two years to write it. She shared the manuscript with her friend, writer Jessica Mitford, before submitting it for publication.

Angelou subsequently wrote six additional autobiographies, covering a variety of her young adult experiences. They are distinct in style and narration, but unified in their themes, and stretch from Arkansas to Africa, and back to the U.S., from the beginnings of World War II to King's assassination. Like Caged Bird, the events in these books are episodic and crafted as a series of short stories, yet do not follow a strict chronology. Later books in the series include Gather Together in My Name (1974), Singin' and Swingin' and Gettin' Merry Like Christmas (1976), The Heart of a Woman (1981), All God's Children Need Traveling Shoes (1986), A Song Flung Up to Heaven (2002), and Mom & Me & Mom (2013, at the age of 85). Critics have often judged Angelou's later autobiographies "in light of the first", and Caged Bird generally receives the highest praise.

Beginning with Caged Bird, Angelou used the same "writing ritual" for many years. She would get up at 5 am and check into a hotel room, where the staff were instructed to remove pictures from the walls. She wrote on yellow legal pads while lying on the bed, with a bottle of sherry, a deck of cards to play solitaire, Roget's Thesaurus, and the Bible, and left by the early afternoon. She averaged 10–12 pages of material a day, which she edited down to three or four pages in the evening. Critic Mary Jane Lupton states that this ritual indicated "a firmness of purpose and an inflexible use of time". Angelou went through this process to give herself time to turn the events of her life into art, and to "enchant" herself; as she said in a 1989 interview with the BBC, to "relive the agony, the anguish, the Sturm und Drang". She placed herself back in the time she wrote about, even during traumatic experiences like her rape in Caged Bird, to "tell the human truth" about her life. Angelou stated that she played cards to reach that place of enchantment, to access her memories more effectively. She has stated, "It may take an hour to get into it, but once I'm in it—ha! It's so delicious!" She did not find the process cathartic; rather, she found relief in "telling the truth". Angelou told scholar Joanne M. Braxton that she tried to "suspend herself from the present" while writing her autobiographies and put herself into the time wrote about, despite understanding that "I might be trapped in that time", a process she called "frightening". According to Myra K. McMurray, when Angelou was often asked how she escaped from her painful past, she would respond, "How the hell do you know I did escape?" McMurray states that Caged Bird is not "an exorcism of or escape from the past", but that it was "a transmutation of that past", adding, "The almost novelistic clarity of Caged Bird results from the artistic tension between Angelou's recollected self and her authorial consciousness".

=== Title ===
When selecting a title, Angelou turned to Paul Laurence Dunbar, an African American poet whose works she had admired for years. Jazz vocalist and civil rights activist Abbey Lincoln suggested the title. According to Lyman B. Hagen, the title pulls Angelou's readers into the book while reminding them that it is possible to both lose control of one's life and to have one's freedom taken from them. Angelou has credited Dunbar, along with Shakespeare, with forming her "writing ambition". According to Mary Jane Lupton, the caged bird in the title symbolizes a chained slave and appears frequently in Angelou's writings. Lupton also discusses Angelou's use of the word "sings", which she says critics have tended to downplay. The word creates an upward mood and "suggests the survival of African Americans through the spiritual". Although singing is more developed in Angelou's later books, she hints at the "possibilities of joyful song" in Caged Bird. Finally, also according to Lupton, the cage is a symbol of the restraint of not only the Black body, but of the female Black body. The cage is also a metaphor for the roles that force the bird to deny its identity and reject interrelationships with others, not just for the child Maya, but for almost everyone in her community.

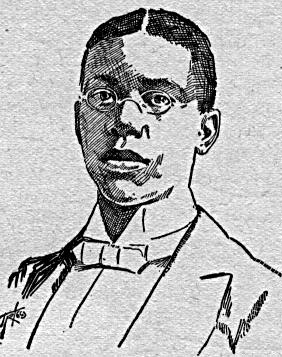
The book's title comes from a poem by African-American poet Paul Laurence Dunbar. The caged bird, a symbol for the chained slave, is an image Angelou uses throughout all her writings.

The title of the book comes from the third stanza of Dunbar's poem "Sympathy": (Note: Angelou returned to Dunbar's poem for the title of her sixth autobiography, A Song Flung Up to Heaven (2002).)

I know why the caged bird sings, ah me,
When his wing is bruised and his bosom sore,
When he beats his bars and would be free;
It is not a carol of joy or glee,
But a prayer that he sends from his heart's deep core,
But a plea, that upward to Heaven he flings—
I know why the caged bird sings.

== Plot summary ==
I Know Why the Caged Bird Sings follows Marguerite's (called "My" or "Maya" by her brother) life from the age of three to seventeen and the struggles she faces—particularly with racism and self-affirmation—in the Southern United States. Abandoned by their parents, Maya and her older brother Bailey are sent to live with their paternal grandmother (Momma) and disabled uncle (Uncle Willie) in Stamps, Arkansas. Maya and Bailey are haunted by their parents' abandonment throughout the book: they travel alone and are labeled like baggage.

The community of Stamps, Arkansas, is the setting for a large portion of the book.

Many of the problems Maya encounters in her childhood stem from the overt racism of her white neighbors and the subliminal awareness of race relations weaved in society. Although Momma is relatively wealthy because she owns the general store at the heart of Stamps' Black community, the white children of their town, in an "almost ritual insult", hassle Maya's family relentlessly. One of these "powhitetrash" girls, for example, reveals her pubic hair to Momma in a humiliating incident which leaves Maya, watching from a distance, indignant and furious. Early in the book, Momma hides Uncle Willie in a vegetable bin to protect him from Ku Klux Klan raiders, where he moans and groans under the potatoes throughout the night. Maya has to endure the insult of her name being changed to Mary by a racist employer. A white speaker at her eighth-grade graduation ceremony disparages the Black audience by suggesting that they have limited job opportunities. A white dentist refuses to treat Maya's rotting tooth, even when Momma reminds him that she had loaned him money during the Depression. The Black community of Stamps enjoys a moment of racial victory when they listen to the radio broadcast of Joe Louis's championship fight, but generally, they feel the heavy weight of racist oppression.

A turning point in the book occurs when Maya and Bailey's father unexpectedly appears in Stamps. He takes the two children with him when he departs, but leaves them with their mother in St. Louis. Eight-year-old Maya is sexually abused and raped by her mother's boyfriend, 'Mr. Freeman'. He is found guilty during the trial, but escapes jail time and gets murdered, presumably by Maya's uncles. Maya feels guilty and withdraws from everyone but her brother. Even after returning to Stamps, Maya remains reclusive and nearly mute until she meets Mrs. Bertha Flowers, "the aristocrat of Black Stamps," who encourages her through books to regain her voice. This coaxes Maya out of her shell.

Later, Momma decides to send her grandchildren to their mother in San Francisco, California, to protect them from the dangers of racism in Stamps. Maya attends George Washington High School and studies dance and drama on a scholarship at the California Labor School. Before graduating, she becomes the first Black female cable car conductor in San Francisco. While still in high school, Maya visits her father in southern California one summer and has some experiences pivotal to her development. She drives a car for the first time when she must transport her intoxicated father home from an excursion to Mexico. She experiences homelessness for a short time after a fight with her father's girlfriend.

During Maya's final year of high school, she worries that she might be a lesbian (which she confuses due to her sexual inexperience with the belief that lesbians are also hermaphrodites). She ultimately initiates sexual intercourse with a teenage boy. She becomes pregnant, which, on the advice of her brother, she hides from her family until her eighth month of pregnancy in order to graduate from high school. Maya gives birth to her son at the end of the book.

== Style and genre ==
Angelou's prose works, while presenting a unique interpretation of the autobiographical form, can be placed in the long tradition of African-American autobiography. Her use of fiction-writing techniques such as dialogue, characterization, and thematic development, however, often lead reviewers to categorize her books, including I Know Why the Caged Bird Sings, as autobiographical fiction. Other critics, like Mary Jane Lupton, insist that Angelou's books should be categorized as autobiographies because they conform to the genre's standard structure: they are written by a single author, they are chronological, and they contain elements of character, technique, and theme. In a 1983 interview with African-American literature critic Claudia Tate, Angelou calls her books autobiographies. Dolly McPherson states that Angelou's work demonstrates how a writer can use the autobiography to define her quest for human individuality, identify her struggle with "the general condition of Black Americans", and claim a representative role not only for Black Americans, but for "the idea of America". McPherson goes on to say that "through a study of her work, one gains a closer access to American cultural history".

As Lupton states, what makes Angelou's autobiographies different than more conventional autobiographies is her "denial of closure". Lupton says that no other serial autobiography places the mother/child theme in the center of the conflict, which made it important to the book's narrative. Lupton calls the narrative style in Caged Bird "rich, humorous, intense, engaging". The language Angelou uses can be frightening and her dialogue in the book, which is sharp and direct, conveys her characters' distinctive language and both reflects the language of her literary models and draws on the Southern speech patterns of her characters. Her use of metaphor places Angelou "within the stylistic tradition of black protest literature". She also uses precision to describe objects or places and her observations are sensual. As Lupton puts it, "Her writing resembles a series of photographs or fragments of music: snapshots taken from many angles, notes played from a variety of instruments". McPherson agrees, stating that in her autobiographies, Angelou "uses the narrative gifts of an accomplished writer". Braxton compares Angelou's style to that of Zora Neale Hurston and Era Bell Thompson, stating that Angelou also uses "rhythmic language, lyrically suspended moments of consciousness, and detailed portraiture". Braxton, due to Angelou's use of humor and folklore, also calls her a "tale-teller par excellence." Harold Bloom, who does not think as highly of Angelou's poetry and does not find her subsequent autobiographies as compelling as her first, compares the tone in Caged Bird with the tone Rudyard Kipling uses in Kim, stating that Angelou "provides us with a voice that we encounter very infrequently, whether in life or in literature". According to Susan Gilbert, however, while Angelou records African American cadences and speech patterns, she does not limit herself "to the tongues of black Arkansas or ghetto streets". For example, Angelou describes the codeswitching that many in her community engage in; as Gilbert also says, the language Angelou uses "moves between a strong, colloquial simplicity and a sometimes over-blown literary mannerism".

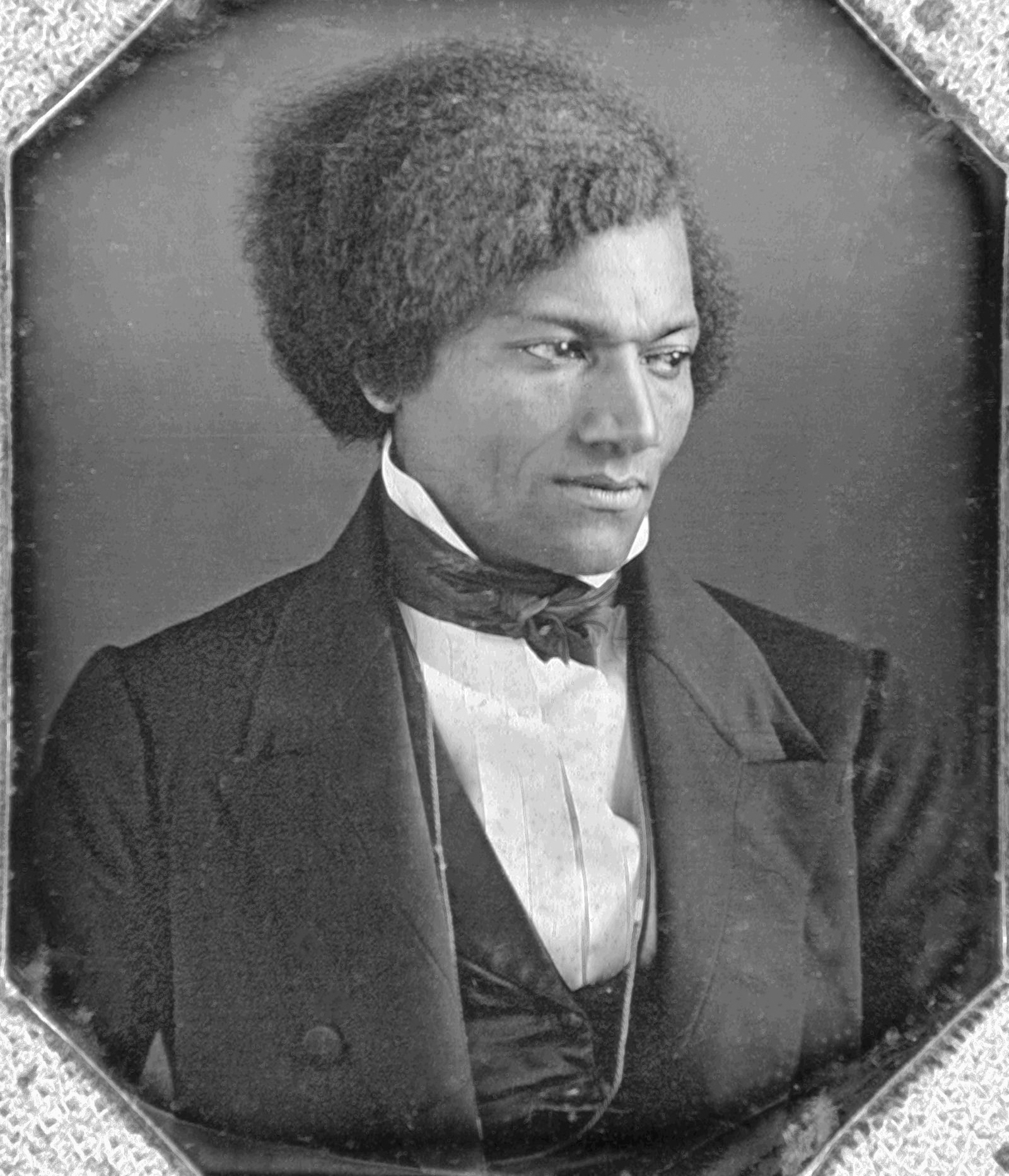
Frederick Douglass, 1840s. Angelou's autobiographies are within the tradition of the slave narrative, such as Douglass' Narrative of the Life of Frederick Douglass, an American Slave (1845).

At first, Angelou intended to return to poetry and play-writing after completing Caged Bird and write no more autobiographies, but as she stated in an interview in 1989, she chose the genre as her primary mode of expression because of its challenge and so that she could "change it, to make it bigger, richer, finer, and more inclusive in the twentieth century", adding that "I think I am the only serious writer who has chosen the autobiographical form to carry my work, my expression". McPherson agrees, stating in 1990 that no other American writer had chosen to make their "major literary and cultural contribution so predominately in autobiographical form". As Angelou told journalist George Plimpton during a 1990 interview, "Autobiography is awfully seductive; it's wonderful". She also told Plimpton that like the tradition begun by Frederick Douglass in slave narratives, she used the literary technique of "speaking in the first-person singular talking about the first-person plural, always saying I meaning 'we'". As critic Susan Gilbert states, Angelou was reporting not one person's story, but the collective's. Scholar Selwyn R. Cudjoe agrees, and sees Angelou as representative of the convention in African-American autobiography as a public gesture that speaks for an entire group of people. Angelou, throughout her series of autobiographies, also seeks to describe the personal, cultural, social, and historical influences that shaped her life and identity. Her experiences, as described in her books, "represent stages of her spiritual growth and awareness". As McPherson puts it, Angelou's autobiographies "creates a unique place within Black autobiographical tradition" and reveal "important insights into Black traditions and culture". Unlike other Black autobiographers like Anne Moody in Coming of Age in Mississippi, however, Angelou is less concerned with her book's place or setting, and instead focuses on her growing awareness of her environment.

Joanne Braxton sees Caged Bird as "the fully developed black female autobiographical form that began to emerge in the 1940s and 1950s". Scholar Selwyn R. Cudjoe states that Caged Bird was written during an important period for African American literature, when there was an influx of prose writings by African American women. The book presents themes that are common in autobiography by Black American women: a celebration of Black motherhood; a criticism of racism; the importance of family; and the quest for independence, personal dignity, and self-definition. Angelou introduces a unique point of view in American autobiography by revealing her life story through a narrator who is a Black female from the South, at some points a child, and other points a mother. As Gilbert puts it, "the reader of the book must deal throughout the dual perspective of the child, growing to consciousness of herself and the limits of her world, and the author, experienced, confident, and didactic". Braxton states that Caged Bird has two points of view, the child and the mature narrator/artist; while the child's point of view governs Angelou's "principle of selection", the tone of the adult narrator is personal and compelled to explore aspects of her coming of age. Keneth Kinnamon states that like other Black female writers and unlike many male writers, Angelou was concerned with themes such as community, sexism, sexual exploitation, and relationships with family friends.

George E. Kent states that due to "its special stance toward the self, the community, and the universe", Caged Bird has a unique place within Black autobiography. McPherson says about Angelou: "I know of no other autobiographer in American letters who celebrates and sings her life with as much verve and display of vulnerability", adding that Angelou has demonstrated how the genre of the autobiography "can be transformed into a strong evocation of the human spirit". Writer Hilton Als calls Angelou one of the "pioneers of self-exposure", willing to focus honestly on the more negative aspects of her personality and choices. For example, Angelou was worried about her readers' reactions to her disclosure in her second autobiography, Gather Together in My Name, that she was a prostitute. She went through with it, anyway, after her husband Paul Du Feu advised her to be honest about it.

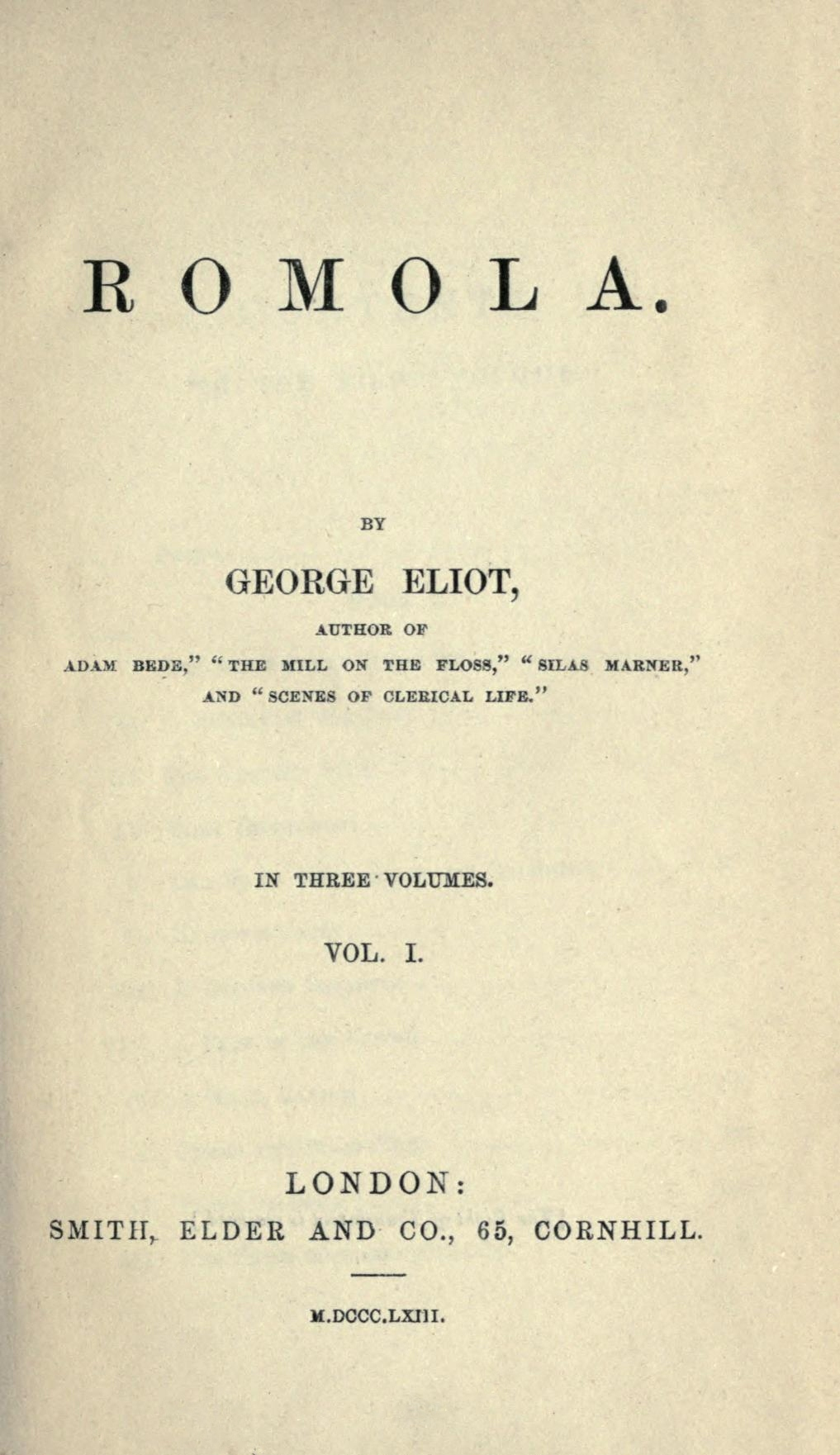
In addition to being classified as an autobiography, I Know Why the Caged Bird Sings has also been called a Bildungsroman, like George Eliot's The Mill on the Floss.

Angelou has recognized that there are fictional aspects to her books, and that she tends to "diverge from the conventional notion of autobiography as truth". Angelou discussed her writing process with Plimpton, and when asked if she changed the truth to improve her story, she admitted that she had. She stated, "Sometimes I make a diameter from a composite of three or four people, because the essence in only one person is not sufficiently strong to be written about". Although Angelou has never admitted to changing the facts in her stories, she has used these facts to make an impact with the reader. As Hagen states, "One can assume that 'the essence of the data' is present in Angelou's work", adding that Angelou "fictionalizes, to enhance interest". For example, Angelou uses the first-person narrative voice customary with autobiographies, told from the perspective, as Lupton puts it, of a child that is "artfully recreated by an adult narrator", although at times the book sounds more like fiction than autobiography. Harold Bloom says that, "like all autobiographies, [Caged Bird] has fictive elements, but whatever they may be, they evidently work to the book's engaging artfulness". Angelou identifies with slavery, verifying its power in her life and works, but Black womanhood and truth, themes found throughout the history of Black autobiography, is transformed by the period she describes. As Lupton puts it, "In Caged Bird, for example, she records a life story begun in fear of crosses burning in the night, a life that is directly affected by the brutal remnants of slavery". Lupton states that Angelou presents material not found in other autobiographies, written by both Black and white writers, because she addresses topics from the perspective of an African American woman. Lupton also compares Caged Bird and the next four volumes to prison narratives, although through her use of the caged bird symbol, her prison is symbolic rather than literal.

Caged Bird has been called a bildungsroman; for example, Lupton compares it to other bildungsromans like George Eliot's novel The Mill on the Floss. According to Lupton, Caged Bird and The Mill on the Floss share the following similarities: a focus on young strong-willed heroines who have solid relationships with their brothers; an examination of the role of literature in life; and an emphasis on the importance of family and community life. Angelou uses two distinct voices, the adult writer and the child who is the focus of the book, whom Angelou calls "the Maya character". Angelou reports that maintaining the distinction between herself and the Maya character is "damned difficult", but "very necessary". Scholar Liliane Arensberg, in her discussion about the theme of death in Caged Bird, suggests that Angelou "retaliates for the tongue-tied child's helpless pain" by using her adult self's irony and wit. As Lupton says, Maya "fills readers' imaginations as have very few similar characters in American autobiography" as she evolves from child to woman.

== Form ==
When Angelou wrote I Know Why the Caged Bird Sings at the end of the 1960s, one of the necessary and accepted features of literature, according to critic Pierre A. Walker, was thematic unity. One of Angelou's goals was to create a book that satisfied this criterion, in order to achieve her political purposes, which were to demonstrate how to resist racism in America. The structure of the text, which resembles a series of short stories, is not chronological but is arranged according to themes. Walker, in his 1993 article about Caged Bird, "Racial Protest, Identity, Words, and Form", focuses on the book's structure, and describes how it supports her presentation of racism. Walker states that critics had neglected analyzing its structure, choosing to focus instead on its themes, which he feels neglects the political nature of the book. He states, "One serves Angelou and Caged Bird better by emphasizing how form and political content work together". Angelou structures her book so that it presents a series of lessons about how to resist racism and oppression. Maya's growth in resisting racism unifies the book thematically, something that "stands in contrast to the otherwise episodic quality of the narrative". The way in which Angelou constructs, arranges, and organizes her vignettes often undermine the chronology of her childhood by "juxtaposing the events of one chapter with the events of preceding and following ones so that they too comment on each other". As Dolly McPherson points out, Angelou does not record every experience, but instead selects, through a series of episodic chapters, "valuable, life-determining truths about the world, about her community, and about herself". Lupton points out that Caged Bird's form develops from the characters' interaction with each other, not through the development of dramatic actions. According to scholar Sondra O'Neale, unlike Angelou's poetry and despite the nonchronological structure of the book, which O'Neale calls "skillfully controlled", Angelou's prose "follows classic technique in nonpoetic Western forms".

"During the months she spent writing the book, [Angelou] practically withdrew from the world. She'd set the bar high. Her ambition was to write a book that would honor the Black experience and affirm the 'human spirit.' She more than achieved her goal. She wrote a coming-of-age story that has become a modern classic".

— Marcia Ann Gillespie

The incident with the "powhitetrash" girls in Caged Bird takes place in chapter 5, when Maya was ten years old, well before Angelou's recounting of her rape in chapter 12, which occurred when Maya was 8. Walker explains that Angelou's purpose in placing the vignettes in this way is that it followed her thematic structure. Angelou's editor, Robert Loomis, agrees, stating that Angelou could rewrite any of her books by changing the order of her facts to make a different impact on the reader. Hagen sees Angelou's structure somewhat differently, focusing on Maya's journey "to establish a worthwhile self-concept", and states that she structures the book into three parts: arrival, sojourn, and departure, which occur both geographically and psychologically. Hagen notes that she does not begin Caged Bird chronologically, with Maya and Bailey's arrival in Stamps. Rather, she begins it later much later, with an embarrassing experience during an Easter service at church, an incident that demonstrates Maya's diminished sense of self, insecurity, and lack of status. George E. Kent divides Caged Bird into two "areas of black life": the religious-folk tradition, as represented through Maya's grandmother, and the blues-street tradition, as represented through her mother. Kent states that the first impact of the blues-street tradition on Maya and her brother is instability, when their mother ships the children to Stamps. Kent goes on to say that Angelou balances the qualities of both traditions, adding that "a good deal of the book's universality derives from black life's traditions seeming to mirror, with extraordinary intensity, the root uncertainty in the universe".

Sidonie Ann Smith states that Angelou starts the book with the Easter service incident because it "defines the strategy of the narrative". Smith also states that Angelou follows the convention in Black American autobiography, especially slave narratives, which recreates the environment of enslavement and oppression at the beginning, before describing how the protagonist escapes from it. Hagen explains that Angelou's purpose is to demonstrate Maya's journey from insecurity to her feelings of worth gained by becoming a mother at the end of the book. Even though the book begins with the Easter service, Angelou begins her "autobiographical journey" in Caged Bird with Maya and Bailey's train ride from California to Arkansas and continues in a triangular movement between Stamps, St. Louis, and California; according to Lupton, the reader, by following Maya's journeys, "can get a solid sense of how structure operates within an autobiographical text". McPherson states that Angelou opens Caged Bird with the Easter poem, which she evaluates in light of the book's plot and themes, because it emphasizes its significance in her life, describes her rootlessness, and "is also a blues metaphor that foreshadows a cyclical pattern of renewal, rebirth, change in consciousness, and the circuitous journey of recovered innocence".

== Themes ==
=== Identity ===
The Black female is assaulted in her tender years by all those common forces of nature at the same time that she is caught in the tripartite crossfire of male prejudice, white illogical hate and Black lack of power.

— Maya Angelou, I Know Why the Caged Bird Sings

In the course of Caged Bird, Maya, who has been described as "a symbolic character for every black girl growing up in America", goes from being a victim of racism with an inferiority complex to a self-aware individual who responds to racism with dignity and a strong sense of her own identity. Feminist scholar Maria Lauret states that the "formation of female cultural identity" is woven into the book's narrative, setting Maya up as "a role model for Black women". Scholar Liliane Arensberg calls this presentation Angelou's "identity theme" and a major motif in Angelou's narrative. McPherson states that the heart of Caged Bird, which she calls Angelou's "singular traditional focus" is "the growth of the individual from innocence to knowledge". Sidonie Ann Smith, using the opening incident at church, connects Maya's appearance with the imprisonment and displacement imposed on her by the white society around her. Smith goes on to say that the pain of Maya's displacement is intensified by her awareness of the displacement, a personal displacement that is amplified by "the ambience of displacement within the larger black community". Maya's displacement and "diminished self of self" is reflected in her community's diminished self image. Smith also connects Maya's rape with her displacement, stating that Mr. Freeman took advantage of Maya's feelings of abandonment, self-loathing, and rejection. Maya is freed from her further displacement by Mrs. Flowers, who accepted Maya for who she was and "allows her to experience the incipient power of her own self-worth". Braxton states that Angelou's "celebration of self" is nurtured and developed by Black women—Momma, Mrs. Flowers, and even Maya's mother, Vivian. Both Momma and Vivian are different representations of "the Jungian archetype of the Great Mother, protecting, nurturing, sheltering".

After Momma sends the children to their mother in California to protect them from the racism in Stamps, Maya learns from Vivian increased self-reliance; Braxton adds that Maya "grows out of the passive stage, asserting herself through action, and forging an identity". Maya's earlier rebellion against Mrs. Cullinan, her racist white employer, is another way she preserves her individual and affirms her self-worth. Smith connects this incident with Maya's grandmother's decision to send Maya and Bailey to their mother in San Francisco, where Maya finally feels at home; as Smith puts it, "She could feel in place in an environment where everyone and everything seemed out-of-place". This was solidified in her experiences in Mexico and San Diego with her father, her short period of homelessness, and her pregnancy and birth of her son. The book ends in this way: "The black American girl child has succeeded in freeing herself from the natural and social bars imprisoning her in the cage of her own diminished self-image by assuming control of her life and fully accepting her black womanhood". Angelou told a interviewer that she did not set out, while writing Caged Bird, thinking out her own life or identity, but that she was "thinking about a particular time in which I lived and the influence of that time on a number of people...I used the central figure—myself—as a focus to show how one person can make it through those times". Maya's unsettled life in Caged Bird suggests her sense of self "as perpetually in the process of becoming, of dying and being reborn, in all its ramifications". Angelou begins to describe her changing identity in the book's early pages describing the Easter church service, when Maya painfully realizes that her fantasy of becoming white will never happen. As Dolly McPherson states, the scene graphically re-creates "the dynamics of many young black girls' disillusionment and imprisonment in American society", which gives the message to Maya and girls like her that physical beauty is defined in terms of whiteness. Arensberg states that Maya's displacement, or rootlessness, as well as her geographic movements and temporary residences throughout the book, are formative aspects of Maya's identity. It also helps her develop "a stoic flexibility" that becomes a way for her to both protect herself against and deal with the world around her. According to Arensberg, the flexibility is "both a blessing and a curse: it enables her to adapt to various and changing environments, but it also keeps her forever threatened with loss or breakdown of her identity".

Indeed, Angelou's descriptions of her younger self seem almost entirely composed of negatives: she is not wanted by her parents, who hold over her the unspoken but everpresent threat of banishment; she is not beautiful or articulate like her brother, Bailey; she is too introverted and passive to assert herself on her environment; and finally, she is a child in a world of enigmatic adults, and a black girl in a world created by and for the benefit of white men.

— Scholar Liliane K. Arensberg

Maya fantasizes that she is white because she feels unloved, especially by her parents; both she and her brother deal with their abandonment and rejection by pretending that their mother was dead. McPherson also states that Angelou's statement in Caged Bird, "If growing up is painful for the Southern Black girl, being aware of her displacement is the rust on the razor that threatens the throat. It is an unnecessary insult" characterize important parts of Angelou's life and "provide wide-ranging, significant themes" of the book. Selwyn R. Cudjoe agrees, stating that the statement contains the "pervading themes" in Caged Bird. McPherson states that unlike Christ, whose death and resurrection was being celebrated, it was impossible for Maya to be "born into another life where she will be white and perfect and wonderful", although Angelou creatively uses Christian mythology and theology to present the Biblical themes of death, regeneration, and rebirth in the book and "skillfully re-creates the psychic, intellectual, and emotional patterns that identify her individual consciousness and experience". Maya's childhood is shaped by her religiously devout grandmother, who although was not emotionally demonstrative, Maya knew that she was loved by her, which strengthened Maya as she grew and developed into childhood and early adolescence. As Angelou wrote in Caged Bird, "a deep-brooding love hung over everything [Momma] touched". Liliane Arensberg finds it significant that the first vignette Angelou presents in Caged Bird is her embarrassing incident at the Easter Sunday church service; even though the incident is out of order chronologically, Angelou considers it "an epiphanic moment of her youth" because it presents Maya's identity as a young child, her blackness and her outcast status. Angelou compares the repurposed dress Maya wore to the crepe paper at the back of a hearse, which represented Maya's body and the death of her fantasy about whiteness. As Arensberg states, Maya is forced to acknowledge her blackness and the "malevolent force beyond her control that dictates her personal and racial identity".

As Lauret indicates, Angelou and other female writers in the late 1960s and early 1970s used autobiography to reimagine ways of writing about women's lives and identities in a male-dominated society. Up until this time, Black women were not depicted realistically in African American fiction and autobiography, meaning that Angelou was one of the first Black autobiographers to present, as Cudjoe put it, "a powerful and authentic signification of womanhood in her quest for understanding and love rather than for bitterness and despair". Lauret sees a connection between Angelou's autobiographies, which Lauret calls "fictions of subjectivity" and "feminist first-person narratives", and fictional first-person narratives (such as The Women's Room by Marilyn French and The Golden Notebook by Doris Lessing) written during the same period. As French and Lessing do in their novels, Angelou employs the narrator as protagonist and depends upon "the illusion of presence in their mode of signification". Maya is "the forgotten child", and must come to terms with "the unimaginable reality" of being unloved and unwanted; she lives in a hostile world that defines beauty in terms of whiteness and that rejects her simply because she is a Black girl. Maya internalizes the rejection she has experienced; for example, her belief in her own ugliness was "absolute".

Angelou uses her many roles, incarnations, and identities throughout her books to illustrate how oppression and personal history are interrelated. For example, in Caged Bird, Angelou demonstrates the "racist habit" of renaming African Americans, as shown when her white employer insists on calling her "Mary". Angelou describes the employer's renaming as the "hellish horror of being 'called out of [one's] name'". Scholar Debra Walker King calls it a racist insult and an assault against Maya's race and self-image. Cudjoe, who calls the incident "poignant", states the renaming denies Maya of her individuality, although Maya's response shocks Mrs. Cullinan into "(re)cognition of her personhood". King, in her discussion of the discourse production of poetic names in African American literature and its gendered difference, states that Angelou uses what King calls "name fragmentation" in this vignette. It also demonstrates "the subversive complexities and resistive nature of black names' deep talk when confronted with racist oppression", which is the point of the vignette. Angelou uses the conflicts of renaming to demonstrate that resistance to the practice and to communicate a confrontation of linguistic control, or as King puts it, "a battle for dominion and control over the naming process". The renaming emphasizes Maya's feelings of inadequacy and denigrates her identity, individuality, and uniqueness. As King puts it, the renaming "stresses the violent effects of being renamed through the contaminating sieve of racism".

Another incident in the book that solidifies Maya's identity is her trip to Mexico with her father, when she has to drive a car for the first time. Contrasted with her experience in Stamps, Maya is finally "in control of her fate".This experience is central to Maya's growth, as is the incident that immediately follows it, her short period of homelessness after arguing with her father's girlfriend. These two incidents give Maya a knowledge of self-determination and confirm her self-worth. Her experience of homelessness also teaches her that "outside the barriers of race, all men and women are the same" and confirms her commitment to her personal growth. McPherson connects Maya's experiences while visiting her father with her determination and accomplishment of becoming the first streetcar conductor in San Francisco several months later.

Scholar Mary Burgher believes that female Black autobiographers like Angelou have debunked the stereotypes of African American mothers as "breeder[s] and matriarch[s]", and have presented them as having "a creative and personally fulfilling role". Lupton believes that Angelou's plot construction and character development were influenced by the same mother/child motif as is found in the work of Harlem Renaissance poet Jessie Fauset. For the first five years of her life, Maya thinks of herself as an orphan and finds comfort in the thought that her mother is dead. Maya's feelings for and relationship with her mother, whom she blames for her abandonment, express themselves in ambivalence and "repressed violent aggression". For example, Maya and her brother destroy the first Christmas gifts sent to them by their mother. Being sent away from their parents was a psychological rejection, and resulted in a quest for love, acceptance, and self-worth for both Maya and Bailey. McPherson believes that family, or as she calls it, "kinship concerns", is an important theme in Caged Bird, which due to the siblings' early displacement, begins with a preoccupation with the nuclear family, but evolves into a dependence upon the extended family. Maya's conflict about her mother is not resolved until the end of the book, when Maya becomes a mother herself, and her mother finally becomes the nurturing presence for which Maya has longed. The two main maternal influences on Maya's life change as well; Vivian becomes a more active participant, while Momma becomes less effective as Maya. As she becomes a mother herself, Maya moves from childhood to adulthood. Braxton adds that Maya does more than move from semi-orphanhood to motherhood; she also grows through various stages of self-awareness. McPherson states that as the book ends, Maya is no longer a displaced child; as a new mother, she takes control of her life and fully accepts her womanhood. As Susan Gilbert puts it, unlike at the beginning of the book, "the writer neither wishes to be white nor fears for her black son". Braxton adds that Maya's entry into motherhood is an assertion of her identity as both a mother and a daughter, "as well as her relation to the maternal archetype". The birth of Maya's son opened up new avenues of identity, not only for herself, but for her grandmother and mother as well.

=== Racism ===
Joanne M. Braxton calls Caged Bird "perhaps the most aesthetically satisfying autobiography written in the years immediately following the Civil Rights era". Pierre A. Walker expresses a similar sentiment, and places it in the African American literature tradition of political protest. Stamps, Arkansas, as depicted in Caged Bird, has very little "social ambiguity"; it is a racist world divided between Black and white, male and female. Angelou demonstrates, through her involvement with the Black community of Stamps, her presentation of vivid and realistic racist characters, "the vulgarity of white Southern attitudes toward African Americans", and her developing understanding of the rules for surviving in a racist society. Hilton Als characterizes the division as "good and evil", and notes how Angelou's witness of the evil in her society, which was directed at Black women, shaped Angelou's young life and informed her views into adulthood. Angelou uses the metaphor of a bird struggling to escape its cage, described in Paul Laurence Dunbar's poem, as a prominent symbol throughout her series of autobiographies. Like elements within a prison narrative, the caged bird represents Angelou's confinement resulting from racism and oppression, forces that were outside Maya's control or comprehension. The caged bird metaphor also invokes the "supposed contradiction of the bird singing in the midst of its struggle". Scholar Ernece B. Kelley calls Caged Bird a "gentle indictment of white American womanhood"; Hagen expands it further, stating that the book is "a dismaying story of white dominance". In the Stamps of Caged Bird, although "segregation was so complete that most Black children didn't really, absolutely know what Whites looked like" and Blacks rarely interacted with them, the white world was a constant threat and Blacks were expected to behave in a certain way in order to survive. As Keneth Kinnamon states, Angelou does not de-emphasize the effects of racism on her community, but "shows with respect if not always agreement the defensive and compensatory patterns needed to survive in such an environment". Lupton, who sees the themes of racism and slavery as separate from imprisonment in Caged Bird, states that Maya constantly feels caged, "unable to escape the reality of her blackness". Imprisonment is also expressed in the book's title.

The caged bird sings
with a fearful trill
of things unknown
but longed for still
and his tune is heard
on the distant hill
for the caged bird
sings of freedom.

— The final stanza of Maya Angelou's poem "Caged Bird"

Angelou's autobiographies, beginning with Caged Bird, contain a sequence of lessons about resisting oppression. The sequence she describes leads Angelou, as the protagonist, from "helpless rage and indignation to forms of subtle resistance, and finally to outright and active protest". Walker insists that Angelou's treatment of racism is what gives her autobiographies their thematic unity and underscores one of their central themes: the injustice of racism and how to fight it. In Angelou's depiction of the "powhitetrash" incident, Maya reacts with rage, indignation, humiliation, and helplessness. Angelou portrays Momma as a realist whose patience, courage, and silence ensured the survival and success of those who came after her. As Braxton put it, the white and female children "deliberately exploit their protected status to intimidate and humiliate" Maya's family. Braxton also considers the incident an implied threat towards the men in the family. Momma teaches Maya how they can maintain their personal dignity and pride while dealing with racism, and that it is an effective basis for actively protesting and combating racism. Walker calls Momma's way a "strategy of subtle resistance"; Dolly McPherson calls it "the dignified course of silent endurance" and "a pivotal experience in her initiation" of Maya's awareness about her place in the racist world. McPherson, who considers the incident "a dramatic re-enactment of the kind of spiritual death and regeneration Angelou experienced during the shaping of her development", also states that the incident taught Maya how her grandmother was able to survive and triumph psychologically in a hostile environment. Not only was it a depiction of the tensions between Blacks and whites during the period, it also depicted how Momma was able to protest, transcend the children's behavior towards her, and preserve her own dignity. Braxton states that the incident demonstrates Momma's courage, a virtue Angelou learns to use and develop from her; Angelou praises Momma's courage in the book and praises it in later writings. Courage in the face of racism is also shown in Angelou's treatment of lynching. Early in the book, Momma helps a man trying to escape lynching by hiding him and giving him supplies for his journey, thus endangering her own security. Later, the family has to conceal Uncle Willy from a potential lynch mob in their store's potato and onion bin. Braxton states that it demonstrates the absurdity of lynching and that in this incident, Momma "fulfills the archetypical role of the outraged mother by concealing her innocent child".

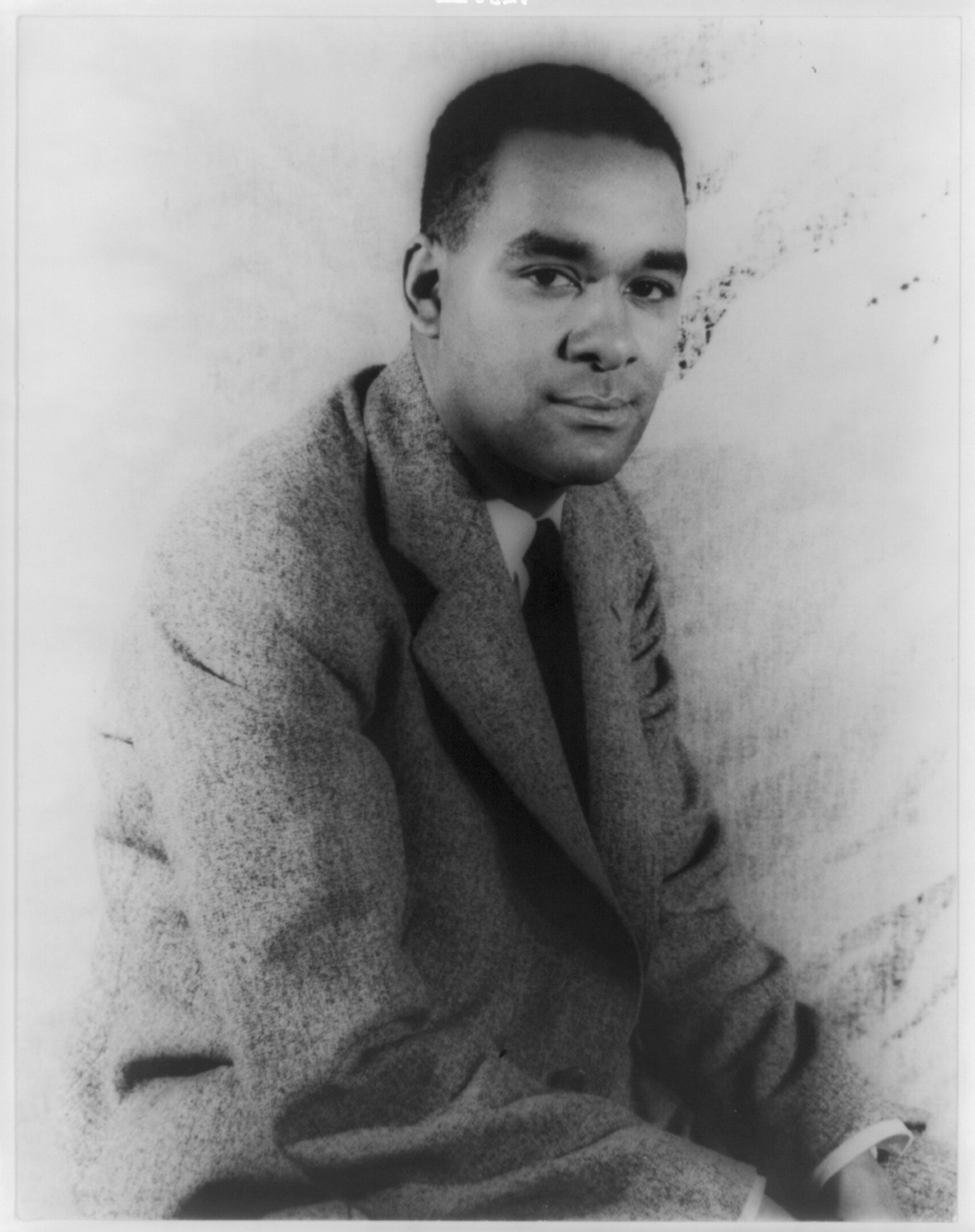
Angelou's treatment of racism has been compared to the writings of Richard Wright (shown here in 1939).

Angelou later said that her years living in Africa and her relationship to South African freedom fighter Vusumzi Make in the early 1960s taught her "to see the survival of distinctly African ways" among African Americans, which affect her portrayal of character, both collectively and individually. For example, as Susan Gilbert puts it, Angelou "relates the habits of address...to a heritage of tribal belonging". Angelou's description of the strong and cohesive black community of Stamps also demonstrates how African Americans subvert repressive institutions. Angelou demonstrates how religion, which "was designed to keep the Afro-American in an oppressed condition", has been subverted and used by her community to help them withstand the cruelty of racism. McPherson states that Angelou's depiction of the economic displacement of Black cotton field workers, who gather at Momma's store before and after work and could never get ahead despite their hard work, demonstrates how the Black community nurtures its members and helps them survive in an antagonistic environment. Angelou's depiction of the Joe Lewis fight demonstrates how her community has subverted the American institution of sports. As Selwyn R. Cudjoe puts it, the fight was supposed to "act as a pacifier, as entertainment for Blacks, and to help demonstrate how far they had progressed in the society". Instead, it became a recreation of the struggle between white and Black America. Later in the book, Maya responds assertively when subjected to demeaning treatment by Mrs. Cullinan and breaks the race barrier when she becomes the first Black streetcar operator in San Francisco. (Note: In 2014, Angelou was honored by the Conference of Minority Transportation Officials with a lifetime-achievement award for this accomplishment. She also wrote about it in her final autobiography, Mom & Me & Mom (2013).) McPherson states that Maya's experience with Mrs. Cullinan places her "into a clearer awareness of social reality and into a growing consciousness of self-worth". Mrs. Cullinan's attempt to change Maya's name to fit her own convenience also "echoes the larger tradition of American racism that attempts to prescribe the nature and limitations of a Black person's identity". Maya stands up for her individuality and value by deliberately breaking Mrs. Cullinan's heirloom china.

Angelou describes other incidences that demonstrate the strength and unity in Stamps. As McPherson puts it, "Unlike the white American, in order for the individual black American to be self-reliant, he or she must rely on the community". Lupton states that Angelou's emphasis on collectivity, "a major aspect of black survival", is relevant in Caged Bird. McPherson agrees, although how Maya uses and defines community changes when she leaves Stamps, and continues to adapt later in her life, as she describes in the later volumes of her autobiographical story. Kinnamon, in his comparison of Caged Bird and Richard Wright's Black Boy, states that unlike Wright, whose response to the poverty and racism of his childhood is "individualistic alienation from all sense of community", Angelou's response is to embrace community. Kinnamon calls Caged Bird "a celebration of black culture". Also unlike Wright, Angelou recalls the larger rituals of black community, such as religious practices, the radio broadcast of the Joe Lewis fight, a summer fish fry, the telling of ghost stories, and graduation activities, favorably. McPherson states that Angelou uses community to demonstrate how Blacks survived racism; as McPherson puts it, "personal values become synonymous with Stamps' communal values". Liliane Arensberg insists that Angelou demonstrates how she, as a Black child, evolves out of her "racial hatred", common in the works of many contemporary Black novelists and autobiographers. McPherson states that Caged Bird describes centuries-long traditions, developed in Africa and during slavery, that taught Black children to never resist "the idea that whites were better, cleaner, or more intelligent than blacks". At first, Maya wishes that she could become white, since growing up Black in white America is dangerous; later she sheds her self-loathing and embraces a strong racial identity. Both Angelou's depiction of her community's reaction to the victorious Joe Louis fight and her elementary school graduation, in which they respond to a racist school official demeaning their future opportunities by singing "Lift Every Voice and Sing", demonstrate the strength and resiliency of her community.

=== Rape ===
Angelou's description of being raped as an eight-year-old child overwhelms the autobiography, although it is presented briefly in the text. Opal Moore calls Angelou's graphic and complicated depiction of rape and incest "the center and bottom" of the autobiography and states the rape must be understood within the context of the entire book; everything that happens to Maya in it "should be understood against the ravaging of rape". For Moore, the rape "raises issues of trust, truth, and lie, love, and the naturalness of a child's craving for human contact, language and understanding, and the confusion engendered by the power disparities that necessarily exist between children and adults". Angelou describes two sexual encounters with Mr. Freeman; she uses metaphors, which allow her to describe her pain without having to explain what and how she feels.

Scholar Mary Vermillion compares Angelou's treatment of rape in Caged Bird to Harriet Jacobs' in her 1861 autobiography, Incidents in the Life of a Slave Girl. According to Vermillion, one major difference between Angelou and Jacobs is the way somatophobia, which Vermillion defines as the "fear and disdain for the body", especially the female body, is depicted in their books. Angelou, for example, is freer to portray her rape, her body, and her sexuality than Jacobs because she does not have to deal with the 19th century patriarchal view of "true womanhood". Jacobs describes herself as beautiful and sexually desirable, but Angelou, as a child and young adult, thinks she is ugly. Jacobs and Angelou both use rape as a metaphor for the suffering of African Americans; Jacobs uses the metaphor to critique slaveholding culture, while Angelou uses it to first internalize, then challenge, 20th-century racist conceptions of the Black female body. Angelou connects her rape with the suffering of the poor and the subjection of her race and "represents the black girl's difficulties in controlling, understanding, and respecting both her body and her words". Vermillion also connects the violation of Maya's body to her self-imposed muteness because she believes that her lie during the trial is responsible for her rapist's death. McPherson evaluates the rape in Caged Bird in light of how it affected Maya's identity, and how her displacement from the dangerous but comfortable setting of Stamps to her mother's chaotic and unfamiliar world of St. Louis contributes to Maya's trauma and withdrawal into herself. Sondra O'Neale states, however, that the birth of Maya's son at the end of the book provides the reader with hope for her future and implies that the rape would not control her life.

It should be clear, however, that this portrayal of rape is hardly titillating or "pornographic." It raises issues of trust, truth and lies, love, the naturalness of a child's craving for human contact, language and understanding, and the confusion engendered by the power disparities that necessarily exist between children and adults.

— Opal Moore

Arensberg, who blames Maya's vulnerability on her previous experiences of neglect, abandonment, and lack of parental love, notes that Maya's rape is connected to the theme of death in Caged Bird, as Mr. Freeman threatens to kill Maya's brother Bailey if she tells anyone about the rape. After Maya lies during Freeman's trial, stating that the rape was the first time he touched her inappropriately, Freeman is murdered (presumably by one of Maya's uncles) and Maya sees her words as a bringer of death. As a result, she resolves never to speak to anyone other than Bailey. Angelou connects the violation of her body and the devaluation of her words through the depiction of her self-imposed, five-year-long silence. As Angelou later stated, "I thought if I spoke, my mouth would just issue out something that would kill people, randomly, so it was better not to talk". Christine Froula connects Maya's self-imposed muteness with Ovid's retelling of the Philomela rape myth, in which the victim's power of speech becomes a threat to the rapist and another victim of the rapist.

Selwyn R. Cudjoe calls Angelou's depiction of the rape "a burden" of Caged Bird: a demonstration of "the manner in which the Black female is violated in her tender years and ... the 'unnecessary insult' of Southern girlhood in her movement to adolescence". Vermillion goes further, maintaining that a Black woman who writes about her rape risks reinforcing negative stereotypes about her race and gender. When Joanne Braxton asked Angelou decades later how she was able to survive the trauma she experienced, Angelou explained it by stating, "I can't remember a time when I wasn't loved by somebody". She also told Braxton that she thought about the rape daily and that she wrote about the experience because it was the truth and because she wanted to demonstrate the complexities of rape for both the victim and the rapist. She also wanted to prevent it from happening to someone else and so that the rape victim might gain understanding, forgive herself, and not blame herself.

=== Literacy ===
Angelou has described William Shakespeare as a strong influence on her life and works, especially his identification with what she saw as marginalized people, stating that "Shakespeare was a black woman".

As Lupton points out, all of Angelou's autobiographies, especially Caged Bird and its immediate sequel Gather Together in My Name, are "very much concerned with what [Angelou] knew and how she learned it". Lupton compares Angelou's informal education with the education of other Black writers of the twentieth century, who did not earn official degrees and depended upon the "direct instruction of African American cultural forms". Angelou's quest for learning and literacy parallels "the central myth of black culture in America": that freedom and literacy are connected. As Fred Lee Hord puts it, "the book world was a world of integration, where you were the confidant of all the denizens—in whose skins, regardless of color, you could move inside and breathe free". Hord adds that Maya also rejected the part of her culture "that she associated with powerlessness in the world of book learning". For example, one of the most traumatic experiences Angelou relates in Caged Bird is her eighth-grade graduation, when the white commencement speaker denigrates Blacks, reduces their potential to athletics, and conveys to his audience a sense of impotence and nothingness. The anger and depression Maya feels changes when Henry Reed leads the audience and graduates in the Negro National Anthem, when Maya senses the pride and strength of her community. As Hord puts it, Maya realizes, for the first time, "how black writers not only made possible an alternative world, but pushed the boundaries outward in her actual world". Hord also states that the white speaker helped Maya demystify her ideas about the power of education for African Americans; the composer of the Anthem also provided her with the strength to resist the white speaker's dehumanization of her community.

Angelou states, early in Caged Bird, "During these years in Stamps, I met and fell in love with William Shakespeare. He was my first white love. Although I enjoyed and respected Kipling, Poe, Butler, Thackeray and Henley, I saved my young and loyal passion for Paul Lawrence Dunbar, Langston Hughes, James Weldon Johnson and W. E. B. DuBois' 'Litany at Atlanta.' But it was Shakespeare who said, 'When in disgrace with fortune and men's eyes.' It was a state with which I felt most familiar". As Hord states, Shakespeare identified with the state Maya, "a young castaway without parents in a freedom-stifling, small southern town", found herself in. Christine Froula, though, in her discussion about incest in Caged Bird and Alice Walker's The Color Purple, points out that Maya and Bailey gave up memorizing a scene from Shakespeare to avoid their grandmother's opposition to reading a white author, choosing Johnson's "The Creation" instead. Froula goes on to state that the vignette "raises the question of what it means for a female reader and fledging writer to carry on a love affair with Shakespeare or with male authors in general" and connects Maya's attraction to Shakespeare and his writings with Maya's rape described later on. Mary Vermillion sees a connection between Maya's rape and Shakespeare's The Rape of Lucrece, which Vermillion calls "Angelou's most complex and subtle examination of Maya's attachment to white literary discourse" and which Maya memorizes and recites when she regains her speech. Vermillion maintains that Maya's attachment to Lucrece indicates her attachment to the verbal and the literary, which leads her to ignore her corporeality and helps her find comfort in the poem's identification with suffering. As Vermillion states, Maya must use the words she memorizes and recites to reconstruct her own body. Froula says that although Maya's memorization of Lucrece helps her overcome her literal muteness, it ushers her into a literary recovery because it connects her voice to Shakespeare's words. Froula goes on to say, "But if Shakespeare's poem redeems Maya of her hysterical silence, it is also a lover she embraces at her peril" because it "signals a double seduction" of white and male culture. Braxton, however, explains Maya's connection with Shakespeare and with Dunbar, who influenced Angelou more than the other writers she names in Caged Bird, by stating that they "speak directly to her dilemma—the problem of developing a positive self-image in a culture whose standards of beauty are uniformly white, and the problem of finding a place for herself in that culture". Maya finds novels and their characters complete and meaningful, so she uses them to make sense of her bewildering world. She is so involved in her fantasy world of books that she even uses them as a way to cope with her rape, writing in Caged Bird, "...I was sure that any minute my mother or Bailey or the Green Hornet would bust in the door and save me".

According to Walker, the power of words is another theme that appears repeatedly in Caged Bird. For example, Maya chooses to not speak after her rape because she is afraid of the destructive power of words. Mrs. Flowers, by introducing her to classic literature and poetry, teaches her about the positive power of language and empowers Maya to speak again. Myra K. McMurray agrees, saying that Angelou uses art, even the artistic aspects of the Joe Lewis fight and of other instances, to demonstrate her community's survival instincts. The importance of both the spoken and written word appears repeatedly in Caged Bird and in all of Angelou's autobiographies. (Note: There are over 100 references to literary characters in Angelou's first six autobiographies.) Referring to the importance of literacy and methods of effective writing, Angelou once advised Oprah Winfrey in a 1993 interview to "do as West Africans do ... listen to the deep talk", or the "utterances existing beneath the obvious". As Liliane Arensberg puts it, "If there is one stable element in Angelou's youth it is [a] dependence upon books" and fiction, including The Lone Ranger, The Shadow, and Marvel Comics, and works by Shakespeare, Poe, Dunbar, Jane Austen, William Makepeace Thackeray, Samuel Johnson, Langston Hughes, and W. E. B. Du Bois. The public library is a "quiet refuge" to which Maya retreats when she experiences crisis. Novels and the characters in them became Maya's references for viewing and dealing with the world around her. Hagen describes Angelou as a "natural story-teller", which "reflect[s] a good listener with a rich oral heritage". Hagen also insists that Angelou's years of muteness provided her with this skill. Books and poetry, with Mrs. Flowers' help, become Maya's "first life line" and a way to cope with the trauma of her rape. First, Mrs. Flowers treats her as an individual, unconnected to another person, and then by encouraging Maya to memorize and recite poetry, gives her a "sense of power within herself, a transcendence over her immediate environment". Mrs. Flowers' friendship awakens Maya's conscience, increases her perspective of what is around her and of the relationship between Black culture and the larger society, and teaches her about "the beauty and power of language". Their friendship also inspires Maya to begin writing poetry and record her observations of the world around her.

Angelou was also influenced by slave narratives, spirituals, and other autobiographies. Angelou read through the Bible twice as a young child, and memorized many passages from it. African American spirituality, as represented by Angelou's grandmother, has influenced all of Angelou's writings, in the activities of the church community she first experiences in Stamps, in the sermons and public addresses, and in scripture. Angelou told an interviewer in 1981 that the Bible and the language spoken at church was crucial to her development as a writer, likening it to going to the opera. Hagen says that in addition to being influenced by rich literary form, Angelou has also been influenced by oral traditions. In Caged Bird, Mrs. Flowers encourages her to listen carefully to "Mother Wit", which Hagen defines as the collective wisdom of the African American community as expressed in folklore and humor. (Note: Hagen, in his analysis of Caged Bird, lists all the folk stories and jokes Angelou refers to and uses in the book.) Arensberg states that Angelou uses the literary technique of wit, humor, and irony to defeat her enemies by mocking them and using her adult narrative voice. In tis way, Angelou "retaliates for the tongue-tied child's helpful pain". Arensberg goes on to state that Angelou even ridicules the child version of herself, although unlike other autobiographers, she avoids linking the child she was to the adult she became. As Vermillion states, Angelou reembodies Maya following the trauma of her rape by critiquing her early dependency on white literary discourse, even though Angelou "is not content to let the mute, sexually abused, wishing-to-be-white Maya represent the black female body in her text".

Angelou's humor in Caged Bird and in all her autobiographies is drawn from Black folklore and is used to demonstrate that in spite of severe racism and oppression, Black people thrive and are, as Hagen states, "a community of song and laughter and courage". According to Selwyn R. Cudjoe, although life is difficult for the individuals in Caged Bird, moments of happiness are not absent in the book. He compares Caged Bird to Thomas Hardy's The Mayor of Casterbridge, but states that "such moments came...as 'the occasional episodes(s) in a general drama of pain'". Hagen states that Angelou is able to make an indictment of institutionalized racism as she laughs at her flaws and the flaws of her community and "balances stories of black endurance of oppression against white myths and misperceptions". Hagen also characterizes Caged Bird as a "blues genre autobiography" because it uses elements of blues music. These elements include the act of testimony when speaking of one's life and struggles, ironic understatement, and the use of natural metaphors, rhythms, and intonations. Hagen also sees elements of African American sermonizing in Caged Bird. Angelou's use of African-American oral traditions create a sense of community in her readers, and identifies those who belong to it. The vignettes in Caged Bird feature literary aspects such as oral story traditions and traditional religious beliefs and practices that depict African American cultural life. For example, the story about Maya's racist employer Mrs. Cullinan parallels traditional African American folklore, the significance, horror, and danger accompanied by the importance of naming in traditional society, and the practice of depriving slaves of their true names and cultural past.

== Reception and legacy ==
=== Critical reception and sales ===
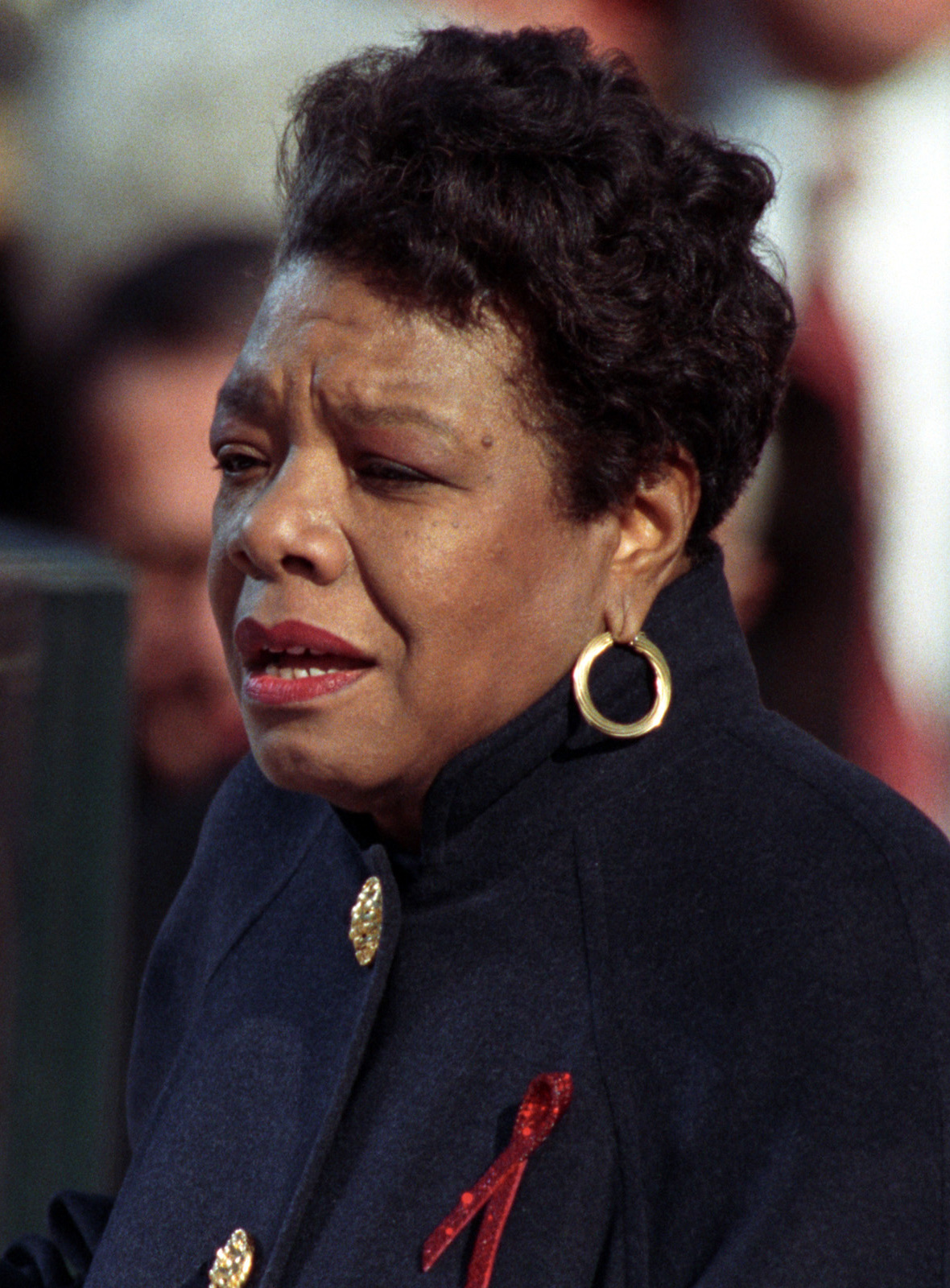
Angelou during her recitation of her poem, "On the Pulse of Morning", during President Bill Clinton's 1993 inauguration.

I Know Why the Caged Bird Sings is the most highly acclaimed of Angelou's autobiographies. It became a bestseller immediately after it was published. Angelou's friend and mentor, James Baldwin, maintained that her book "liberates the reader into life" and called it "a Biblical study of life in the midst of death". According to Angelou's biographers, "Readers, especially women, and in particular Black women, took the book to heart". By the mid-1980s, Caged Bird had gone through 20 hardback printings and 32 paperback printings. The week after Angelou recited her poem "On the Pulse of Morning" at President Bill Clinton's 1993 inauguration, sales of the paperback version of Caged Bird, which had sold steadily since its publication, and her other works rose by 300–600 percent. The 16-page publication of "On the Pulse of Morning" became a bestseller, and the recording of the poem was awarded a Grammy Award. The Bantam Books edition of Caged Bird was a bestseller for 36 weeks; 400,000 copies of her books were reprinted to meet demand. Random House, which published Angelou's hardcover books and the poem later that year, reported that they sold more of her books in January 1993 than they did in all of 1992, marking a 1,200 percent increase.

By the end of 1969, critics had placed Angelou in the tradition of other Black autobiographers. Poet James Bertolino asserts that Caged Bird "is one of the essential books produced by our culture". He insists that "[w]e should all read it, especially our children". It was nominated for a National Book Award in 1970, has never been out of print, and has been published in many languages. It has been a Book of the Month Club selection and an Ebony Book Club selection. In 2011, Time Magazine placed the book in its list of 100 best and most influential books written in English since 1923. Caged Bird catapulted Angelou to international fame and critical acclaim and was a significant development in Black women's literature because it "heralded the success of other now prominent writers".

The book's reception has not been universally positive; author Francine Prose, who calls Caged Bird a "survival memoir," or "a first-person narrative of victimization and recovery", considers its inclusion, along with books like Harper Lee's To Kill a Mockingbird, in the high school curriculum as partly responsible for the "dumbing down" of American society. Prose calls the book "manipulative melodrama", and considers Angelou's writing style an inferior example of poetic prose in memoir. She faults Angelou with poor writing, including combining a dozen metaphors in one paragraph and "obscuring ideas that could be expressed so much more simply and felicitously".

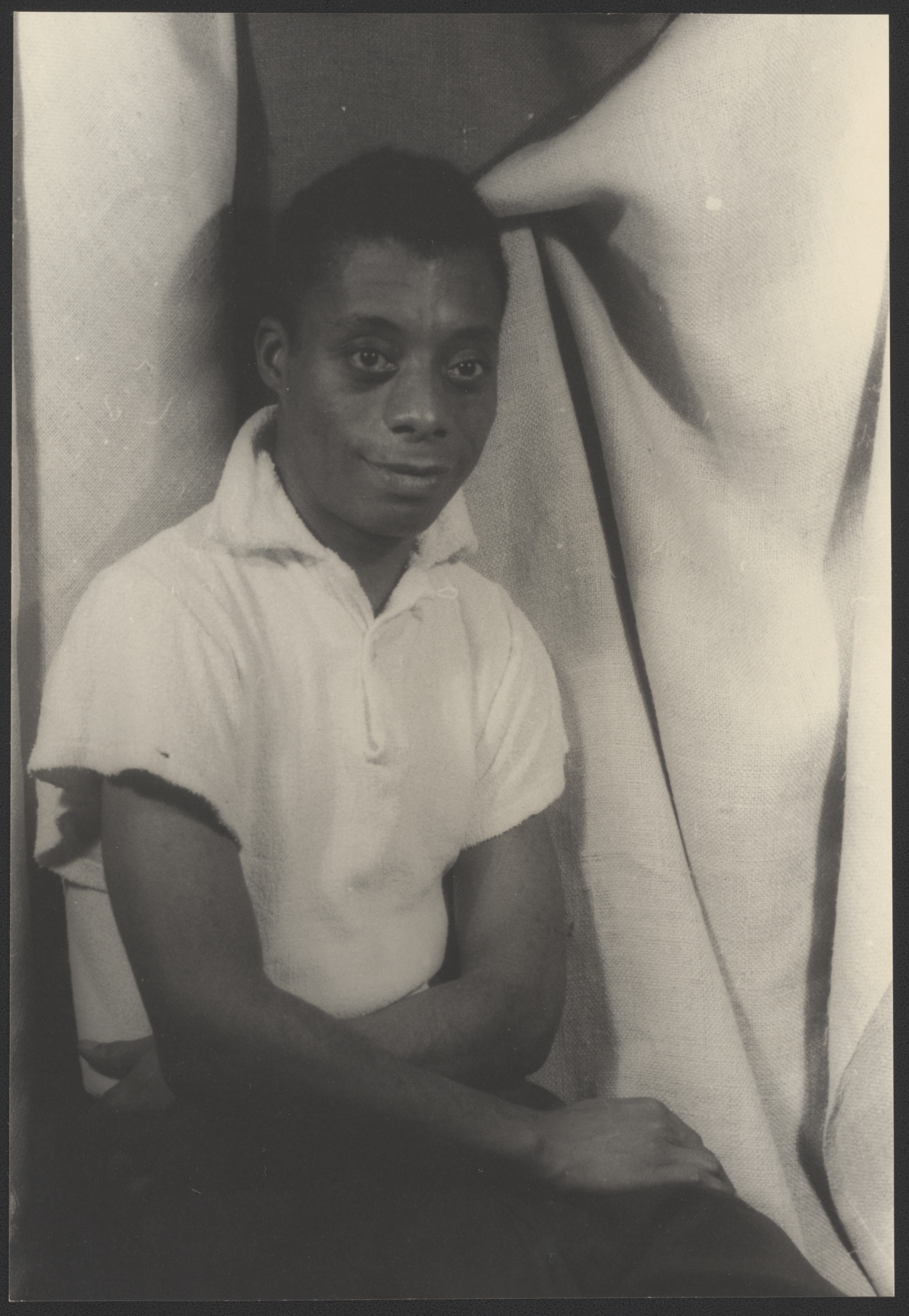
James Baldwin (1955), Angelou's friend and mentor, called Caged Bird "a Biblical study of life in the midst of death".

Susan Gilbert calls Caged Bird "a story of hurt, and loneliness, and anger, and love" and Robert A. Gross calls the book "a tour de force of language". Other reviewers have praised Angelou's use of language in the book, including E. M. Guiney, who reports that Caged Bird was "one of the best autobiographies of its kind that I have read". Edmund Fuller insists that Angelou's intellectual range and artistry were apparent in how she told her story and Selwyn R. Cudjoe calls it "a triumph of truth in simple, forthright terms". R. A. Gross praises Angelou for her use of rich and dazzling images and Dolly McPherson praises Angelou for describing "a life lived with intensity, honesty, and a remarkable combination of innocence and knowledge". McPherson, who calls Angelou "an accomplished writer", calls the book "a carefully conceived record of a young girl's slow and clumsy growth" and "a record of her initiation into her world and her discovery of her interior identity". She goes on to praise Angelou for confronting her own painful past while recognizing that the painful events in her life "form a necessary part of her development". McPherson also states that Angelou uses her narrative gifts and use of language to confidently and effectively describe her painful memories, while understanding that "events are not only significant in themselves, but because they mark points of transcendence". Harold Bloom calls Caged Bird "more a carol than it is a prayer or plea" and Sidonie Ann Smith states that Angelou's "genius as a writer is her ability to recapture the texture of the way of life in the texture of its idioms, its idiosyncratic vocabulary and especially in its process of image-making".

Opal Moore, in her criticism of the push to ban Caged Bird from schools, states that the book's message of overcoming racism transcends its author and that the book "is an affirmation; it promises that life, if we have the courage to live it, will be worth the struggle". Liliane Arensberg states that like all autobiographies, Caged Bird "seems a conscious defense against the pain felt at evoking unpleasant memories". Mary Jane Lupton compares Angelou's works with Richard Wright's two-volume serial autobiographies, stating that Angelou's transitions between her volumes are smoother than Wright's and that her presentation of herself as a character is more consistent. Lupton also compares Angelou's autobiographies with Dust Tracks on a Road (1942) by Zora Neale Hurston, Coming of Age in Mississippi (1968) by Anne Moody, Report From Part One (1972) by Gwendolyn Brooks, Bone Black: Memories of Girlhood (1996) by bell hooks, and Lilian Hellman's series of four autobiographies. McPherson says that Angelou's serial autobiographies, along with other contemporary autobiographies written by Baldwin, Moody, and Malcolm X, "is the urge to articulate, as if for the first time, a sensibility at once determined and precluded by history".

=== Influence ===
When Caged Bird was published in 1969, Angelou was hailed as a new kind of memoirist, one of the first African-American women who was able to publicly discuss her personal life. Up to that point, Black women writers were marginalized to the point that they were unable to present themselves as central characters. Julian Mayfield, who calls Caged Bird "a work of art that eludes description", has insisted that Angelou's autobiographies set a precedent for African American autobiography as a whole. Hilton Als insists that Caged Bird marked one of the first times that a Black autobiographer could, as he put it, "write about blackness from the inside, without apology or defense". After writing Caged Bird, Angelou became recognized as a respected spokesperson for Blacks and women. Caged Bird made her "without a doubt ... America's most visible black woman autobiographer". Although Als considers Caged Bird an important contribution to the increase of Black feminist writings in the 1970s, he attributes its success less to its originality than to "its resonance in the prevailing Zeitgeist" of its time, at the end of the American Civil Rights Movement. Angelou's writings, more interested in self-revelation than in politics or feminism, freed many other women writers to "open themselves up without shame to the eyes of the world".

Opal Moore has called for better preparation for teachers who use Caged Bird in their classrooms, stating that the book is a difficult text for both teachers and students. Angelou's autobiographies, especially Caged Bird, have been used in narrative and multicultural approaches to teacher education. Jocelyn A. Glazier, a professor at George Washington University, has used Caged Bird and Gather Together in My Name when training teachers to appropriately explore racism in their classrooms. Angelou's use of understatement, self-mockery, humor, and irony causes readers to wonder what she "left out" and to be unsure how to respond to the events Angelou describes. These techniques force white readers to explore their feelings about race and their privileged status in society. Glazier found that although critics have focused on where Angelou fits within the genre of African American autobiography and her literary techniques, readers react to her storytelling with "surprise, particularly when [they] enter the text with certain expectations about the genre of autobiography".

Educator Daniel Challener, in his 1997 book Stories of Resilience in Childhood, analyzed the events in Caged Bird to illustrate resiliency in children. Challener states that Angelou's book provides a useful framework for exploring the obstacles many children like Maya face and how a community helps these children succeed as Angelou did. Psychologist Chris Boyatzis has used Caged Bird to supplement scientific theory and research in the instruction of child development topics such as the development of self-concept and self-esteem, ego resilience, industry versus inferiority, effects of abuse, parenting styles, sibling and friendship relations, gender issues, cognitive development, puberty, and identity formation in adolescence. He has called Caged Bird a highly effective tool for providing real-life examples of these psychological concepts.

=== Censorship ===
Caged Bird elicits criticism for its honest depiction of rape, its exploration of the ugly specter of racism in America, its recounting of the circumstances of Angelou's own out-of-wedlock teen pregnancy, and its humorous poking at the foibles of the institutional church.

— Opal Moore

Caged Bird has been criticized by many parents, causing it to be removed from school curricula and library shelves. The book was approved to be taught in public schools and was placed in public school libraries through the U.S. in the early-1980s, and was included in Advanced Placement and gifted student curriculum. Attempts by parents to censor it began in 1983. Some have been critical of its sexually explicit scenes, use of language, and irreverent religious depictions. Many parents throughout the U.S. have sought to ban the book from schools and libraries for being inappropriate for younger high school students, for promoting premarital sex, homosexuality, cohabitation, and pornography, and for not supporting traditional values. Parents have also objected to the book's use of profanity and to its graphic and violent depiction of rape and racism. Educators have responded to these challenges by removing it from reading lists and libraries, by providing students with alternatives, and by requiring parental permission from students. In 2009, Angelou expressed her sorrow and outrage about the banning of all her books, stating that those who insisted upon banning them had not read them. She also said, “I feel sorry for the young person who never gets to read [Caged Bird]".

In 2021, the Thurgood Marshall Civil Rights Center, which stated that banning books like Caged Bird and The Color Purple by Alice Walker "points to a larger pattern of banning books significant to African American history and culture". They found that Caged Bird was banned in prisons throughout the U.S.; for example, the book was banned in North Carolina prisons because officials determined that its depiction of sexual assault was a security threat.

In 2023, the book was banned, in Clay County District Schools, Florida.

Caged Bird appeared third on the American Library Association (ALA) list of the 100 Most Frequently Challenged Books of 1990–2000, sixth on the ALA's 2000–2009 list, and fell to 88th place on the ALA's 2010–2019 list. (Note: The ALA did not track data about banned books before 1990.) As of 1998, it was one of the ten books most frequently banned from high school and junior high school libraries and classrooms.

In April of 2025, the United States Naval Academy's library removed Caged Bird and 380 more books "after Defense Secretary Pete Hegseth's office ordered the school to get rid of ones that promote diversity, equity and inclusion."

=== Film version ===
A made-for-TV movie version of I Know Why the Caged Bird Sings was filmed in Mississippi and aired on April 28, 1979, on CBS. Angelou and Leonora Thuna wrote the teleplay; the movie was directed by Fielder Cook. Constance Good played young Maya. Also appearing were actors Esther Rolle, Roger E. Mosley, Diahann Carroll, Ruby Dee, and Madge Sinclair. Two scenes in the movie differed from events described in the book. Angelou added a scene between Maya and Uncle Willie after the Joe Louis fight; in it, he expresses his feelings of redemption and hope after Louis defeats a white opponent. Angelou and Thuna also present Maya's eighth grade graduation differently in the film. In the book, Henry Reed delivers the valedictory speech and leads the Black audience in the Negro national anthem. In the movie, Maya conducts these activities.

== Sources cited ==
- Angelou, Maya (1969). I Know Why the Caged Bird Sings. New York: Random House. ISBN 978-0-375-50789-2.
- Arensberg, Liliane K. (1999). "Death as Metaphor for Self". In Braxton, Joanne M. (ed.). Maya Angelou's I Know Why the Caged Bird Sings: A Casebook. Oxford Press. pp. 111–128. ISBN 0-19-511606-2.
- Baisnée, Valérie (1994). Gendered Resistance: The Autobiographies of Simone de Beauvoir, Maya Angelou, Janet Frame and Marguerite Duras. Amsterdam: Rodopi. ISBN 90-420-0109-7.
- "Banning the Caged Bird: Prison Censorship Across America" (PDF). Thurgood Marshall Civil Rights Center. Washington, D.C.: Howard University School of Law. 2021.
- Bertolino, James (1996). "Maya Angelou is Three Writers". In Bloom, Harold (ed.). Modern Critical Interpretations: Maya Angelou's I Know Why the Caged Bird Sings. New York: Chelsea House Publishers. ISBN 0-7910-4773-3.
- Bertolino, James (1993). "Maya Angelou is Three Writers". In Karolides, Nicholas J.; Burress, Lee; Kean, John M. (eds.). Censored Books, Critical Viewpoints. Scarecrow Press. pp. 299–305. ISBN 0-8108-2667-4.
- Braxton, Joanne M. (1998). "A Song of Transcendence: Maya Angelou". In Bloom, Harold (ed.). Maya Angelou's I Know Why the Caged Bird Sings. Philadelphia: Chelsea House Publishers. pp. 93–110. ISBN 0791047733.
- Braxton, Joanne M. (1999). "Symbolic Geography and Psychic Landscapes: A Conversation with Maya Angelou". In Braxton, Joanne M. (ed.). Maya Angelou's I Know Why the Caged Bird Sings: A Casebook. New York: Oxford Press. pp. 3–20. ISBN 0-19-511606-2.
- Braxton, Joanne M. (2004). "Black Autobiography". In Bloom, Harold (ed.). Maya Angelou's I Know Why the Caged Bird Sings. Philadelphia: Chelsea House Publishers. pp. 63–64. ISBN 0-7910-7562-1.
- Burgher, Mary (1979). "Images of Self and Race in the Autobiographies of Black Women". In Bell, Roseann P.; Parker, Bettye J.; Guy-Sheftall, Beverly (eds.). Sturdy Black Bridges: Visions of Black Women in Literature. Garden City, New York: Doubleday. ISBN 0-385-13347-2.
- Cudjoe, Selwyn R. (1984). "Maya Angelou and the Autobiographical Statement". In Evans, Mari (ed.). Black Women Writers (1950–1980): A Critical Evaluation. Garden City, New York: Doubleday. pp. 6–24. ISBN 0-385-17124-2.
- Cullinan, Bernice E. & Diane Goetz Person, eds. "Angelou, Maya". In The Continuum Encyclopedia of Children's Literature. Continuum International Publishing Group (2003). ISBN 0-8264-1778-7.
- Foerstel, Herbert N. (2002). Banned in the U.S.: A Reference Guide to Book Censorship in Schools and Public Libraries. Westport, Connecticut: Greenwood Press. ISBN 1-59311-374-9.
- Gilbert, Susan (1998). "Maya Angelou's I Know Why the Caged Bird Sings: Paths to Escape". In Bloom, Harold (ed.). Maya Angelou's I Know Why the Caged Bird Sings. Philadelphia: Chelsea House Publishers. pp. 81–91. ISBN 0791047733.
- Gillespie, Marcia Ann; Butler, Rosa Johnson; Long, Richard A. (2008). Maya Angelou: A Glorious Celebration. New York: Random House. ISBN 978-0-385-51108-7.
- Hagen, Lyman B. (1997). Heart of a Woman, Mind of a Writer, and Soul of a Poet: A Critical Analysis of the Writings of Maya Angelou. Lanham, Maryland: University Press. ISBN 0-7618-0621-0.
- Hord, Fred Lee (1998). "Someplace to Be a Black Girl". In Bloom, Harold (ed.). Maya Angelou's I Know Why the Caged Bird Sings. Philadelphia: Chelsea House Publishers. pp. 141–151. ISBN 0791047733.
- Kent, George E. (1998). "Maya Angelou's I Know Why the Caged Bird Sings and Black Autobiographical Tradition". In Bloom, Harold (ed.). Maya Angelou's I Know Why the Caged Bird Sings. Philadelphia: Chelsea House Publishers. pp. 15–24. ISBN 0791047733.
- King, Debra Walker (1998). Deep Talk: Reading African American Literary Names. Charlottesville: University Press of Virginia. ISBN 0-8139-1852-9.
- Kinnamon, Keneth (1998). "Call and Response: Intertextuality in Two Autobiographical Works by Richard Wright and Maya Angelou". In Bloom, Harold (ed.). Maya Angelou's I Know Why the Caged Bird Sings. Philadelphia: Chelsea House Publishers. pp. 69–79. ISBN 0791047733.
- Lauret, Maria (1994). Liberating Literature: Feminist Fiction in America. New York: Routledge. ISBN 0-415-06515-1.
- Lupton, Mary Jane (1998). Maya Angelou: A Critical Companion. Westport, Connecticut: Greenwood Press. ISBN 0-313-30325-8.
- Froula, Christine (Summer 1986). "The Daughter's Seduction: Sexual Violence and Literary History". Signs. 11 (4): 621–644. doi:10.1086/494269. ISSN 0097-9740. JSTOR 3174136.
- McMurray, Myra K. (1998). "Role Playing as Art in Maya Angelou's 'Caged Bird'". In Bloom, Harold (ed.). Maya Angelou's I Know Why the Caged Bird Sings. Philadelphia: Chelsea House Publishers. pp. 25–30. ISBN 0791047733.
- McPherson, Dolly A. (1990). Order out of Chaos: The Autobiographical Works of Maya Angelou. New York: Peter Lang Publishing. ISBN 0-8204-1139-6.
- McPherson, Dolly A. (1999). "Initiation and Self Discovery". In Braxton, Joanne M. (ed.). Maya Angelou's I Know Why the Caged Bird Sings: A Casebook. Oxford Press. pp. 21–48. ISBN 0-19-511606-2.
- Moore, Opal (1999). "Learning to Live: When the Bird Breaks from the Cage". In Braxton, Joanne M. (ed.). Maya Angelou's I Know Why the Caged Bird Sings: A Casebook. New York: Oxford Press. pp. 49–58. ISBN 0-19-511606-2.
- O'Neale, Sondra (1984). "Reconstruction of the Composite Self: New Images of Black Women in Maya Angelou's Continuing Autobiography". In Evans, Mari (ed.). Black Women Writers (1950–1980): A Critical Evaluation. Garden City, New York: Doubleday. pp. 25–36. ISBN 0-385-17124-2.
- Smith, Sidonie Ann (1998). "The Song of a Caged Bird: Maya Angelou's Quest after Self-Acceptance". In Bloom, Harold (ed.). Maya Angelou's I Know Why the Caged Bird Sings. Philadelphia: Chelsea House Publishers. pp. 3–13. ISBN 0791047733 – via Internet Archive.
- Tate, Claudia (1999). "Maya Angelou: An Interview". In Braxton, Joanne M. (ed.). Maya Angelou's I Know Why the Caged Bird Sings: A Casebook. New York: Oxford Press. pp. 149–158. ISBN 0-19-511606-2.
- Vermillion, Mary (1999). "Reembodying the Self: Representations of Rape in Incidents in the Life of a Slave Girl and I Know Why the Caged Bird Sings". In Braxton, Joanne M. (ed.). Maya Angelou's I Know Why the Caged Bird Sings: A Casebook. New York: Oxford Press. pp. 59–76. ISBN 0-19-511606-2.
- Walker, Pierre A. (2009). "Racial Protest, Identity, Words, and Form in Maya Angelou's I Know Why the Caged Bird Sings". In Harold Bloom (ed.). Bloom's Modern Critical Views: Maya Angelou (New ed.). Infobase Publishing. pp. 17–36. ISBN 978-1-60413-177-2.
