= Pearlena Lewis =

Civil rights activist

Pearlena Lewis (November 25, 1953 – July 2001) was an American civil rights activist and participant at the Jackson Woolworth sit-in during the civil rights movement.

== Early life ==
Pearlena Lewis was the oldest of seven siblings. She was raised by her father, Clarence E. Lewis, a minister, and her mother, Margaret Tucker, in the segregated South.

Lewis explained that segregation made her feel as if something were wrong with her as a child. Her father helped her learn about the segregation in a way that taught her to not feel hurt or insufficient, but to realize it was wrong and to do something about it. As her father continued moving up in ministry, Lewis' family joined what was known as the "black middle class".

However, Lewis continued to feel the pain of inadequacy. She recalls, "On T.V., all of the commercials were white. In the magazines you saw white. All the models were white. Everything seemed to be saying 'white is right'."

She was heavily involved in the church, and though she did not agree, she was considered a leader and role model in school. It was hard for Lewis to find work. Her father forbade her and her sisters to work as a domestic for a white family, because he did not trust the white men.

== Sit-in ==
In her senior year of high school, Lewis met Medgar Evers at a church service. He recruited her to the National Association for the Advancement of Colored People (NAACP) North Jackson Youth Council. Before agreeing, Lewis researched the Council thoroughly. Lewis and her friend Corlia Liddell both decided to join. Lidell was elected president of the youth council, and Lewis was elected vice president.

Because Lewis was from Jackson, Evers agreed for her to participate in the Woolworth's sit-in. They held strategy sessions a week before the event, during which they planned their transportation and media messages. Lewis stated, "We were just tired of sitting around and listening to adults say, 'Let's try this; let's try that.' I thought we had waited long enough." As a distraction from the sit-in, picketing started at J. C. Penneys.

Lewis partnered with two other black students – Memphis Norman and Anne Moody – and John Salter, Jr., a white professor, during the event. They each had strategic timing for when they would enter, and where they should sit. Another (white) student from Tougaloo, Joan Trumpauer (now Mulholland) stood outside as a look-out for any counter-protesters, and later took a seat at the counter; Lois Chaffee, a white faculty member at Tougaloo, also sat at the counter.

Though they were refused service, they remained sitting in the white section of the restaurant. Verbal abuse began, including racial slurs. Verbal abuse escalated to physical fighting. Sugar, salt, ketchup, mustard, and anything else on the counter, were poured over their heads and smeared on their bodies. Lewis was pulled from her chair to the ground, but she fought her way back into her seat. Moody and Lois were also pulled from their seats. Norman was knocked to the ground by a punch to his face, and once on the floor, was kicked repeatedly in the face. Salter received a cigarette burn on the back of his neck, he was hit in the jaw with brass knuckles, and a pepper water mix was thrown into his eyes. Mulholland started to fear for their lives just before things started to draw to a close. The sit-in ended at about 2:00 p.m. when the president of Tougaloo College got a hold of the National Office of Woolworth, who advised the store manager to shut the store down.

An undercover policeman arrested Norman and one of his attackers, former police officer Benny Oliver (who had been kicking Norman in the face), but would not escort the participants outside, although the shop was surrounded by an angry crowd, so the president of Tougaloo College, Dr. A. D. Beittel, arrived and led the protestors out of the establishment.

The sit-in participants ultimately returned to NAACP headquarters. Later that night, people came together to plan and organize more demonstrations. This event started the Jackson movement to stand up and fight back.

Bill Minor, then the Mississippi correspondent covering civil rights events for the New Orleans Times-Picayune and who was there that day, says the Jackson Woolworth's sit-in was "the signature event of the protest movement in Jackson. The first one there was with real violence." The following year, the Civil Rights Act of 1964 was passed into law.

== Legacy ==
Lewis was known as a natural leader. Before Evers died, he asked her to continue the Jackson movement. He believed strongly in her spirit and strength.

== Death ==
Lewis died in July, 2001. She is recognized as a strong figure in the NAACP and for her work in Jackson.

== See also ==
- Sit-in movement
