= Coming of Age in Mississippi =

Autobiography by Anne Moody

- Author: Anne Moody
- Language: English
- Genre: Memoir
- Publication date: 1968
- Publication place: United States

Coming of Age in Mississippi is a 1968 memoir by Anne Moody about growing up in rural Mississippi in the mid-20th century as an African-American woman. The book covers Moody's life from childhood through her mid twenties, including her involvement in the Civil Rights Movement beginning when she was a student at the historically black Tougaloo College. Moody's autobiography details her struggles both against racism among white people and sexism among her fellow civil rights activists. It received many positive reviews and won awards from the National Library Association and the National Council of Christians and Jews. On October 13, 2023 Anne Moody was posthumously inducted into the Tougaloo College National Alumni Association Hall of Fame at a banquet ceremony held in Jackson, Mississippi.

== About the author ==
Anne Moody, born Essie Mae Moody, was born September 15, 1940, in Centreville, Mississippi. The daughter of two poor sharecroppers and the eldest of many, Moody took on a great responsibility at a young age and matured quickly. After graduating high school in 1959, Moody received a basketball scholarship to Natchez Junior College and later transferred to Tougaloo College. Moody became involved early in the Civil Rights Movement, helping organize the Congress of Racial Equality (CORE) and participating in a Woolworth's sit-in on May 28, 1963. After graduation from Tougaloo College, Moody moved to Ithaca, New York, where she was coordinator of the civil rights training project at Cornell University until 1965. She moved to New York City once she left Cornell, where she began writing Coming of Age in Mississippi, which was published in 1968. She married Austin Straus in 1967, with whom she had one son, Sascha Straus. After struggling with dementia for years, she died at her home in Gloster, Mississippi, on February 5, 2015, aged 74.

== Structure and content ==
Coming of Age in Mississippi is divided into four sections: "Childhood," "High School," "College," and "The Movement."

=== Part One: Childhood ===
Moody begins her story on the plantation where she lives with her mother Toosweet and her father Diddly, both sharecroppers, and her younger sister, Adline.

Later, Moody's mother gives birth to her third child, Jr. While Toosweet is pregnant with Jr., her father begins an affair with another woman from the plantation. Shortly after Jr.'s birth, her parents separate.

Moody moves with her mother and younger siblings to town to live with her great-aunt and begins grade school. Moody's curiosity about race is sparked when her questions about her two uncles, who appear white, go unanswered. Moody's mother begins a relationship with a man named Raymond, whom she eventually marries and has five more children with by the time Moody is in college.

At nine years old, Moody begins her first job sweeping a porch, earning seventy-five cents a week and two gallons of milk. She experiences her first real competition with Raymond's sister Darlene; they're the same age and in the same class, constantly competing against one another whenever possible.

Though Moody enjoys attending Centreville church, which Raymond's family belongs to, she is tricked into joining her mother's church: Mt. Pleasant. She resents her mother for some time after that.

Once the family farm falls through, Moody takes on more responsibility to help support the family. When asked to obtain a copy of her birth certificate for graduation, her birth certificate shows up as Annie Mae. When Toosweet requests to have it changed, she is told there would be a fee; Moody asks if she can keep Annie, and so she becomes Annie Mae Moody.

=== Part Two: High School ===
Moody's political awakenings begin during her teenage years, chronicled in the book's second section, "High School." During her first year in high school, Emmett Till, an innocent 14-year-old black boy visiting Mississippi from Chicago, is tortured and murdered for allegedly whistling in a flirtatious and offensive manner at a white woman. His murder is a defining moment in Moody's life. When Moody asks her mother questions about why the boy was killed and by whom, she is told, "an Evil Spirit killed him;" and that "it would take eight years to learn what that spirit was." For the first time, she realizes the extent to which many whites in Mississippi will go to protect their way of life — white supremacy — and the appalling powerlessness of the blacks — what most whites considered savages. When she asks her mother for the meaning of "NAACP" (referring to the National Association for the Advancement of Colored People), after hearing it from Mrs. Burke, the white woman she works for, her mother tells her never to mention that word in front of any white person, and, if possible, not at all. Shortly thereafter, Moody discovers that there is one adult in her life who could offer her the answers she seeks: Mrs. Rice, her homeroom teacher. Mrs. Rice plays a pivotal role in Moody's maturation. She not only answers Moody's questions about Emmett Till and the NAACP, but she volunteers a great deal more information about the state of race relations in Mississippi. Moody's early curiosity about the NAACP resurfaces later when she attends Tougaloo College. It is during this time, at fifteen years old, that Moody makes the claim that she began to hate white people. She also moves to Baton Rouge that same summer. While in Baton Rouge, Moody learns some tough lessons when she is ripped off by a white family for two weeks' pay, and when she is betrayed by a co-worker, which resulted in her losing her job. Working for Mrs. Burke was something Moody viewed as a challenge; one that she overcame when she quit after Mrs. Burke wrongfully accused her younger brother, Jr. When Moody returned to New Orleans the following summer she worked as a waitress and was able to save money for college. Moody graduated high school in the summer of 1959 and made the decision to return to New Orleans for good.

=== Part Three: College ===
The third section of the autobiography reveals Moody's increasing commitment to political activism. Towards the end of the summer after graduation, Moody received a letter from the head coach at Natchez Junior College; she had received a basketball scholarship. Attending Natchez felt very restrictive to Moody, and at the end of the year she was unsure if she would return, but because of the cost of the schools in New Orleans, she returned to Natchez in the fall. During her second year at Natchez College, she helps organize a successful boycott of the campus cafeteria when a student finds a maggot in her plate of grits. This is Moody's first experience in organizing a group of individuals to launch a structured revolt against the practices of an established institution. While waiting for their demands to be met, Moody offers up what little money she has to help buy food for her fellow students. Just before the end of her sophomore year at Natchez, Moody successfully applies for an academic scholarship to Tougaloo College. When Moody's roommate Trotter encourages her to join the NAACP, of which she is the secretary, Moody promises she will attend the next meeting, despite the animosity and violence that had surrounded everything she knew about the group. Some Tougaloo students were jailed after a demonstration, and when they were brought back to campus, Medgar Evers accompanied them to "get some of Tougaloo's spirit and try and spread it around all over Jackson." Though Moody's grades suffered, she could not pull herself away from the movement. A white student, Joan Trumpauer, a secretary for SNCC, the Student Nonviolent Coordinating Committee, moved across the hall from Moody and invited her to help canvass in the voter registration they were organizing in the Delta. While a junior at Tougaloo College, Moody joins the NAACP. The third section ends with Moody's recounting of a terrifying ordeal in Jackson, Mississippi. On a shopping trip there with Rose, a fellow student from Tougaloo College, Moody – without any planning or support mechanism in place – decides to go into the "Whites Only" section of the Trailways bus depot. Initially the whites in the waiting area react with shock, but soon a menacing white mob gathers around the two young women and threatens violence.

=== Part Four: The Movement ===
The fourth and final section documents Moody's full-scale involvement in the struggle for civil rights. In the opening chapter of the final section, Moody narrates her participation in a sit-in at a Woolworth's lunch counter in Jackson. She and three other civil rights workers – two of them white – take their seats at the lunch counter. They are denied service, but the four continue to sit and wait. Soon a large number of white students from a local high school pour into Woolworth’s. When the students realize that a sit-in is in progress, they crowd around Moody and her companions and begin to taunt them. The verbal abuse quickly turns physical. Moody, along with the other three, is beaten, kicked, and "dragged about thirty feet toward the door by [her] hair." Then all four of them are "smeared with ketchup, mustard, sugar, pies and everything on the counter." The abuse continues for almost three hours until Dr. Adam Beittel, the president of Tougaloo College who arrived after being informed of the violence, rescues them. When Moody is escorted out of Woolworth's by Dr. Beittel, she realizes that "about ninety white police officers had been standing outside the store; they had been watching the whole thing through the windows, but had not come in to stop the mob or do anything." This experience helps Moody understand "how sick Mississippi whites were" and how "their disease, an incurable disease," could prompt them even to kill to preserve "the segregated Southern way of life." While Moody is working for CORE, she slowly becomes angry; angry that she is not seeing the change she had hoped for, in the time she had hoped for, and angry that so many black people refused to work as diligently as herself and her activist peers did. Moody experiences the most fear throughout the entire story during this time when she learns she has made the Klan list. In the chapters that follow she comments on the impact of the assassinations of Medgar Evers and President John F. Kennedy on the Civil Rights Movement, and the escalating turmoil across the South. Just before the final chapter, along with her fellow "Woolworth orphans," Moody graduates from Tougaloo College. The short final chapter ends with her joining a busload of civil rights workers on their way to Washington, D.C. As the bus moves through the Mississippi landscape, her fellow travelers sing the anthem of the Movement.
