= John Hunter Gray =

US sociologist and activist (1934–2019)

John Hunter Gray (born John Salter Jr., February 14, 1934 – January 7, 2019) was a sociologist, professor and an American activist and community organizer in the civil rights movement. He was best known for his participation in the 1963 Jackson, Mississippi Woolworth's department store's lunch counter sit-in. The iconic photo of Gray and Tougaloo College students earned Gray national attention and the nickname "Mustard Man" when a group of whites poured sugar, ketchup and mustard over his head during the sit-in.

On May 28, 1963, in Jackson, Mississippi, Gray joined white and black Tougaloo College students in a sit-in at the Woolworth's lunch counter to protest segregation. Tougaloo students included white student Joan Trumpauer and black student Anne Moody who sat at the front counter instead of at the segregated section for black citizens and requested service. Gray, a professor at the college, joined the students sitting at the counter and was viciously attacked by a white mob who struck him with brass knuckles and broken glass. In Anne Moody's autobiography, Coming Of Age In Mississippi, she said that once Gray sat down he was immediately hit by brass knuckles and with blood gushing from his face salt was thrown into his open wounds.

Shortly after the Jackson sit-in, during a protest march, Gray was severely beaten unconscious and taken to a fairgrounds where demonstrators were held. Gray was also involved in a suspicious car accident where he and a chaplain sustained serious injuries. He was often followed by the local police and also under surveillance by the FBI who had compiled thousands of pages about him and his activities.

Grays' act of defiance and the Jackson sit-in greatly aided the Civil Rights Movement. Just two weeks after the Jackson sit-ins, on June 11, President John F. Kennedy publicly called for a national civil rights bill. The Civil Rights Act of 1964 was signed a year later by President Lyndon B. Johnson.

== Early life ==
John Hunter Gray was born John Randall Salter Jr. in Chicago, Illinois, on February 14, 1934. Commonly perceived as white, Salter, as he was formerly known, changed his name to John Hunter Gray to honor his Native American heritage. He grew up in Flagstaff, Arizona with his Native American father who was an artist and a college professor and his mother, a teacher. After graduating high school in 1951, Gray joined the United States Army for a short time before attending Arizona State University. After his military service Salter became a member of the Industrial Workers of the World. He remained a member for six years. He graduated in 1958 with his undergraduate degree in social studies. He attained his master's degree in sociology two years later. While pursuing his degrees at Arizona State University, Gray organized and volunteered for many student groups including the International Mine, Mill and Smelter Workers. In 1961, Gray and his wife, Eldri Johanson, were married. The two met while Eldri was a social worker in Duluth, Minnesota. She herself being from Moose Lake, Minnesota, and had graduated from Augsburg College with a degree in sociology. She stayed loyally to her husbands side, traveling with him to fight in the Civil Rights Movement together. After marriage the couple moved to Jackson, Mississippi. During an interview later in life he told Loki Mulholland, filmmaker and son of Joan Trumpauer, that "We decided to go south because things were happening".

== Career and activism ==
Gray played a large role in the civil rights movement in Mississippi. His home became an unofficial headquarters for civil rights activists. While Gray was a sociology professor at Tougaloo College he became very involved with the NAACP, and grew close with Medgar Evers, who was the NAACP field secretary. In addition to the Jackson sit-in, he taught tactics of nonviolence, organized an NAACP youth council, and conducted a study of poverty in Mississippi as well. While involved in civil rights activities in Mississippi, Gray was monitored by the Mississippi Sovereignty Commission.

After leaving Mississippi, Gray moved to many other states where he continued his civil rights activities and teaching. In North Carolina he worked on voting rights and for the Southern Conference Educational Fund. He also did human rights work in Chicago serving as director of the Chicago Commons Association from 1969 to 1973. From 1976 to 1978 he served as director of the Office of Human Development of the Catholic Diocese of Rochester, New York. From 1978 he taught sociology at many colleges around the country including the University of North Dakota, Grand Forks, and Navajo Community College, Tsaile, Arizona. Gray also held teaching positions at the University of Iowa; Goddard College in Plainfield, Vermont; Superior State College in Wisconsin; and Coe College in Cedar Rapids, Iowa. Gray worked from 1981 to 1994 at the University of North Dakota as a professor and was a chair in the American Indian Studies Department. In 1988, Gray recalled, without hypnotic regression techniques, that both he and his son were abducted by aliens, an experience he personally viewed as positive insofar as he considered the intentions of his captors as beneficent. He retired from the University of North Dakota in 1994 and moved to Pocatello, Idaho where he continued his involvement in civil rights activities.

== Death ==
Gray died of natural causes on January 7, 2019, at the age of 84, at his home in Pocatello, Idaho. He is survived by two sons and two daughters.
