= Natchez Junior College =

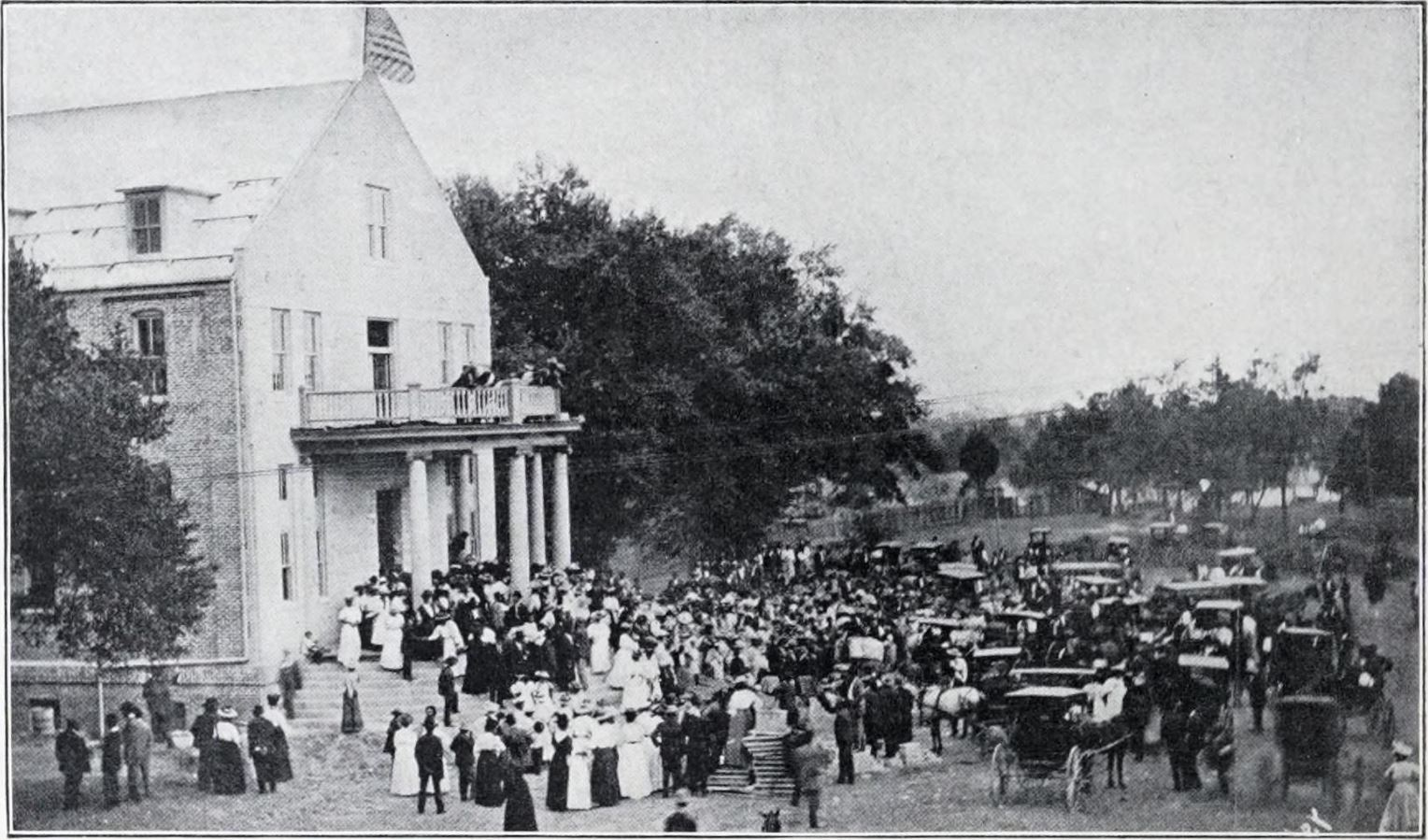
Booker T. Washington at Natchez College, October 7, 1908

Natchez Junior College, formerly Natchez College, was a private historically black college and later junior college opened in 1884 and closed in 1989, located in Natchez, Mississippi, United States.

Natchez College was formed in 1884 by an effort of the Baptist State Missionary Convention led by George W. Gayles. The school was initially called Natchez College and stopped giving bachelor's degrees and became a junior college in the 1960s.

== List of presidents ==
- J. R. Buck (1904)
- Samuel Henry Clay Owen (1910–1929)

== List of alumni ==
- Eugene P. Booze (1879–1939), businessman
- Lloyd Tevis Miller (1872–1951), physician
- Anne Moody (1940–2015), writer, civil rights activist
- James Alexander Owen (1891–1955), physician and politician
