= Joan Trumpauer Mulholland =

American civil rights activist (born 1941)

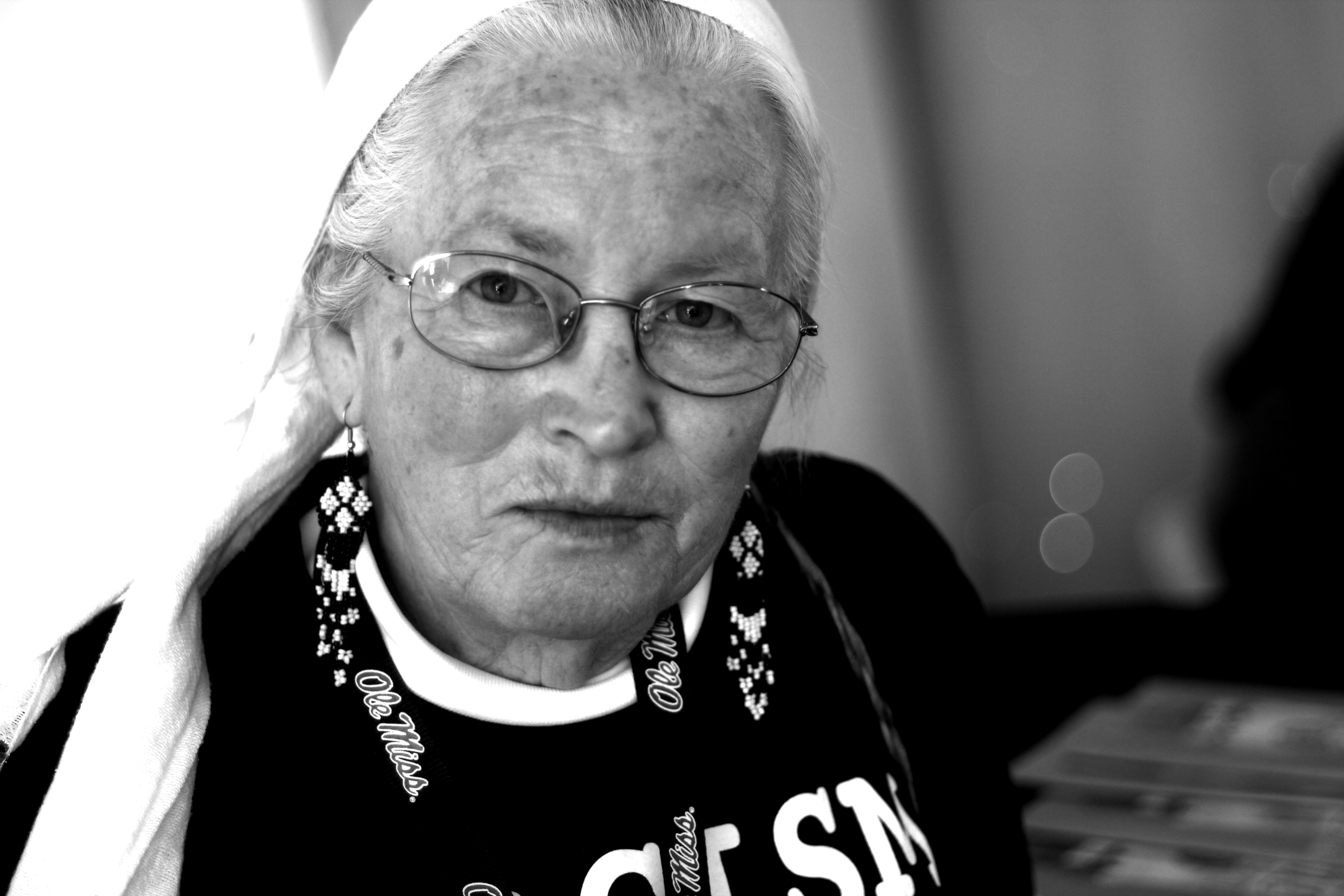
- Mulholland in 2013
- Born: Joan Trumpauer; September 14, 1941 (age 84); Washington, D.C., U.S.
- Education: Duke University; Tougaloo College
- Known for: Freedom Riders
- Children: 5

Joan Trumpauer Mulholland (born September 14, 1941) is an American civil rights activist who was active in the 1960s. She was one of the Freedom Riders who was arrested in Jackson, Mississippi, in 1961, and was confined for two months in the Maximum Security Unit of the Mississippi State Penitentiary (known as "Parchman Farm"). The following year she was the first white student to enroll at Tougaloo College in Jackson, Mississippi, and served as the local secretary of the Student Nonviolent Coordinating Committee (SNCC).

She later worked as a teacher, and after her retirement she established the Joan Trumpauer Mulholland Foundation. The foundation is dedicated to educating youth about the Civil Rights Movement and how to become activists in their communities.

== Early life ==
Joan Mulholland, born as Joan Trumpauer in Washington, D.C., was raised in nearby Arlington, Virginia.

Her great-grandparents were slave owners in Georgia, and after the United States Civil War, they became sharecroppers. Her mother was the first in her family to marry a "Yankee". Both of her parents had government jobs.

Mulholland regularly attended a Presbyterian church and Sunday school. She practiced memorizing verses as well, such as: "In as much as you have done it unto one of the least of these, my brethren, you have done it unto me;" "do unto others as you would have them do unto you, for such is the Kingdom of God." The morality she was taught at church was in direct contrast to the segregation around her and the hatred her parents espoused.

Mulholland later recalled an occasion that forever changed her perspective, when visiting her family in Georgia during the summer. Mulholland and her childhood friend Mary dared each other to walk into a "nigger" town, which was located on the other side of the train tracks. Mulholland stated the experience opened her eyes: "No one said anything to me, but the way they shrunk back and became invisible, showed me that they believed that they weren't as good as me."

At the age of 10, Mulholland began to recognize the economic divide between the races. At that moment, she vowed to herself that if she could do anything to help be a part of the Civil Rights Movement and change the world, she would.

Her desire for activism created tension and a divide between her and her mother. She had planned to attend a small church university in Ohio or Kentucky, but her mother would not allow it out of fear of integration. Instead, her mother insisted she apply to Duke University in Durham, North Carolina, where she was accepted. Mulholland attended Duke University for a year before she decided to drop out, in search of a greater meaning in her life. Having nowhere to go, she obtained menial jobs while putting efforts towards the Nonviolent Action Group from Howard University.

== Activism ==
Duke University had separate campuses for men and women. In the first and second week of school, women rushed and pledged for sororities. Mulholland and her roommate were uninterested and instead went to a different event held by the International Club. This behavior was unusual for Duke and the university sent a counselor to visit the girls to see if they were unhappy.

In the spring of 1960, Mulholland participated in her first of many sit-ins. Her civil rights activism was not understood, being a white, southern woman. She was branded as mentally ill and was taken in for testing after her first arrest. Out of fear of shakedowns, Mulholland wore a skirt with a deep, ruffled hem where she would hide paper that she had crumpled until it was soft and then folded neatly. With the paper, Mulholland was able to write about her experiences as a diary that still exists. In this diary, she explains what they were given to eat and how they sang almost all night long. She even mentioned the segregation in the jail cells and stated, "I think all the girls in here are gems, but I feel more in common with the Negro girls & wish I was locked in with them instead of these atheist Yankees."

She has stated she got a lot of support from the faculty at Duke University, but not from the administration. She dropped out of university in the fall, after being pressured by the Dean of Women to stop her activism.

=== Freedom Riders and prison ===
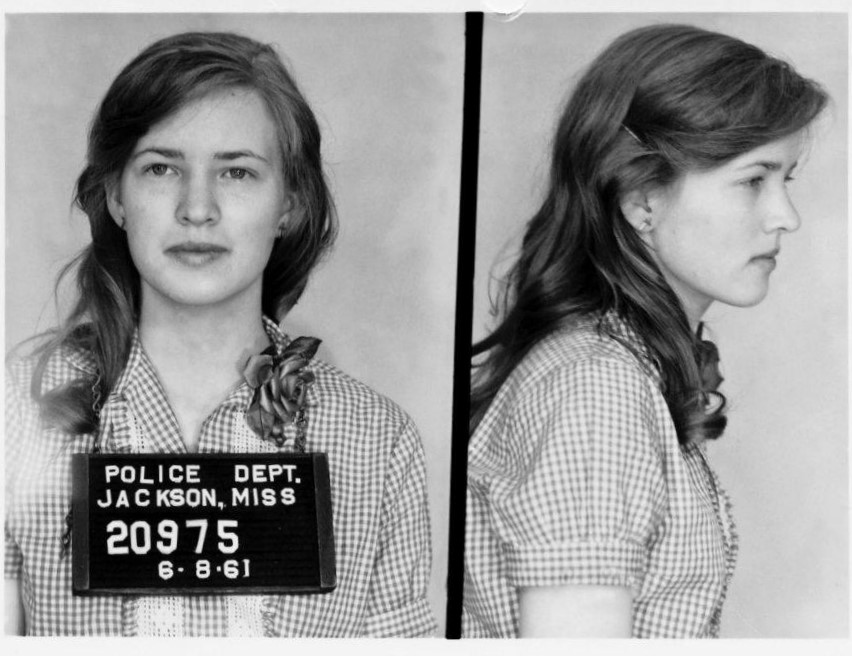
Joan Trumpauer (Mulholland), Jackson Mississippi, 1961

In the summer of 1961, the historic Freedom Riders, a group of black and white activists, challenged the legally segregated buses and bus stations of the south by refusing to travel separately. Thirteen riders left on two Greyhound buses en route to New Orleans from Washington, D.C.

Anniston, Alabama was the most dangerous of the towns the riders stopped in. On Mother's Day, the two buses arrived in Anniston and were set on fire. Churchgoers and their children were reportedly watching as the riders attempted to escape the flames of the bus, only to be beaten by the townspeople until the police stopped the chaos. After this event, many believed they had seen the end of the Freedom Rides. Instead, a call was made to Mulholland in D.C. and to Diane Nash to ask for more riders.

Mulholland, along with Stokely Carmichael (the activist and later SNCC chairman, who would later be known as Kwame Ture), Hank Thomas, and many others, took a different freedom ride. The group took a plane to New Orleans, then rode on the Illinois Central train to Jackson, Mississippi, with members of the Congress of Racial Equality.

After the new group of Freedom Riders were arrested for refusing to leave a bus waiting area in Jackson, Mulholland and others were put inside a paddy wagon and taken to Parchman Penitentiary in Mississippi, a jail in the Delta, not far from where Emmett Till had been murdered in 1955. This prison had a reputation for violence, and several inmates had disappeared. At the time, in June 1961, Mulholland was 19, and she refused to pay bail.

On the ride there, the driver stopped at a house in rural Mississippi. Mulholland and the other activists reportedly began to fear for their lives. In retrospect, Mulholland later recounted, the driver had probably needed a pit stop and wanted only to frighten the riders.

When they arrived at Parchman, the women were issued coarse, black-and-white striped denim skirts and t-shirts. Before being locked in cells, the women were stripped and each subjected to a vaginal examination. The matron cleansed her gloved hand, before each exam, in a bucket of liquid that Mulholland said smelled like Lysol. In prison, Mulholland was segregated from her fellow Nonviolent Action Group (NAG) friends. She described the experience as isolating, with everyone unaware of what was going on.

They were housed on death row for two months. "We were in a segregated cell with 17 women and 3 square feet (0.27 square meters) of floor space for each of us," she recalled in 2014.

Many of the freedom riders remained behind bars for about a month, but Mulholland had no plans and no place to go until school opened in the fall. She served her two-month sentence and additional time to work off the US$200 (equivalent to $2,155 in 2025) fine she owed. Each day in prison took three dollars off the fine.

=== Tougaloo College ===
Soon after Mulholland's release, Charlayne Hunter and Hamilton E. Holmes became the first African-American students to enroll at the University of Georgia. One night, an angry mob gathered outside Hunter's dormitory, causing significant property damage and gaining media attention for the university and the state. After the riots, even previously pro-segregation officials condemned the rioters. Mulholland thought, "Now if whites were going to riot when black students were going to white schools, what were they going to do if a white student went to a black school?" She then enrolled in Tougaloo College in Jackson, where she had the opportunity to meet Medgar Evers, Martin Luther King Jr., Rev. Ed King, and Anne Moody.

When Dr. Martin Luther King Jr. came to Tougaloo College to give a speech, it was Mulholland who escorted him to the science building where he was to speak. Mulholland states that King was the hero of the movement, but many often got frustrated with him for preaching all of the time. Two years later, Mulholland was accepted into Delta Sigma Theta sorority.

Mulholland has stated that, during her attendance at Tougaloo College, crosses were occasionally burned on campus. Several of the local authorities were worried that something might happen between her—a white woman—and one of the black men. There were various attempts to shut down Tougaloo but the school remained open because its charter predated the Jim Crow laws.

She received many letters scolding or threatening her while she was attending Tougaloo. Her parents later tried to reconcile with their daughter, and they bribed her with a trip to Europe. She accepted their offer and went with them during summer vacation. Shortly after they returned, however, she went straight back to Tougaloo College.

=== Jackson Woolworth's sit-in ===
Mulholland participated in the May 28, 1963 sit-in to protest racial segregation at the lunch counter of the Woolworth’s store in downtown Jackson. She was one of 14 activists, including fellow Tougaloo student Anne Moody, professor John Salter, and white Tougaloo chaplain Ed King. The activists were beaten, smeared with condiments, and berated. The crowd yelled at the students, screaming the phrase "communist" at them constantly. One man pointed out of the crowd to Mulholland, calling her a "white nigger".

Around the time Mulholland arrived at Woolworth's, Tougaloo student Memphis Norman had been dragged to the floor by former police officer Benny Oliver, who wore tennis shoes, and was being kicked repeatedly. The assault continued until an undercover police officer arrested both Norman and Oliver. Moody and Pearlena Lewis were both later pulled from their seats. Moody had been thrown against the counter. Around this time, Mulholland noticed a man walk past Moody with a knife and called out, "Annie, he's got a knife." She then walked to the counter and sat down next to Moody and Lewis. People started to yell slurs such as "traitor," "communist," "black bitch," and "white nigger." Mulholland was lifted by her waist by one man and Moody was lifted from her stool by two high school boys. Both girls were dragged out of the store by their hair.

Mulholland's assailant was arrested outside and she was allowed to go free. She returned to the lunch counter with Moody. At that moment, there were two whites and two blacks, all female. Soon, Salter arrived, joining the two women at the counter. The crowd grew more violent. Salter received a cigarette burn on the back of his neck, he was hit in the jaw with brass knuckles, and a pepper–water mix was thrown into his eyes. Mulholland started to fear for their lives just before things started to draw to a close. The sit-in ended at about 2 p.m. when the president of Tougaloo College contacted the National Office of Woolworth’s, which advised the store manager to shut the store down.

Bill Minor, then the Mississippi correspondent covering civil rights events for the New Orleans Times-Picayune and who was there that day, says the Jackson Woolworth's sit-in was "the signature event of the protest movement in Jackson, the first one with real violence."

=== March on Washington for Jobs and Freedom ===
On August 28, 1963, Mulholland attended the March on Washington for Jobs and Freedom. She rode to Washington, D.C., with Moody, Ed King, and his wife. On their return, the group stopped in a federal park in Tennessee, where they spent the night. The next morning, Moody and Mulholland woke before the Kings and went to the bathroom, where they found showers. They used showers one at a time and, having forgotten towels, used the paper towels in the bathroom to dry each other off. The women were discovered in the bathroom as two white women walked in, disturbed by Moody and Mulholland's actions. Moody and Mulholland returned to the now awake Kings, told them the story, and were quickly rushed from the park. Moody recalled seeing a group of white women come into view and watch just as the integrated car drove away.

=== 16th Street Baptist Church bombing ===
After the August 28, 1963, March on Washington, the Ku Klux Klan (KKK) set off a bomb on September 15 at the 16th Street Baptist Church in Birmingham, Alabama, just before Sunday morning service. The bomb injured 15 people and killed four children. Mulholland took a piece of glass from the explosion, glued it to black ebony wood, and fashioned a necklace out of it. She also carried a piece of the glass in her wallet for years, feeling it every time she reached for her change.

=== Michael Schwerner ===
Mulholland gave Michael and Rita Schwerner an orientation on what to know about being a white activist in the state of Mississippi. The next day, June 21, 1964, Michael was killed, along with James Chaney and Andrew Goodman. Mulholland explained that she is aware that nothing she could have added in the information she gave Schwerner would have prevented what had happened.

== Later career ==
Mulholland later worked at the Smithsonian Institution, the United States Department of Commerce, and the Justice Department, before teaching English as a second language.

== Personal life ==
Joan Mulholland is retired and lives in Virginia. Due to her actions as an activist participating in at least three dozen sit-ins, not only was she disowned by her family, but she was also hunted by the Klan. Mulholland's mother believed she had been "sucked up into a cult", while her father was ultimately concerned about her safety.

She married Dan Mulholland, separated in 1975, and divorced in 1980, but lived only a block away from each other in Arlington. In a December 2019 interview with The Bulletin newspaper, Dan Mulholland said: "The kids were with me all weekend, and I had one of the kids over every Wednesday, 'cause with five kids, you seldom get one-on-one time with them."

== Legacy ==
In the PBS documentary Freedom Riders (airdate May 16, 2011), Mulholland is featured as one of 40 former college students from across the United States who embarked on a bus ride from Washington, D.C., to New Orleans, on May 6–16, 2011, retracing the original route of the Freedom Riders. In her interview for Freedom Riders, she recalls the harrowing conditions at Parchman.

== See also ==
- Sit-in movement
