= Anne Moody =

American civil rights activist and writer (1940–2015)

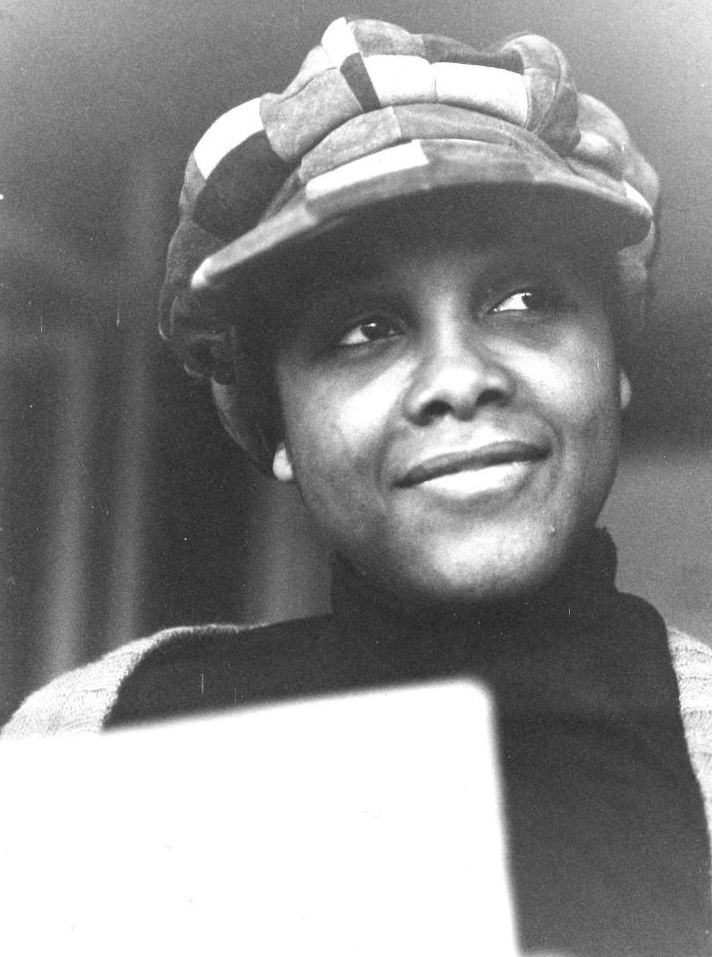
- Moody in the 1970s
- Born: Essie Mae Moody; September 15, 1940; Mississippi, U.S.
- Died: February 5, 2015 (aged 74); Gloster, Mississippi, U.S.
- Education: Natchez Junior College; Tougaloo College
- Occupation: Author
- Known for: Civil rights activism
- Notable work: Coming of Age in Mississippi (1968)

Anne Moody (September 15, 1940 – February 5, 2015) was an American author who wrote about her experiences growing up poor and black in rural Mississippi, and her involvement in the Civil Rights Movement through the NAACP, CORE and SNCC. Moody began fighting racism and segregation as a young girl growing up in Centreville, Mississippi.

== Life ==
Moody, born Essie Mae Moody on September 15, 1940, was the oldest of eight children. After her parents split up when she was five or six years old, she grew up with her mother, Elmira aka Toosweet, in Centreville, Mississippi, while her father, Diddly, lived with his new wife, Emma, in nearby Woodville. At a young age Moody began working for white families in the area, cleaning their houses and helping their children with homework for only a few dollars a week, while earning perfect grades in school and helping at Mount Pleasant church. After graduating with honors from a segregated, all-black high school, she attended Natchez Junior College (also all-black) in 1961 on a basketball scholarship.

Moody then moved on to Tougaloo College on an academic scholarship to earn a bachelor's degree. She became involved with the Congress of Racial Equality (CORE), National Association for the Advancement of Colored People (NAACP), and Student Nonviolent Coordinating Committee (SNCC). After graduation, Moody became a full-time worker in the civil rights movement, participating in a variety of different protests such as marches and sit-ins. Moody participated in a sit-in at a Woolworth's lunch counter in Jackson, when a mob attacked her, fellow student Joan Trumpauer, and Tougaloo professor John Salter, Jr. (later known as John Hunter Gray). The mob continuously poured flour, salt, sugar, and mustard on them, as depicted in a Jackson Daily News photograph. Two weeks after the sit-in, Mississippi NAACP leader Medgar Evers was assassinated outside his family home in Jackson. Anne Moody was arrested in Jackson, Mississippi for attempting to protest inside of a post office with 13 others, including Joan Trumpauer, Doris Erskine, Jeanette King, and Lois Chaffee.

In the 1960s, Moody went "underground," moving to New York where she lived quietly for decades. She stipulated that she would not be a part of any interviews during this time. It was in New York where Anne Moody wrote Coming of Age in Mississippi. During her quiet time she worked a number of non-writing jobs. Anne Moody wrote her second book, Mr. Death: Four Stories, in 1975. Mr. Death contains a series of short stories aimed at teaching young people about dying.

During Freedom Summer (1964), Moody worked for CORE in the town of Canton, Mississippi. In 1967, she married Austin Strauss, a Jewish man who was an NYU graduate student. In 1971, she gave birth to her son Sasha Strauss. In 1972, her family moved to Berlin after receiving a full-time scholarship, and they remained there until 1974 when they returned to America. Upon her return, she wrote a sequel to her autobiography, entitled Farewell to Too Sweet, which covered her life from 1974 to 1984, and in a 1985 interview with Debra Spencer she spoke of writing other books of memoirs, all of which remain unpublished. Moody was also involved in the anti-nuclear movement. She resettled in Mississippi in the early 1990s, though never felt at ease there, according to her sister Adline Moody.

== Death ==
On February 5, 2015, Moody died at her home in Gloster, Mississippi, at the age of 74, under the care of her younger sister Adline Moody. Moody suffered from dementia in her later years.

== Autobiography ==
Moody's autobiography, Coming of Age in Mississippi (1968), was acclaimed by Senator Edward Kennedy for its "powerful and moving" portrayal of life for a young African American before and during the Civil Rights Movement of the 1960s. Her perspective on life in rural Mississippi reveals the small and large violent acts encountered regularly by numerous African-American southerners, especially women. Moody grew up in a household where her mother would suppress any idea of questioning the way things were or the concept of segregation.

== Post-1968 ==
In 1969, Coming of Age in Mississippi received the Brotherhood Award from the National Council of Christians and Jews, and the Best Book of the Year Award from the National Library Association. In 1972, Moody worked as an artist-in-residence in Berlin. She went on to work at Cornell and in 1975, released a collection of short stories entitled Mr. Death: Four Stories. One of the stories, New Hope for the Seventies, won the silver award from Mademoiselle magazine.

She and Austin Straus divorced in 1977. Moody declined to make public appearances or grant interviews, with one exception: the above-mentioned interview with Debra Spencer, in 1985. Moody was absent from the spotlight during and after the civil rights movement, partly because she needed time to heal from the physical and psychological wounds received during those efforts. She lived in New York City, worked as a counselor for the New York City Poverty Program, and had been working on a book, The Clay Gully, prior to her death.

== Books ==
- Coming of Age in Mississippi. New York: Dial Press. 1968. (Delta reprint, 2004, ISBN 978-0385337816). (non-fiction, autobiography)
- Mr. Death: Four Stories. New York: Harper & Row. 1975. ISBN 978-0060243111.
