= List of Maya Angelou works =

The works of Maya Angelou encompass autobiography, plays, poetry, and teleplays. She also had an active directing, acting, and speaking career. She is best known for her books, including her series of seven autobiographies, starting with the critically acclaimed I Know Why the Caged Bird Sings (1969).

All my work, my life, everything I do is about survival, not just bare, awful, plodding survival, but survival with grace and faith. While one may encounter many defeats, one must not be defeated.

— Maya Angelou

Angelou's autobiographies are distinct in style and narration, and "stretch over time and place", from Arkansas to Africa and back to the US. They take place from the beginnings of World War II to the assassination of Martin Luther King Jr. Angelou wrote collections of essays, including Wouldn't Take Nothing for My Journey Now (1993) and Even the Stars Look Lonesome (1997), which writer Hilton Als called her "wisdom books" and "homilies strung together with autobiographical texts". Angelou used the same editor throughout her writing career, Robert Loomis, an executive editor at Random House, until he retired in 2011. Angelou said regarding Loomis: "We have a relationship that's kind of famous among publishers."

She earned various honors and awards, as well as more than 30 honorary degrees. As a poet, her volume Just Give Me a Cool Drink of Water 'fore I Diiie (1971) was nominated for the Pulitzer Prize, and she was chosen by President Bill Clinton to recite her poem "On the Pulse of Morning" during his inauguration in 1993.

Angelou's successful acting career included roles in numerous plays, films, and television programs, such as in the television mini-series Roots in 1977. Her screenplay Georgia, Georgia (1972) was the first original film script by a black woman to be produced. and she was the first African-American woman to direct a major motion picture, Down in the Delta, in 1998. Since the 1990s, Angelou participated in the lecture circuit, which she continued into her eighties.

== Literature ==
Unless otherwise stated, the items in this list are from Gillespie et al., pp. 186–191.

=== Autobiographies ===
- I Know Why the Caged Bird Sings (1969). New York: Random House. ISBN 978-0-375-50789-2
- Gather Together in My Name (1974). New York: Random House. ISBN 978-0-394-48692-5
- Singin' and Swingin' and Gettin' Merry Like Christmas (1976). New York: Random House. ISBN 978-0-679-45777-0
- The Heart of a Woman (1981). New York: Random House. ISBN 978-0-8129-8032-5
- All God's Children Need Traveling Shoes (1986). New York: Random House. ISBN 978-0-679-73404-8
- A Song Flung Up to Heaven (2002). New York: Random House. ISBN 978-0-375-50747-2
- I Know Why the Caged Bird Sings: The Collected Autobiographies of Maya Angelou (2004). New York: Modern Library. ISBN 978-0-679-64325-8
- Mom & Me & Mom (2013). New York: Random House. ISBN 978-1-4000-6611-7

=== Poetry ===
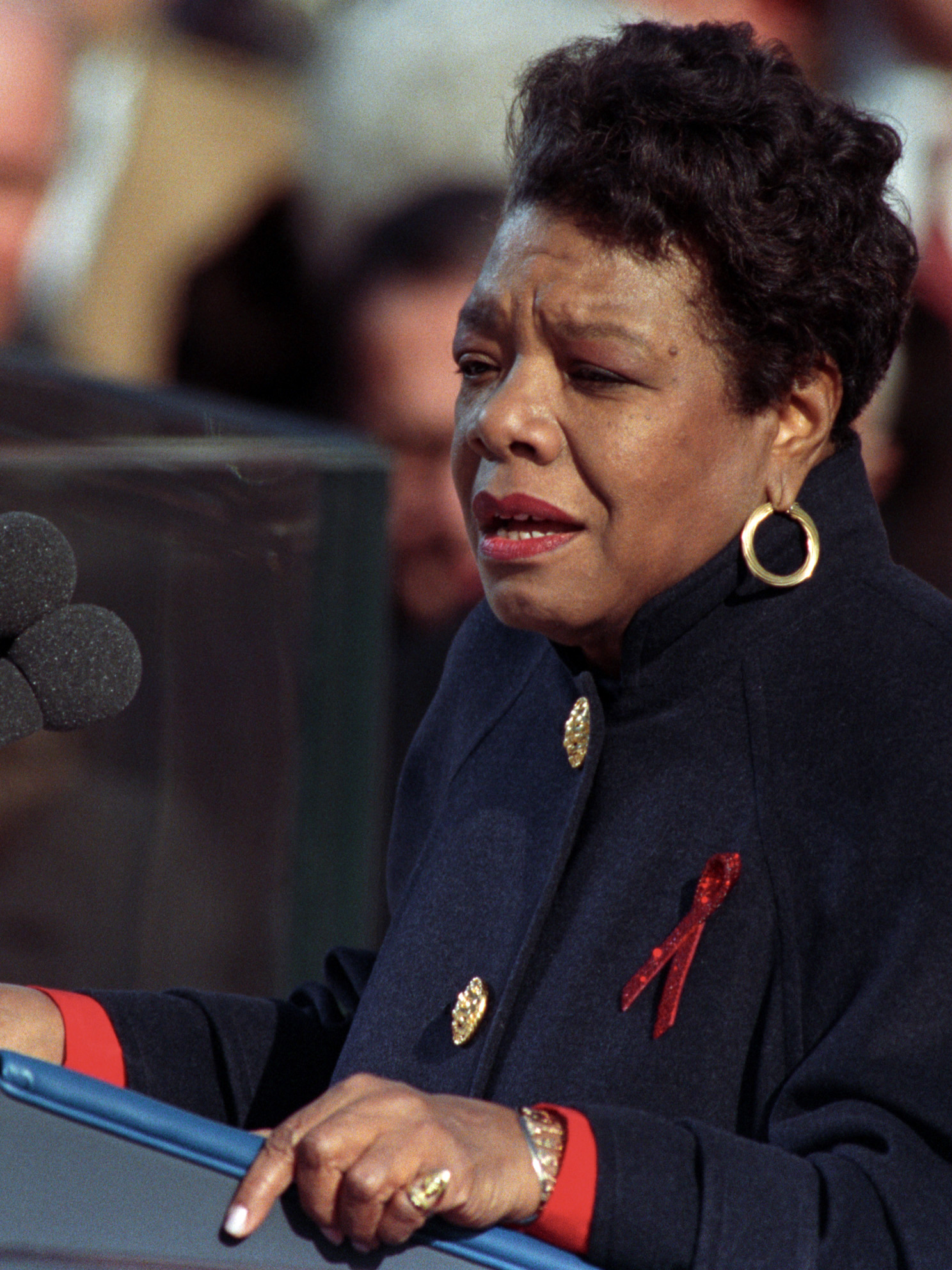
Angelou reciting "On the Pulse of Morning" at Bill Clinton's presidential inauguration in 1993

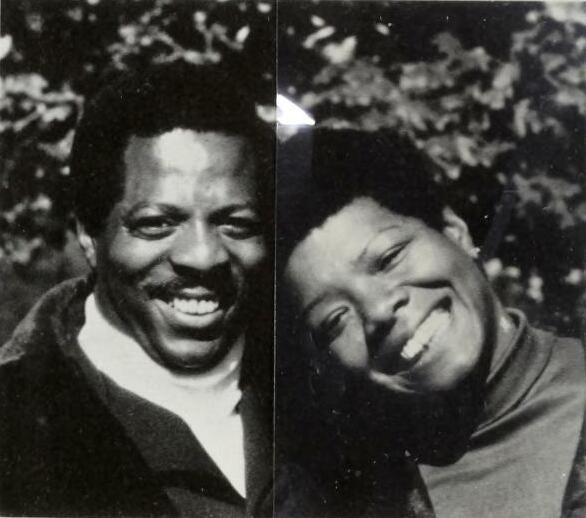
Angelou with Tom Feelings, who illustrated Now Sheba Sings the Song (1987).

- Just Give Me a Cool Drink of Water 'fore I Diiie (1971). New York: Random House. ISBN 978-0-394-47142-6
- Oh Pray My Wings Are Gonna Fit Me Well (1975). New York: Random House. ISBN 978-0-679-45707-7
- And Still I Rise (1978). New York: Random House. ISBN 978-0-394-50252-6
- Shaker, Why Don't You Sing? (1983). New York: Random House. ISBN 978-0-394-52144-2
- Poems (1986). New York: Random House. ISBN 978-0-553-25576-8
- Now Sheba Sings the Song (1987). New York: Plume Books. ISBN 978-0-452-27143-2
- I Shall Not Be Moved (1990). New York: Bantam Books. ISBN 978-0-553-35458-4
- On the Pulse of Morning (1993). New York: Random House. ISBN 978-0-679-74838-0
- The Complete Collected Poems of Maya Angelou (1994). New York: Random House. ISBN 978-0-679-42895-4
- Phenomenal Woman: Four Poems Celebrating Women (1995). New York: Random House. ISBN 978-0-679-43924-0
- A Brave and Startling Truth (1995). New York: Random House. ISBN 978-0-679-44904-1
- "From a Black Woman to a Black Man", 1995
- Amazing Peace (2005). New York: Random House. ISBN 978-1-4000-6558-5
- Mother: A Cradle to Hold Me (2006). New York: Random House. ISBN 978-1-4000-6601-8
- "Celebrations, Rituals of Peace and Prayer" (2006). New York: Random House. ISBN 978-0-307-77792-8
- Poetry for Young People (2007). Berkshire, U.K.: Sterling Books. ISBN 978-1-4027-2023-9
- "We Had Him", 2009
- "His Day is Done", 2013
- Maya Angelou: The Complete Poetry (2015). New York: Random House. ISBN 978-0-8129-9787-3
- "Woman Work"

=== Personal essays ===
- Wouldn't Take Nothing for My Journey Now (1993). New York: Random House. ISBN 978-0-553-56907-0
- Even the Stars Look Lonesome (1997). New York: Random House. ISBN 978-0-375-50031-2
- Letter to My Daughter (2008). New York: Random House. ISBN 978-1-4000-6612-4

=== Cookbooks ===
- Hallelujah! The Welcome Table: A Lifetime of Memories with Recipes (2004). New York: Random House. ISBN 978-1-4000-6289-8
- Great Food, All Day Long: Cook Splendidly, Eat Smart (2010). New York: Random House. ISBN 978-1-4000-6844-9≠←

=== Children's books ===
- Life Doesn't Frighten Me (1993). New York: Stewart, Tabori & Chang. ISBN 978-1-55670-288-4
- My Painted House, My Friendly Chicken and Me (1994). New York: Knopf Books. ISBN 978-0-517-59667-8. With photographs by Margaret Courtney-Clarke.
- Kofi and His Magic (1996). New York: Knopf Books. ISBN 978-0-517-59667-8. With photographs by Courtney-Clarke.
- Maya's World series (2004). New York: Random House:

- Izak of Lapland, ISBN 978-0-375-92833-8
- Angelina of Italy, ISBN 978-0-375-82832-4
- Renée Marie of France ISBN 978-0-375-82834-8
- Mikale of Hawaii ISBN 978-0-375-92835-2

=== Plays ===
- Cabaret for Freedom (musical revue), with Godfrey Cambridge, 1960
- The Least of These, 1966
- The Best of These (drama), 1966
- Gettin' up Stayed on My Mind, 1967
- Sophocles, Ajax (adaptation), 1974
- And Still I Rise (writer/director), 1976
- Moon on a Rainbow Shawl (director), 1978

=== Film and television ===
- Blacks, Blues, Black! (writer, producer and host – ten one-hour programs, National Education Television), 1968
- Georgia, Georgia (writer for script and musical score), Sweden, 1972
- All Day Long (writer/director), 1974
- PBS documentaries (1975):

- Who Cares About Kids & Kindred Spirits (KERA-TV, Dallas, Texas)
- Maya Angelou: Rainbow in the Clouds (WTVS-TV, Detroit, Michigan)
- To the Contrary (Maryland Public Television)
- Tapestry and Circles

- Assignment America (six one-half hour programs), 1975
- Part One: The Legacy; Part Two: The Inheritors (writer and host), 1976
- I Know Why the Caged Bird Sings (writer for script and musical score), 1979
- Sister, Sister (writer), 20th Century Fox Television, 1982
- Brewster Place (writer), ABC, 1990
- Down in the Delta (director), Miramax Films, 1998
- The Black Candle (poetry, narration), Starz, 2012

=== Plays and films acted in (partial list) ===
- Porgy and Bess, 1954–1955
- Calypso, 1957
- The Blacks, 1960
- Mother Courage, 1964
- Look Away, 1973
- Roots, ABC, 1977
- Runaway, Hallmark Hall of Fame Productions, 1993
- Poetic Justice, 1993
- Touched by an Angel ("Reunion"), CBS, 1995
- How to Make an American Quilt, Universal Pictures, 1995
- Madea's Family Reunion, Tyler Perry Studios, 2006

=== Recordings ===
- Miss Calypso, Scamp Records, 1957
- For the Love of Ivy, ABC Records, 1968
- "And So It Goes" (co-written with Roberta Flack for Flack's album Oasis), 1988
- Been Found (collaborated on 7 tracks with Ashford & Simpson), 1996
- "Music, Deep Rivers in My Soul" (with Wynton Marsalis), 2007

=== Spoken-word albums ===
- The Poetry of Maya Angelou, GWP Records, 1969
- Women in Business, 1981
- On the Pulse of Morning, Random House Audio, 1993
- A Song Flung Up to Heaven, Random House Audio, 2002

== Radio ==
- Talk show host, Oprah and Friends, XM Satellite Radio, launched 2006
