= Poetry of Maya Angelou =

Maya Angelou's poetic works

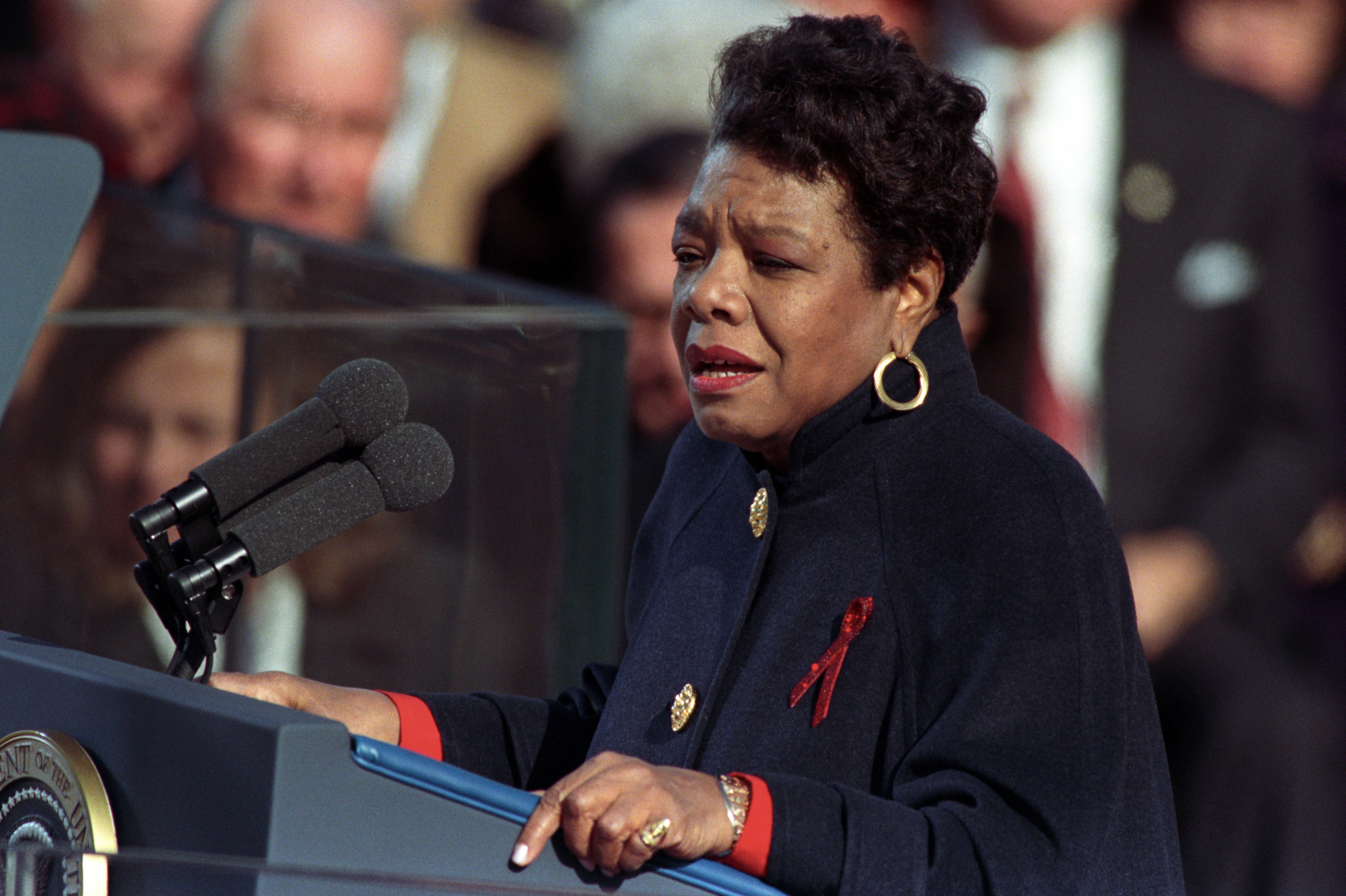
Maya Angelou, reciting her poem, "On the Pulse of Morning", at the 1993 inauguration of President Bill Clinton

Maya Angelou, an African-American writer who is best known for her seven autobiographies, was also a prolific and successful poet. She has been called "the black woman's poet laureate", and her poems have been called the anthems of African Americans. Angelou studied and began writing poetry at a young age, and used poetry and other great literature to cope with trauma, as she described in her first and most well-known autobiography, I Know Why the Caged Bird Sings. She became a poet after a series of occupations as a young adult, including as a cast member of a European tour of Porgy and Bess, and a performer of calypso music in nightclubs in the 1950s. Many of the songs she wrote during that period later found their way to her later poetry collections. She eventually gave up performing for a writing career.

Despite considering herself a poet and playwright, she wrote Caged Bird in 1969, which brought her international recognition and acclaim. Many of her readers consider her a poet first and an autobiographer second, but she is better known for her prose works. She has published several volumes of poetry, and has experienced similar success as a poet. Early in her writing career, she began alternating a volume of poetry with an autobiography. In 1993, she recited one of her best-known poems, "On the Pulse of Morning", at the inauguration of President Bill Clinton. Angelou explores many of the same themes throughout all her writings, in both her autobiographies and poetry. These themes include love, painful loss, music, discrimination and racism, and struggle. Her poetry cannot easily be placed in categories of themes or techniques. It has been compared with music and musical forms, especially the blues, and like the blues singer, Angelou uses laughter or ridicule instead of tears to cope with minor irritations, sadness, and great suffering. Many of her poems are about love, relationships, or overcoming hardships. The metaphors in her poetry serve as "coding", or litotes, for meanings understood by other Blacks, but her themes and topics apply universally to all races. Angelou uses everyday language, the Black vernacular, Black music and forms, and rhetorical techniques such as shocking language, the occasional use of profanity, and traditionally unacceptable subjects. As she does throughout her autobiographies, Angelou speaks not only for herself, but for her entire gender and race. Her poems continue the themes of mild protest and survival also found in her autobiographies, and inject hope through humor. Tied with Angelou's theme of racism is her treatment of the struggle and hardships experienced by her race.

Many critics consider Angelou's autobiographies more important than her poetry. Although her books have been best-sellers, her poetry has been studied less. Angelou's lack of critical acclaim has been attributed to her popular success and to critics' preferences for poetry as a written form rather than a spoken, performed one.

== Background ==
Maya Angelou studied and began writing poetry at a young age, having "fallen in love with poetry in Stamps, Arkansas", where she grew up and the setting of her first autobiography, I Know Why the Caged Bird Sings (1969). At the age of eight, she was raped, as recounted in Caged Bird. She dealt with her trauma by memorizing and reciting great works of literature, including poetry, which helped bring her out of her self-imposed muteness. According to scholar Yasmin Y. DeGout, literature also affects Angelou's sensibilities as the poet and writer she becomes, especially the "liberating discourse that would evolve in her own poetic canon".

As a young adult, Angelou, who preferred to be called Maya because her brother had called her that when she was a child, had a series of jobs and occupations, achieving modest success as a singer, dancer, and performer. She was a cast member of a European tour of Porgy and Bess in 1954 and 1955 and was a cabaret singer in nightclubs in the San Francisco and Los Angeles areas throughout the 1950s. While performing at the Purple Onion in San Francisco, due to the strong suggestion of her managers and supporters, she changed her name from Rita Johnson to Maya Angelou, a "distinctive name" that set her apart and captured the feel of her calypso dance performances. In 1957, Angelou recorded her first album, Miss Calypso, which captured her focus on calypso music, popular at the time, and her years as a nightclub performer. As she described in her fourth autobiography, The Heart of a Woman (1981), Angelou eventually gave up performing for a writing career, although music remained an important aspect of her poetry. In the late 1980s, she returned to music. In 1988, she co-wrote a song with Roberta Flack, "And So It Goes", which appeared on Flack's album Oasis. Angelou collaborated with R&B artists Ashford & Simpson on seven of the eleven tracks of their 1996 album Been Found. The album was responsible for three of Angelou's only Billboard chart appearances. In 2007, she and jazz musician Wynton Marsalis wrote "Music, Deep Rivers in My Soul", which traces the history of African-American music. Angelou was also a fan of country music, and had written several songs. (Note: "I Hope You Dance", Angelou's favorite song, was performed by country artist Lee Ann Womack at Angelou's 2014 memorial service. "Been Found", the title song from the Ashford & Simpson album, was also played at her memorial.)

Angelou recorded two albums of poetry and songs written during her time as a night club performer; the first in 1957 for Liberty Records and the second, "The Poetry of Maya Angelou", for GWP Records the year before the publication of Caged Bird. They were later incorporated into her volumes of poetry. Despite considering herself a playwright and poet when her editor Robert Loomis challenged her to write Caged Bird—which brought her international recognition and acclaim—she has been best known for her seven autobiographies. Through the writing of her autobiography, Angelou became one of the first African American women who was able to publicly discuss her personal life and was recognized and highly respected as a spokesperson for blacks and women. It made her "without a doubt, ... America's most visible black woman autobiographer", and "a major autobiographical voice of the time".

Beginning with Caged Bird, Angelou used the same "writing ritual" for many years. She woke early in the morning and checked into a hotel room, where the staff was instructed to remove any pictures from the walls. She wrote on legal pads while lying on the bed, with only a bottle of sherry, a deck of cards to play solitaire, Roget's Thesaurus, and the Bible, and left by the early afternoon. She averaged ten to twelve pages of written material a day, which she edited down to three or four pages in the evening. She composed all her works this way, both prose and poetry.

== Poetry ==
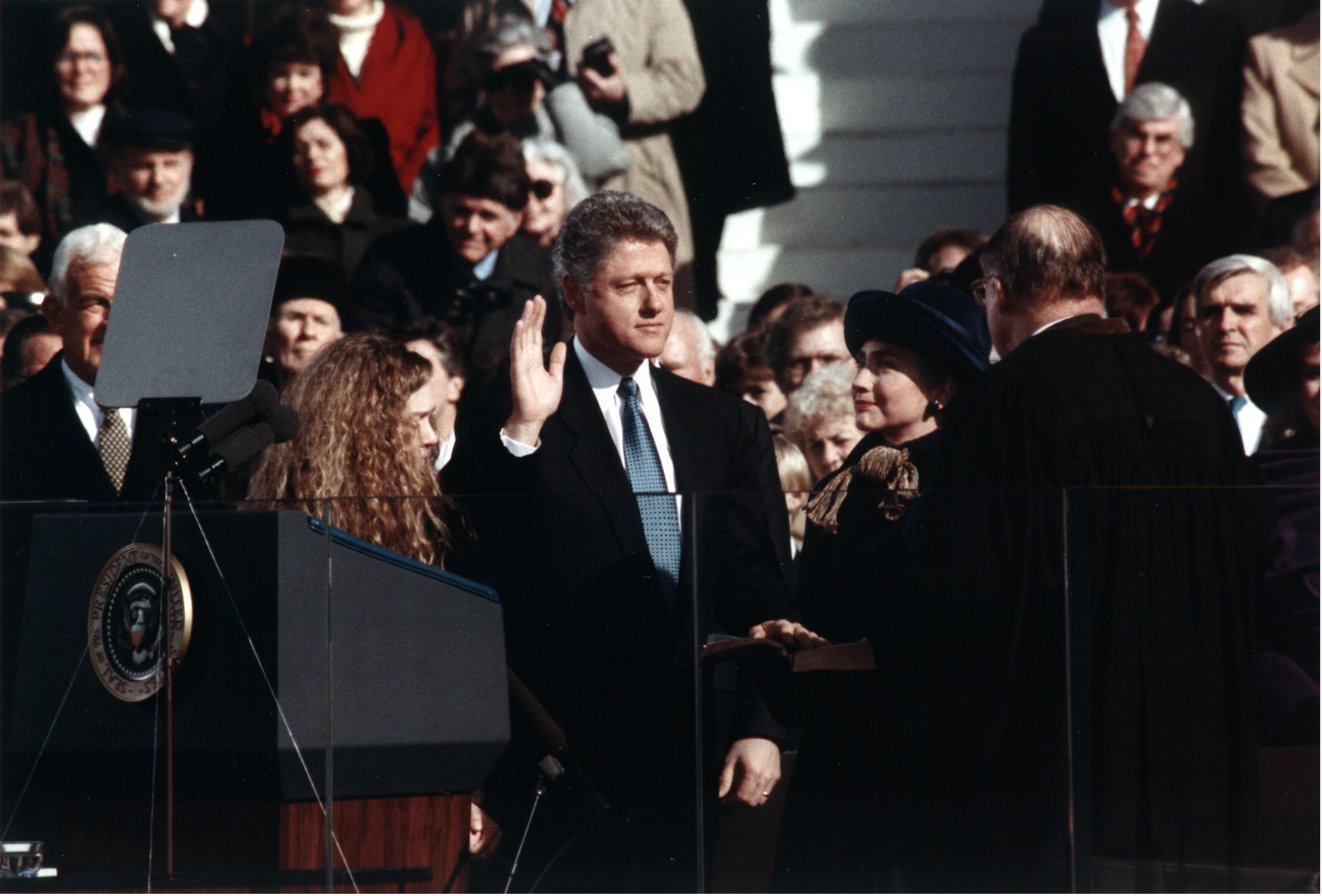
President Clinton taking the oath of office during his inauguration

Angelou has been a prolific poet, and has published several volumes of poetry, many of which have been best-sellers. She has experienced similar success as a poet as she did as an autobiographer. She began, early in her writing career, of alternating the publication of an autobiography and a volume of poetry. Her first volume of poetry, Just Give Me a Cool Drink of Water 'fore I Diiie, published in 1971 shortly after Caged Bird, became a best-seller and was nominated for a Pulitzer Prize. Many of the poems in Diiie were songs that Angelou had previously performed and recorded. In 1994, her publisher, Random House, placed this volume and her following four volumes of poetry in The Complete Collected Poems of Maya Angelou. Random House has also published several more volumes of Angelou's poetry, as well as stand-alone publications of single poems.

Angelou recited her most famous poem, "On the Pulse of Morning", at President Bill Clinton's inauguration in 1993. In 1995, she delivered what Richard Long called her "second 'public' poem", entitled "A Brave and Startling Truth", which commemorated the 50th anniversary of the United Nations. Also in 1995, she was chosen to recite one of her poems at the Million Man March. Angelou was the first African-American woman and living poet selected by Sterling Publishing, who placed 25 of her poems in a volume of their Poetry for Young People series in 2004. In 2009, Angelou wrote "We Had Him", a poem about Michael Jackson, which was read by Queen Latifah at his funeral. She wrote "His Day is Done", a poem honoring Nelson Mandela after his death in 2013. The poem was released in book form, along with a video of Angelou reciting it, by the U.S. State Department.

=== Collections ===
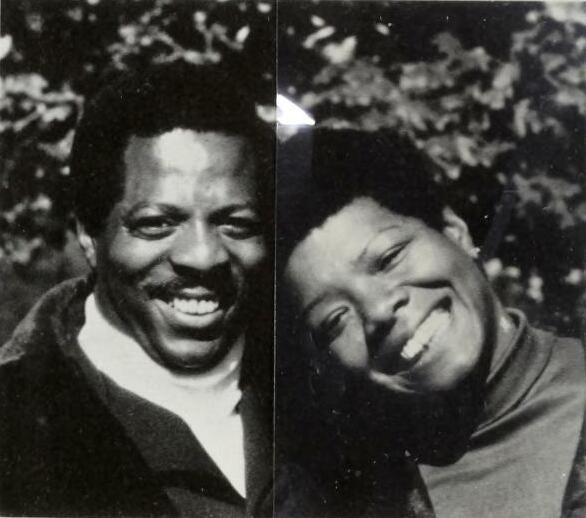
Angelou with Tom Feelings, who illustrated Now Sheba Sings the Song (1987).

- Just Give Me a Cool Drink of Water 'fore I Diiie (1971). New York: Random House. ISBN 978-0-394-47142-6
- Oh Pray My Wings Are Gonna Fit Me Well (1975). New York: Random House. ISBN 0-679-45707-0
- And Still I Rise (1978). New York: Random House. ISBN 978-0-394-50252-6
- Shaker, Why Don't You Sing? (1983). New York: Random House. ISBN 0-394-52144-7
- Poems (1986). New York: Random House. ISBN 0-553-25576-2
- Now Sheba Sings the Song (1987). New York: Plume Books. ISBN 0-452-27143-6
- I Shall Not Be Moved (1990). New York: Bantam Books. ISBN 0-553-35458-2
- The Complete Collected Poems of Maya Angelou (1994). New York: Random House. ISBN 0-679-42895-X
- Phenomenal Woman: Four Poems Celebrating Women (1995). New York: Random House. ISBN 0-679-43924-2
- Poetry for Young People (2007). Berkshire, U.K.: Sterling Books. ISBN 1-4027-2023-8
- Maya Angelou: The Complete Poetry (2015). New York: Random House. ISBN 978-0-8129-9787-3

=== Single publications ===
- "On the Pulse of Morning" (1993). New York: Random House. ISBN 0-679-74838-5
- "A Brave and Startling Truth" (1995). New York: Random House. ISBN 0-679-44904-3
- "From a Black Woman to a Black Man" (1995).
- "Amazing Peace" (2005). New York: Random House. ISBN 1-4000-6558-5
- "Mother: A Cradle to Hold Me" (2006). New York: Random House. ISBN 1-4000-6601-8
- "Celebrations, Rituals of Peace and Prayer" (2006). New York: Random House. ISBN 978-0-307-77792-8
- "We Had Him" (2009).
- "His Day is Done" (2013)

== Themes ==
=== General themes ===
Angelou explores many of the same themes throughout all her writings, in both her autobiographies and poetry. These themes include love, painful loss, music, discrimination and racism, and struggle. According to DeGout, Angelou's poetry cannot easily be placed in categories of themes or techniques.

Angelou sometimes pairs poems together in her collections to strengthen her themes, something she does, for example, throughout her second volume Oh Pray My Wings Are Gonna Fit Me Well (1975). Many of her poems, especially those in Oh Pray, contain universal identifications with ordinary objects. She uses familiar and feminine metaphors, many of the same themes also found in blues songs, and the dialect of African Americans to express universal themes applicable to all races. Angelou uses rhyme and repetition, which critic Lyman B. Hagen calls "rather ordinary and unimaginative" throughout all her works, both prose and poetry, yet rhyme is found in only seven of the thirty-eight poems in her first volume, Just Give Me a Cool Drink of Water 'fore I Diiie. Librarian John Alfred Avant states that many of Angelou's poems could be set to music like that of jazz singer and musician Nina Simone. For example, "They Went Home" in Diiie was originally written as song lyrics.

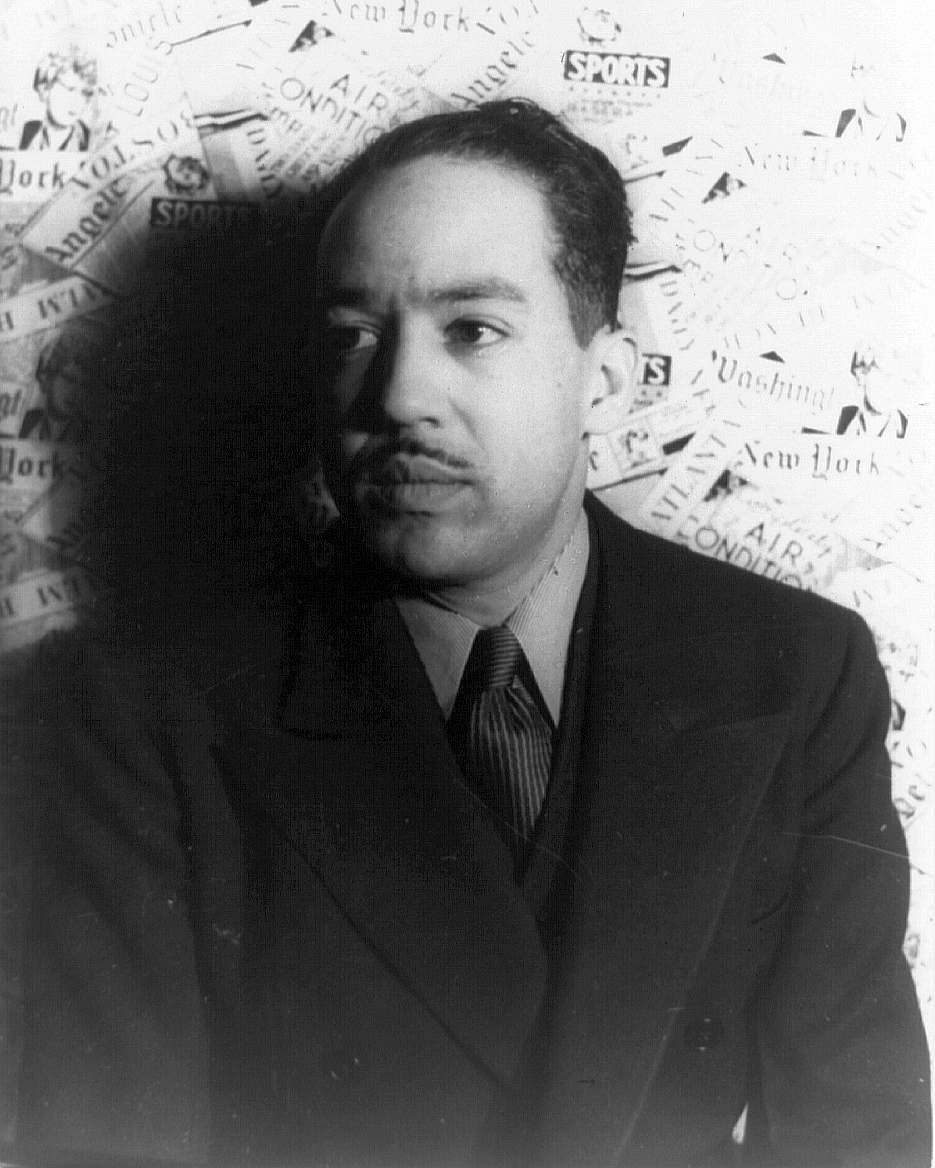
Angelou's poetry has been compared to the poetry of author Langston Hughes.

Angelou's poems have been compared to music and musical forms. The poems in her fourth volume, Shaker, Why Don't You Sing? (1983), have been compared to the music of French singer Édith Piaf. In her review of Shaker, Janet Blundell finds the best poems in the volume to be the ones that are structured like blues music. Critic Harold Bloom compares "Times-Square-Shoeshine-Composition" in Diiie to Langston Hughes' blues/protest poetry. He suggests that the best way to analyze the subjects, style, themes, and use of vernacular in this and most of Angelou's poems is to use "a blues-based model", since like the blues singer, Angelou uses laughter or ridicule instead of tears to cope with minor irritations, sadness, and great suffering. Blundell, in her review of Angelou's third volume And Still I Rise (1978) in Library Journal, finds Angelou's poems which mimic speech patterns and songs the most effective. However, she finds Angelou's other poems "mired in hackneyed metaphor and forced rhyme".

Many of Angelou's poems are about love and relationships. For example, all the poems in the first section of Diiie focus on love. In Southern Women Writers, Carol A. Neubauer states that they "describe the whole gamut of love, from the first moment of passionate discovery to the first suspicion of painful loss". Over half the poems in Shaker focus on love (specifically its inevitable loss) and doomed relationships.

Critic William Sylvester states that the metaphors in Angelou's poetry serve as "coding", or litotes, for meanings understood by other Blacks. In her poem "Sepia Fashion Show" in Diiie, for example, the last lines ("I'd remind them please, look at those knees / you got a Miss Ann's scrubbing") is a reference to slavery, when Black women had to show their knees to prove how hard they had cleaned. Sylvester states that Angelou uses this technique often in her poetry, and that it elicits a change in the reader's emotions; in this poem, from humor to anger. Sylvester says that Angelou uses the same technique in "Letter to an Aspiring Junkie", also in Diiie, in which the understatement contained in the repeated phrase "nothing happens" is a litotes for the prevalence of violence in society. Hagen calls Angelou's coding "signifying" and states, "A knowledge of black linguistic regionalisms and folklore enhances the appreciation of Angelou's poems". Hagen believes that despite the signifying that occurs in many of Angelou's poems, the themes and topics are universal enough that all readers would understand and appreciate them. DeGout states that Angelou conveys meaning through literary imagery, denser vocabulary, and poetic techniques such as catachresis, ambiguity, and anthropomorphism. Angelou's use of language frees her readers from their traditional perceptions and beliefs about human experience. She uses everyday language, the Black vernacular, Black music and forms, and rhetorical techniques such as shocking language, the occasional use of profanity, and traditionally unacceptable subjects. DeGout says that although this use of language is not the main technique she uses in her poetry, it appears in her more popular poems.

=== Racism/liberation ===
As she does throughout her autobiographies, Angelou speaks not only for herself, but for her entire gender and race. Her poems continue the themes of mild protest and survival also found in her autobiographies, and inject hope through humor. Many of Angelou's poems are personal in nature, especially those in Diiie and Oh Pray, but the theme of racism and connected to it, liberation, is present in her poems and autobiographies. According to DeGout, "a particular gift of the Angelou muse is the translation of personal experience into political discourse". Scholar Kathy M. Essick calls most of the poems in Diiie Angelou's "protest poems". The poems in the second section of Diiie, for example, are militant in tone; according to Hagen, the poems in this section have "more bite" than the ones in the first section and express the experience of being Black in a white-dominated world. DeGout states, however, that Angelou's poems have levels of meaning, and that poems in the volume's first section present the themes of racism, women's power, and liberation more subtly. DeGout views "A Zorro Man" as an example of Angelou's ability to translate her personal experience into political discourse and the textured liberation she places in all her poetry. Many of Angelou's poems, especially those in Diiie, focus on women's sexual and romantic experiences, but challenge the gender codes of poetry written in previous eras. She also challenges the male-centered and militaristic themes and messages found in the poetry of the Black Arts movement of the late 1960s and early 1970s, leading up to the publication of Diiie. DeGout cites "The Couple", which appears in Oh Pray, as another example of Angelou's strategy of combining liberation ideology and poetic techniques.

I note the obvious differences
between each sort and type,
but we are more alike, my friends,
than we are unalike

— Maya Angelou, "Human Family"

According to Bloom, the themes in Angelou's poetry are common in the lives of many American Blacks. Angelou's poems commend the survivors who have prevailed despite racism, difficulty, and challenges. Neubauer states that Angelou focuses on the lives of African Americans from the time of slavery to the 1960s, and that her themes "deal broadly with the painful anguish suffered by blacks forced into submission, with guilt over accepting too much, and with protest and basic survival".

Critic Robert B. Stepto states that the poem "One More Round", in And Still I Rise is heavily influenced by the work and protest songs of the past. The even-number stanzas in the eight-stanza poem create a refrain like those found in many work songs and are variations of many protest poems. Stepto is impressed with Angelou's creation of a new art form out of work and protest forms, but does not feel that she develops it enough. He places Angelou's work in the tradition of other Black poets, and compares the poems in And Still I Rise to the works of Langston Hughes, Gwendolyn Brooks, and Sterling Brown. Stepto also praises Angelou for borrowing "various folk rhythms and forms and thereby buttresses her poems by evoking aspects of a culture's written and unwritten heritage". Despite Angelou's strong criticism of racism, she also asserted in all her writings what Hagen calls a recurring theme, that "we are more alike than unalike".

=== Struggle ===
Out of the huts of history's shame
I rise
Up from a past that's rooted in pain
I rise
I'm a black ocean, leaping and wide
Welling and swelling I bear in the tide.
Leaving behind nights of terror and fear
I rise
Into a daybreak that's wondrously clear
I rise
Bringing the gifts that my ancestors gave,
I am the dream and the hope of the slave
I rise
I rise
I rise

— Maya Angelou, "Still I Rise"

All my work, my life, everything I do is about survival, not just bare, awful, plodding survival, but survival with grace and faith. While one may encounter many defeats, one must not be defeated".

— Maya Angelou

Tied with Angelou's theme of racism is her treatment of the struggle and hardships experienced by her race. Neubauer analyzes two poems in Diiie, "Times-Square-Shoeshine-Composition" and "Harlem Hopscotch", that support her assertion that for Angelou, "conditions must improve for the black race". Neubauer states, "Both [poems] ring with a lively, invincible beat that carries defeated figures into at least momentary triumph". In "Times-Squares", the narrator of the poem, a shoeshiner, takes on the role of the trickster, a common character in Black folklore. He retains his pride despite the humiliation he experiences in his occupation. "Harlem Hopscotch" celebrates survival and the strength, resilience, and energy necessary to accomplish it. Neubauer states, "These poems are the poet's own defense against the incredible odds in the game of life". According to DeGout, Angelou creates "a community of healing" for her readers, many of whom have experienced the same trauma and pain as the subjects of her poems. DeGout calls the technique "part of the blues mode in the Angelou canon", and considers Angelou's work as a precursor to the Black women writers of the 1970s, who used poetry to express liberation ideology and empowerment.

Neubauer asserts that the themes in the poems in And Still I Rise, as the title of the volume suggests, focus on a hopeful determination to rise above difficulty and discouragement. Neubauer states, "These poems are inspired and spoken by a confident voice of strength that recognizes its own power and will no longer be pushed into passivity". In Angelou's favorite poem, "Still I Rise", which has been compared with spirituals that express hope, she refers to the indomitable spirit of Black people. Despite adversity and racism, Angelou expresses her faith that one will overcome and triumph.

Like her previous poetry collections, Angelou's fourth volume, Shaker, Why Don't You Sing?, celebrates the ability to survive despite threatened freedom, lost love, and defeated dreams. Neubauer states that the poems in this volume are full of "the control and confidence that have become characteristic of Angelou's work in general". Their tone moves from themes of strength to humor and satire, and captures both the loneliness of lovers and the sacrifice that many slaves experienced without succumbing to defeat or despair. The poems in Shaker emphasize determination despite the "unabiding anguish over the oppression of the black race", and deal with the cruel treatment of slaves in the South.

== Critical reception and response ==
Many critics consider Angelou's autobiographies to be more important than her writings, including William Sylvester, who states that although Angelou's books have been best-sellers, her poetry has not been perceived as seriously as her prose. Despite her popular and critical acclaim garnered by her autobiographies, her poetry has been understudied, even after her recitation of "On the Pulse of Morning" in 1993. Like many reviewers of Angelou's poetry, Ellen Lippmann in her review of And Still I Rise in School Library Journal finds Angelou's prose stronger than her poetry, but found her strength more apparent in the poems in this volume than in Caged Bird. In his negative review of And Still I Rise, Stepto expresses disbelief that Angelou's poems would be produced by a major publishing house while poetry written by other lesser-known talents could not. He explains her popularity as a poet with her autobiographies, which he calls "marvelous" and the real reason for her success as a poet. He states that her poetry serves as explanatory texts for her prose works, which he calls "more adeptly rendered self-portraits".

Despite these reviews, many of Angelou's readers identify her as a poet first and an autobiographer second. Reviewer Elsie B. Washington has called her "the black woman's poet laureate", and has called Angelou's poetry the anthems of African Americans. African-American literature scholar Lynn Z. Bloom believes that Angelou's poetry is more interesting when she recites them. He considers her performances dynamic, and says that Angelou "moves exuberantly, vigorously to reinforce the rhythms of the lines, the tone of the words. Her singing and dancing and electrifying stage presence transcend the predictable words and phrases".

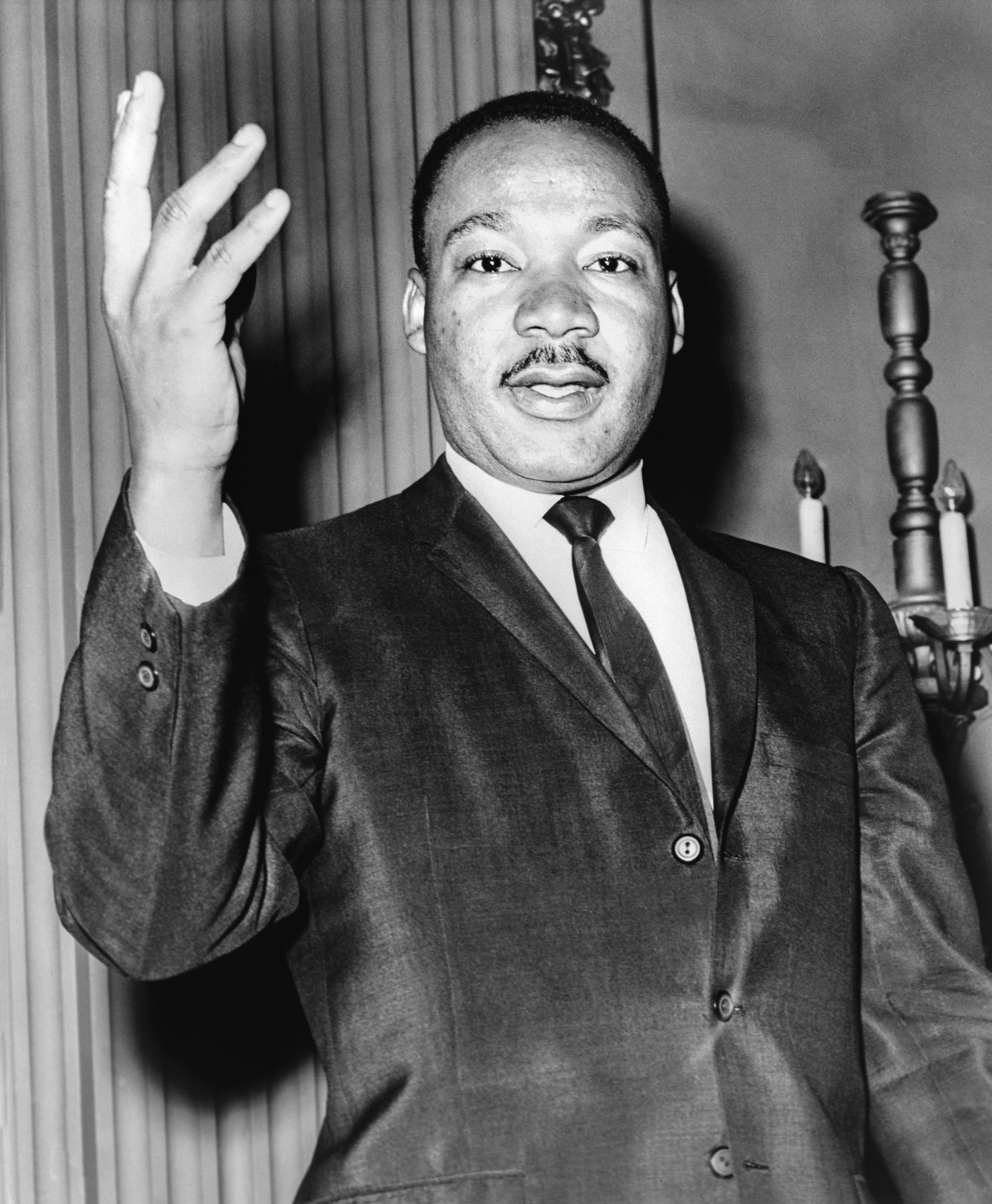
Martin Luther King Jr. Critics have stated that Angelou's poetry evokes the African-American oral tradition as exemplified by King.

Critic Mary Jane Lupton states that "Angelou's ultimate greatness will be attributed" to her most well-known poem, "On the Pulse of Morning", and that Angelou's "theatrical" performance of it, as seen when she recited it, at the 1993 inauguration of Bill Clinton, used skills she learned as an actor and speaker, marking a return to the African-American oral tradition of speakers such as Frederick Douglass, Martin Luther King Jr. and Malcolm X. Angelou was the first poet to read an inaugural poem since Robert Frost at the 1961 inauguration of John F. Kennedy, and the first Black and woman. Her recitation resulted in more fame and recognition for her previous works, and broadened her appeal "across racial, economic, and educational boundaries".

Gillespie states that Angelou's poems "reflect the richness and subtlety of Black speech and sensibilities" and were meant to be read aloud. Angelou has supported Gillespie, telling an interviewer in 1983 that she wrote poetry so that it would be read aloud. Critic Harold Bloom, although he calls Angelou's poetry "popular poetry" and states that it "makes no formal or cognitive demands upon the reader", compares her poems to musical forms such as country music and ballads. He characterizes her poems as having a social rather than aesthetic function, "particularly in an era totally dominated by visual media". Sylvester, who says that Angelou "has an uncanny ability to capture the sound of a voice on a page", places her poems, especially the ones in Diiie, in the "background of black rhythms". Chad Walsh, reviewing Diiie in Book World, calls Angelou's poems "a moving blend of lyricism and harsh social observation". Jessica Letkemann, writing for Billboard, traced the musical qualities of Angelou's poems to her experience as a singer and musician, and said that they were "full of rhythm, melody, cadence buoying her powerful words".

Scholar Zofia Burr, who calls Angelou's poetry "unabashedly public in its ambitions", connects Angelou's lack of critical acclaim to both the public nature of many of her poems and to Angelou's popular success, and to critics' preferences for poetry as a written form rather than a verbal, performed one. Bloom agrees, stating that Angelou's acclaim has been public rather than critical. Critic James Finn Cotter, in his review of Oh Pray, calls it an "unfortunate example of the dangers of success" and states that Angelou's fame has "muted the private and personal quality that it takes to be essential to poetry". Critic John Alfred Avant, despite the fact that the volume was nominated for a Pulitzer Prize, states that Diiie "isn't accomplished, not by any means". Even critics who value poetry as an oral tradition devalue Angelou's poetry; critic Bryan D. Bourn, who praises her for using African oral tradition, states that she "slips into banality when she abandons" them and criticizes her for not catering to poetry critics. Scholar Joanne Braxton asserts that "Angelou's audience, composed largely of women and blacks, isn't really affected by what white and/or male critics of the dominant literary tradition have to say about her work. This audience does not read literary critics; it does read Maya Angelou". Burr condemns Angelou's critics for their narrow view of poetry, which has resulted in their negative reviews of her poetry, and for not taking into account Angelou's larger purposes in her writing: "to be representative rather than individual, authoritative rather than confessional".

Angelou was an inspiration to the modern hip-hop community. Artists such as Danny Brown, Lupe Fiasco, Jean Grae, and The Roots mention her in their songs. Tupac Shakur, who appeared in the film Poetic Justice, which featured Angelou's poetry, named his album Still I Rise, released in 1999 after his death, for Angelou's poem. Nicki Minaj wrote a song also called "Still I Rise", for her 2009 mixtape Beam Me Up Scotty. Although Minaj's song does not mention Angelou explicitly, its themes of overcoming hardship echo the themes in Angelou's poem. Angelou inspired the work of Kanye West, who has referenced Angelou throughout his career, including in a remix of Talib Kweli's "Get By", which West produced in 2002, and in his own song, "Hey Mama" from the album Late Registration, produced in 2005. Common collaborated with Angelou in 2011 in his song, "The Dreamer", which featured her reciting a poem at the end of the song. Angelou admitted later that his use of profanity in the song "surprised and disappointed" her. According to Time, Angelou believed that rap music was an avenue for young people to discover poetry, and that she was optimistic about the future of poetry, telling one of its reporters, "“All I have to do is listen to hip-hop or some of the rappers".
