= Loomis (surname) =

Origin
- Origin: Anglo-Saxon
- Meaning: derived from Lomax (Lumhalghs), near Bury, Greater Manchester, meaning "pool nook/recess"
- Region of origin: England, Ireland and Scotland

Other names
- Variant forms: Lomax, Lomaz, Lumox, Lummus, Lummis and Lomis

Loomis is an English language surname. Notable people and characters with the name include:

== People ==
- Alfred Loomis (disambiguation), several people
- Andrew Loomis (1892–1959), illustrator
- Arphaxed Loomis (1798–1885), American politician
- Benjamin Franklin Loomis, (1857–1935), American photographer
- Bernard Loomis (1923–2006), American toy inventor/marketer
- Charles Battell Loomis (1861–1911), American author
- Chauncey Loomis (ca. 1783–1817), New York politician
- Chester Loomis (1789–1873), New York politician
- Clinton "Fear" Loomis (born 1988), professional Dota gamer
- David B. Loomis (1817–1897), American politician
- Dwight Loomis (1821–1903), American politician
- Eben Jenks Loomis (1828–1912), American astronomer
- Edward Eugene Loomis (1864–1937), president of the Lehigh Valley Railroad
- Elias Loomis (1811–1889), American mathematician
- Elisha Scott Loomis (1852–1940), American teacher, mathematician, genealogist, writer and engineer
- Evarts G. Loomis (1910–2003), American physician
- Francis Loomis (disambiguation), several people
- Frank Loomis (1896–1971), American athlete
- Frederic Brewster Loomis, American paleontologist
- Frederick Oscar Warren Loomis (1870–1937), Canadian major-general
- George B. Loomis (1833–1887), American music teacher
- Gustavus Loomis (1789–1872), American soldier
- Hamilton Loomis (born 1975), American blues guitarist, singer, songwriter, and record producer
- Harold F. Loomis (1896–1972), American botanist and millipede taxonomist
- Harvey Worthington Loomis (1865–1930), American composer
- Henry Loomis (1919–2008), American businessman
- James H. Loomis (1823–1914), New York politician
- Jeff Loomis (born 1971), guitarist
- John Mason Loomis (1825–1900), American businessman
- John Q. Loomis (c. 1824–1869), Confederate Army officer
- Jon Loomis (born 1959), American writer
- Laura Hibbard Loomis (1883–1960), American literary scholar
- Louise Ropes Loomis (1874–1958), American historian
- Lynn Harold Loomis (1915–1994), American mathematician
- Mabel Loomis Todd (1856–1932), born Mabel Loomis, American writer
- Mahlon Loomis (1826–1886), American inventor, pioneer of radio telegraphy, said to have invented the wireless radio
- Mickey Loomis, General Manager of the New Orleans Saints football franchise
- Nancy Loomis, stage name of American actress Nancy Kyes (born 1949)
- Noel Loomis (1905–1969), American writer of fiction and history
- Orland Steen Loomis (1893–1942), Governor-elect of Wisconsin
- Rick Loomis, American game designer
- Rick Loomis (photojournalist) (born 1969), American photojournalist
- Robbie Loomis (born 1964), American NASCAR crew chief
- Robert Loomis (1926–2020), American editor
- Roger Sherman Loomis (1887–1966), American scholar of medieval and Arthurian literature
- Roland Loomis (1930–2018), father of the modern primitive movement
- Samuel Loomis (disambiguation), several people
- Silas Laurence Loomis (1822–1896), American scientist and educator
- Stanley Loomis, American writer of French history

== Fictional characters ==
- Sam Loomis, a character in the Psycho franchise
- Colonel Ezra Pound Loomis, a character from Gears of War: Judgement
- Peggy Loomis, a character in the film The Town That Dreaded Sundown
- Dr. Samuel Loomis, a character in the Halloween film series
- Willie Loomis, a character in the Dark Shadows television series
- Billy Loomis, a character in the first Scream movie
- Mrs Loomis, the mother of Billy Loomis, a character in Scream 2
- Oswald Loomis, Superman villain the Prankster

== See also ==
- Loomis (disambiguation) for other meanings
