= The Complete Collected Poems of Maya Angelou =

Book by Maya Angelou

- Author: Maya Angelou
- Language: English
- Genre: Poetry
- Publisher: Random House
- Publication date: 1994
- Publication place: United States
- Media type: Print (hardback & paperback)
- ISBN: 067942895X

The Complete Collected Poems of Maya Angelou is author and poet Maya Angelou's collection of poetry, published by Random House in 1994. It is the first collection of her poetry published after she read her poem "On the Pulse of Morning" at President Bill Clinton's inauguration in 1993. It contains her previous five books of poetry, published between 1971 and 1990. Angelou's prose works have been more successful than her poetry, which has received little serious attention by critics.

== History ==
The Complete Collected Poems of Maya Angelou is Angelou's first collection of poetry. By the time of its publication in 1994, she had published five autobiographies, eventually going on to publish seven, and five books of poetry. She began, early in her writing career, alternating the publication of an autobiography and a volume of poetry.

Her publisher, Random House, placed the poems of her previous volumes in this collection, perhaps to capitalize on her popularity following her reading of her poem "On the Pulse of Morning" at President Bill Clinton's inauguration in 1993. The volumes included in the collection are Just Give Me a Cool Drink of Water 'fore I Diiie (1971), Oh Pray My Wings Are Gonna Fit Me Well (1975), And Still I Rise (1978), Shaker, Why Don't You Sing? (1983), and I Shall Not Be Moved (1990). Also included was "On the Pulse of Morning". Angelou's publisher placed four previously published poems in a smaller volume, entitled Phenomenal Woman, in 1995.

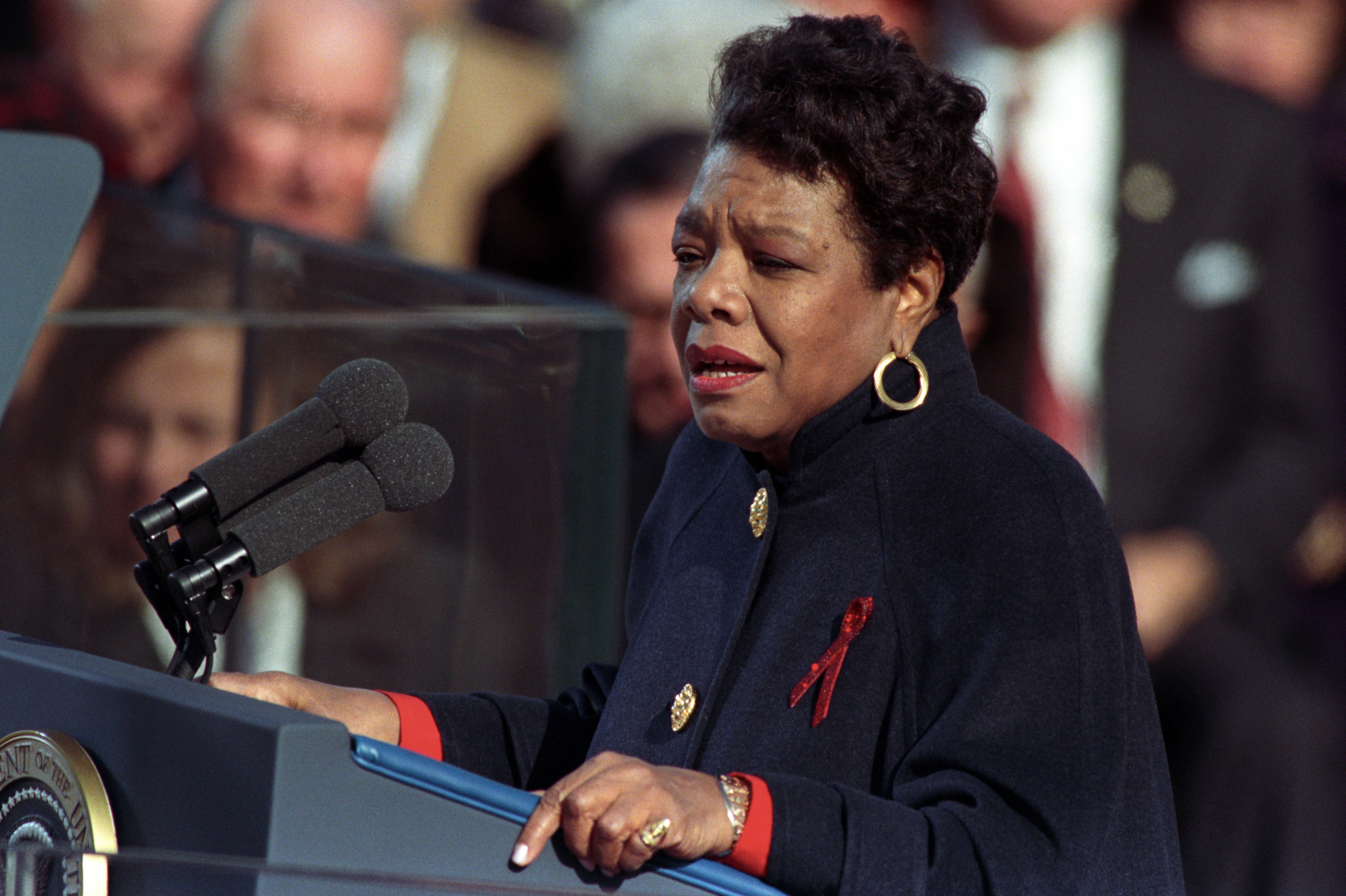
Angelou reciting her poem "On the Pulse of Morning" at President Bill Clinton's inauguration in 1993

Angelou studied and began writing poetry at a young age. After her rape at the age of eight, as recounted in her first autobiography I Know Why the Caged Bird Sings (1969), she dealt with her trauma by memorizing and reciting great works of literature, including poetry, which helped bring her out of her self-imposed muteness. She considered herself a playwright and poet when her editor Robert Loomis challenged her to write Caged Bird, but she is best known for her autobiographies. Many of her readers identify her as a poet first and an autobiographer second, but, like Lynn Z. Bloom, many critics consider her autobiographies more important than her poetry.

Critic William Sylvester has stated that although Angelou's books have been best-sellers, her poetry has "received little serious critical attention". Bloom also believes that her poetry is more interesting when she recites them. Bloom calls her performances "characteristically dynamic", and says that Angelou "moves exuberantly, vigorously to reinforce the rhythms of the lines, the tone of the words. Her singing and dancing and electrifying stage presence transcend the predictable words and phrases".

== Maya Angelou: The Complete Poetry ==
In 2015, a year after Angelou's death, Random House published an expanded collection entitled Maya Angelou: The Complete Poetry. In addition to all of the poems in this collection, it adds a dozen of her poems published after "On the Pulse of Morning", specifically those in Celebrations, Rituals of Peace and Prayer (including "A Brave and Startling Truth" and Mother: A Cradle to Hold Me) that were not in the original collection, plus "His Day Is Done", published after the death of Nelson Mandela in 2013, and the previously unpublished "Amazement Awaits", which had been commissioned for the 2008 Summer Olympics.
