= Phenomenal Woman: Four Poems Celebrating Women =

Book by Maya Angelou

- Author: Maya Angelou
- Language: English
- Published: 1995

Phenomenal Woman: Four Poems Celebrating Women is a book of poems by Maya Angelou, published in 1995.

The poems in this short volume were published in Angelou's previous volumes of poetry. "Phenomenal Woman," "Still I Rise," and "Our Grandmothers" appeared in And Still I Rise (1978) and "Weekend Glory" appeared in Shaker, Why Don't You Sing? (1983). The volume was published a year after Random House published The Complete Collected Poems of Maya Angelou, Angelou's first collection of poetry, and two years after she read her poem "On the Pulse of Morning" at President Bill Clinton's inauguration in 1993.
