= I Shall Not Be Moved (poetry collection) =

Book by Maya Angelou

- Author: Maya Angelou
- Language: English
- Genre: Poetry
- Publisher: Random House
- Publication date: 1990
- Publication place: United States
- Media type: Print (hardback & paperback)
- ISBN: 0553354582
- Preceded by: Shaker, Why Don't You Sing?

I Shall Not Be Moved is author and poet Maya Angelou's fifth collection of poetry, published by Random House in 1990. She had written four autobiographies and published four other volumes of poetry up to that point. She considered herself a poet and a playwright and her poetry has also been successful, but she is best known for her seven autobiographies, especially her first, I Know Why the Caged Bird Sings. She began, early in her writing career, alternating the publication of an autobiography and a volume of poetry. Most critics agree that Angelou's poems are more interesting when she recites them.

The poems in I Shall Not Be Moved focus on themes of hard work, universal experiences of humans, the struggle of African Americans, and love and relationships. Like most of her poetry, the collection has received little serious critical attention, although most reviews have been positive.

== Background ==
I Shall Not Be Moved is Maya Angelou's fifth volume of poetry. She studied and began writing poetry at a young age. After her rape at the age of seven, as recounted in her first autobiography I Know Why the Caged Bird Sings (1969), she dealt with her trauma by memorizing and reciting great works of literature, including poetry, which helped bring her out of her self-imposed muteness.

Although Angelou considered herself a playwright and poet when her editor Robert Loomis challenged her to write Caged Bird, she has been best known for her autobiographies, and many critics consider her autobiographies more important than her poetry. Critic William Sylvester agrees, and states that although her books have been best-sellers, her poetry has "received little serious critical attention". Lynn Z. Bloom believes that Angelou's poems are more interesting when she recites them. Bloom calls her performances "characteristically dynamic", and says that Angelou "moves exuberantly, vigorously to reinforce the rhythms of the lines, the tone of the words. Her singing and dancing and electrifying stage presence transcend the predictable words and phrases".

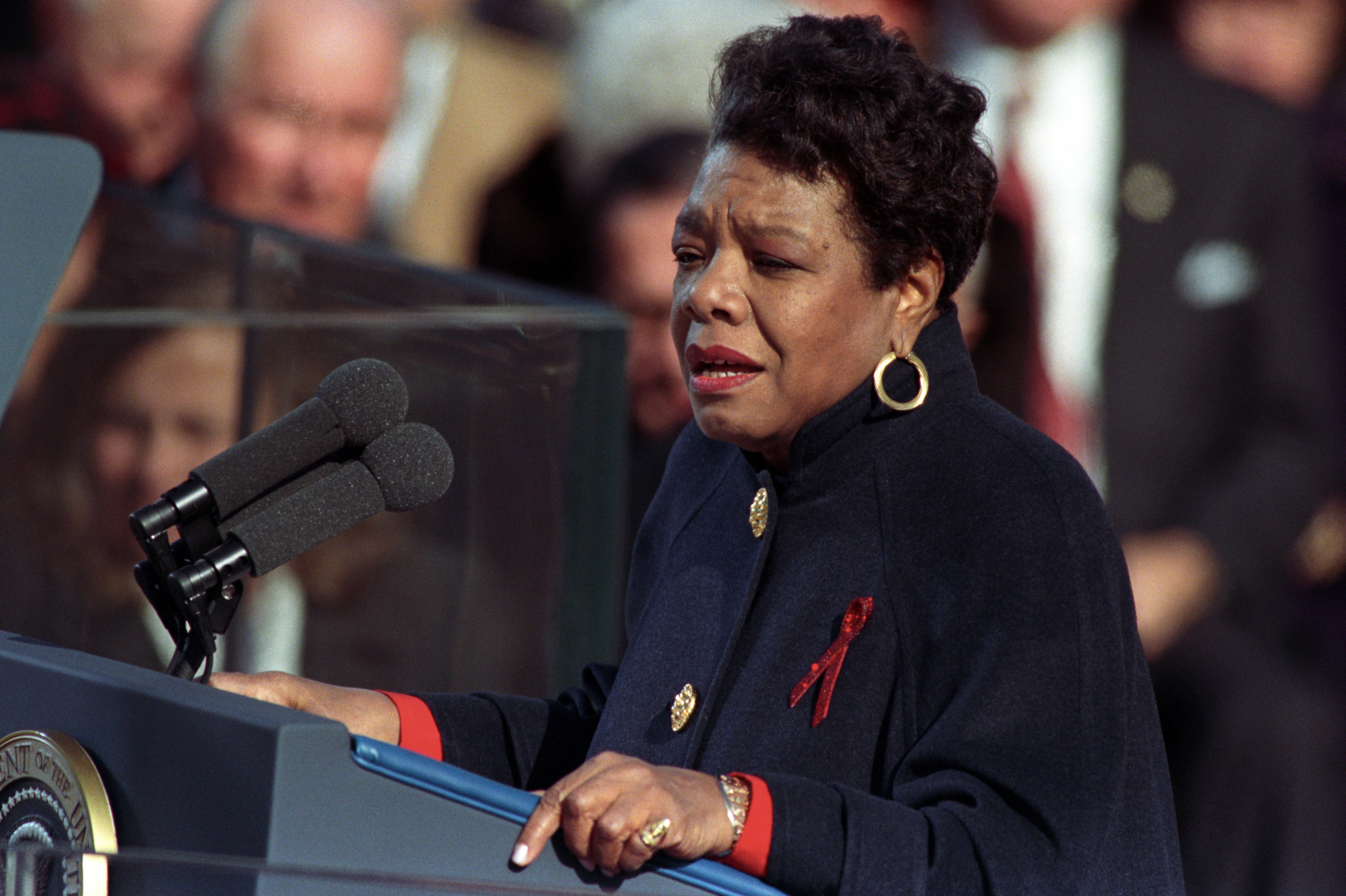
Angelou reciting her poem "On the Pulse of Morning" at President Bill Clinton's inauguration in 1993

Early in her writing career, Angelou began alternating the publication of an autobiography and a volume of poetry. By the time I Shall Not Be Moved was published in 1990, she had published five autobiographies, eventually going on to publish seven. Her publisher, Random House, placed the poems in I Shall Not Be Moved in her first collection of poetry, The Complete Collected Poems of Maya Angelou (1994), perhaps to capitalize on her popularity following her reading of her poem "On the Pulse of Morning" at President Bill Clinton's inauguration in 1993. Also in the 1994 collection were her four previous collections, Just Give Me a Cool Drink of Water 'fore I Diiie (1971), Oh Pray My Wings Are Gonna Fit Me Well (1975), And Still I Rise (1978), and Shaker, Why Don't You Sing? (1983). Angelou's publisher placed four poems in a smaller volume entitled Phenomenal Woman in 1995.

== Themes ==
Critic Lyman B. Hagen states that much of Angelou's poetry and most of her writings, especially "Worker's Song", the first poem in I Shall Not Be Moved, praises the laborer. He says, "In Angelou's writings, rarely is there anyone who does not work. Everyone of her characters—singers, dancers, railway workers, etc.—works hard". Critic Hazel Rochman, who calls the poem an "exquisitely simple worksong", states that Angelou connects physical action with wit and longing. She compares it to the performances of singer Paul Robeson and to Langston Hughes' poem "Florida Road Workers". Michele Howe calls I Shall Not Be Moved "a collection that testifies to the undaunted spirit of oppressed people everywhere", and states that it "relates a history of hard work, pain, joy, and the affection and heartbreak often associated with love". She also mentions "Worker's Song" in her article in the New Jersey newspaper The Star-Ledger, stating that it describes the struggles of the workers that "keep the whole world running".

Howe says that although Angelou writes about the Black experience, she draws from the experiences of all ethnic backgrounds. Howe considers the poem "Our Grandmothers", which relates the struggle of a woman attempting to overcome her enslavement and oppression, one of the most poignant poems in the volume and its focal point. The poem uses the title phrase; according to Howe, Angelou's use of the personal pronoun signifies the universal experience of mothers and grandmothers and their struggles to overcome obstacles. Howe also discusses the poem "Coleridge Jackson", which she considers another significant poem in I Shall Not Be Moved. The poem describes a man who "wouldn't take tea for the fever"—someone incapable of creatively dealing with his suffering at the hands of his employer. Angelou informed Howe that she believed that "Coleridge Jackson" was one of the most powerful poems she had ever recited in public.

In the poem "Love Letter", Angelou describes the power of love to empower people to be themselves in their relationships, and to be equal with their partners. "Human Family" focuses on the similarities of all people, especially the line "We are more alike, my friends, than we are unalike". According to Howe, this line sums the themes found throughout the volume. (Note: Angelou uses this line again in her 1993 book of essays Wouldn't Take Nothing for My Journey Now, and in Letter to My Daughter (2008). Lupton calls it Angelou's most famous statement.)

== Reviews ==
Rochman, when she compares "Worker's Song" to Hughes' "Florida Road Workers", states that like Hughes, Angelou's poem combines rhythm and sense. She considers the poem the best in the volume, calling many of the other poems in I Shall Not Be Moved "too polemical". Rochman says that the sensuous details in Angelou's best poems enlivens her abstractions, and finds no false sentiments in them. She also states, "The dying fall of many lines combined with the strong beat reinforces the feeling of struggle and uncertainty".

== Poems ==
The volume's title, according to Angelou, comes from her desire to encourage young people to "have a moral stance" and never give up, despite the tendency for people in power to ignore, deny, or neglect their duty to use their positions and abilities to change the world. It is dedicated to her mother Vivian Baxter and Mildred Garris Tuttle.

- "Worker's Song"
- "Human Family"
- "Man Bigot"
- "Old Folks Laugh"
- "Is Love"
- "Forgive"
- "Insignificant"
- "Love Letter"
- "Equality"
- "Coleridge Jackson"
- "Why Are They Happy People"
- "Son to Mother"
- "Known to Eve and Me"
- "These Yet to Be United States"
- "Me and My Work"
- "Changing"
- "Born That Way"
- "Televised"
- "Nothing Much"
- "Glory Falls"
- "London"
- "Savior"
- "Many and More"
- "The New House"
- "Our Grandmothers"
- "Preacher, Don't Send Me"
- "Fightin' Was Natural"
- "Loss of Love"
- "Seven Women's Blessed Assurance"
- "In My Missouri"
- "They Ask Why"
- "When Great Trees Fall"

== Works cited ==
- Bloom, Harold. (2001). Maya Angelou. Broomall, Pennsylvania: Chelsea House Publishers. ISBN 0-7910-5937-5
- Bloom, Lynn Z. (1985). "Maya Angelou". In Davis, Thadious M.; Harris, Thadius (eds.). Afro-American Writers after 1955. Vol. 38. Detroit, Michigan: Gale Research Company. pp. 3–11. ISBN 0-8103-1716-8.
- Hagen, Lyman B. (1997). Heart of a Woman, Mind of a Writer, and Soul of a Poet: A Critical Analysis of the Writings of Maya Angelou. Lanham, Maryland: University Press. ISBN 978-0-7618-0621-9.
- Lupton, Mary Jane (1998). Maya Angelou: A Critical Companion. Greenwood Press. ISBN 978-0-313-30325-8.
