= Celebrations, Rituals of Peace and Prayer =

Book by Maya Angelou

- Author: Maya Angelou
- Language: English
- Published: 2006

Celebrations, Rituals of Peace and Prayer is a collection of poetry by African American writer and poet Maya Angelou, published by Random House in 2006. The volume contains 12 poems, five of which were previously published.

Critic Richard Long called two of the previously published poems, "On the Pulse of Morning" and "A Brave and Startling Truth", Angelou's "public" poems. She read "On the Pulse of Morning", her most famous poem, at the inauguration of President Bill Clinton in 1993. In 1995, she recited "A Brave and Startling Truth" during the 50th anniversary commemoration of the United Nations. "Amazing Peace" was read during the annual National Christmas Tree lighting in 2005, and "Mother" was written for Mother's Day in 2006.
