= Loomis =

Loomis may refer to:

== Places ==
=== Canada ===
- Loomis, Saskatchewan

=== United States ===
- Loomis, California
- Loomis, Michigan
- Loomis, Nebraska
- Loomis, New York, a hamlet in Liberty, New York
- Loomis, South Dakota
- Loomis, Washington
- Loomis, Wisconsin
- Loomis Chaffee, a school in Windsor, Connecticut, originally known as The Loomis Institute
- Loomis Museum, an historical homestead museum in California
- Loomis station, a former train station and mansion in Washington
- Loomis station (CTA Englewood branch), a former Chicago 'L' train station

== Structures ==
- Loomis Homestead, Windsor, Connecticut
- Capt. James Loomis House, Windsor, Connecticut
- Loomis-Parry Residence, Augusta, Kansas
- Fowler-Loomis House, Oswego County, New York
- Robert and Mabel Loomis House, Hood River, Oregon

== People ==
- See Loomis (surname)

== Television and film ==
The surname Loomis is common in horror and science fiction films, with characters in the Psycho, Halloween, Scream, Jurassic Park and Dark Shadows films or franchises carrying the name. Dr Samuel Loomis in Halloween was directly named after the character in Psycho.

- Billy Loomis, a character in the first installment of Scream
- Lila Loomis (née Crane), a character in Psycho and Psycho II
- Sam Loomis, a character in Psycho
- Loomis (TV pilot), failed 2000s TV pilot starring Cheri Oteri
- Oswald Loomis, Superman villain the Prankster
- Dr. Samuel Loomis, a character in the Halloween film series
- "Deanie" Loomis, protagonist of Splendor in the Grass
- Willie Loomis, a character in the TV series and movies Dark Shadows
- Rose Loomis and George Loomis, the femme fatale and her husband in Niagara
- "The Loomis Case," a historical spree-killing in a hotel referred to in the episode "Terminus" in series 8 of Endeavour
- Dr Henry Loomis, Jurassic World Rebirth

== Business ==
- Loomis Express, a Canadian courier service subsidiary of TFI International
- Loomis (company), a cash handling company, formerly a subsidiary of Securitas AB
- Loomis, Sayles & Company, an American investment management firm

== See also ==
- Loomis Gang, a family of outlaws in New York during the 19th century
- Samuel Loomis (disambiguation)
- Lummis
