= Dolores White =

American composer and educator (1932–2023)

Dolores R. White
- Born: June 17, 1932; Chicago, Illinois
- Died: March 24, 2023 (aged 90); Cleveland, Ohio
- Occupations: Composer; Educator
- Spouse: Donald White (cellist)

Dolores Rae Miller White (June 17, 1932 – March 24, 2023) was an American composer and music educator.

== Biography ==
=== Early life and education ===
Dolores White was born in Chicago, Illinois to Lillian and Ray Miller in 1932. She began studying piano as a child, and dreamed of becoming a professional concert pianist.

She attended Howard University for two years before transferring to the Oberlin College Conservatory of Music. After earning her Bachelor's degree in piano performance from Oberlin, she then attended the Cleveland Institute of Music and received a Master of Music in both composition and piano performance. White also did post-graduate work at Ohio State University, studying with Thomas Wells, and at Kent State University with James Waters. She, at one point, engaged in further studies at the Juilliard School of Music.

=== Career ===
Throughout her long career, White held faculty positions at many different colleges, including the Hartt School of Music, Cuyahoga Community College, the College of Wooster, as well as arts organizations like Karamu House in Cleveland. She also taught piano at The Music Settlement in Cleveland. Her music was commissioned and performed by organizations like the Cleveland Composers Guild, Robert Page Singers, the Society of Composers Festival, and the Masterworks Chorale of Toledo, among others.

White was an active member of many musical organizations, including the International Alliance for Women in Music, ASCAP, and the American Music Center.

Her works were performed by orchestras like the Dallas Symphony in 2001, and the Detroit Symphony, where she was selected as a finalist in the Detroit Symphony Composers Competition in 1994.

=== Personal life ===
Dolores married cellist Donald White shortly before he became the first African American member of the Cleveland Orchestra in 1957. Together, they had two children, Darrow White, a violinist and elementary music educator, and Diana White-Gould, a professional pianist and director of the Dike School of the Arts keyboard choir programs.

=== Legacy ===
Several of White's compositions are displayed at Rhode Island College's Adams Library as part of an exhibit about African American women composers, alongside others such as Margaret Bonds, Undine Smith Moore, Valerie Capers, Julia Perry, and Dorothy Rudd Moore.

In their remembrance of her life, the Cleveland Institute of Music (CIM) described White, saying,

White was both a CIM alumna and a Cleveland legend. She pushed past racial and gender boundaries and wrote music esteemed and regularly performed by artists and ensembles all over the country. She also was a beloved teacher at The Music Settlement and a longtime assistant professor at Cuyahoga Community College. Her death is a significant loss to the Cleveland cultural community and to the musical world in general.

Much of her music was published (or republished) in 2025 and 2026 by the American Composers Alliance.

== Compositional style ==
When asked about her work, White stated, "“I’ve always thought the average person needs to know about different cultures. It’s important to have exposure to different music, different genres, and different histories...I take risks, I dream big, and I use humor in my works in different ways which helps to keep my optimistic views."

Keith Fitch, head of composition at CIM, described her music as "always sincere, expressive, and skillfully made, drawing on a mix of international, American, and ethnic elements, often with a dash of humor thrown into the mix."

== Selected works ==
=== Orchestral ===
- Celebration: Salute to the Arts (1994)
- Crystal Gazing (1994)
- Shades of Color for solo violin and string orchestra (2018)
- Give Birth to the Dream for narrator, soprano voice, and orchestra (1998), on a text by Maya Angelou, excerpts from On the Pulse of Morning (performed and recorded by the Lexington Philharmonic in 2024)

=== Choral ===
- A Choral Triptych for SATB chorus (1987)
- The City for vocal ensemble with soprano soloist (1991)
- The Snow Storm for SATB chorus and trumpet (2004)
- Three Madrigrals on texts by John Donne and John Dowland for SATB chorus (2006)

=== Vocal ===
- Three Art Songs for Baritone Voice and Piano (1980)
- On a Fly Drinking from His Cup for baritone voice and piano (1990)
- Song Cycle for Soprano and B-flat Clarinet (1998)
- "Four Glimpses of the Night" for soprano and tenor voice (1998)
- "To a Dead Friend" for soprano and tenor voice (2000)
- "That Black Reef" for voice and piano (2003)

=== Chamber music ===
- Three Pictures for trombone and piano (1992)
- Duet for Two Guitars (1993)
- Three Pieces for Flute and Piano (1997)
- Ritmo do Claves for two pianos (2000)
- Sprials for percussion and horn (2001)
- Episodes for string trio (2001)
- Conditional Convergence for string trio (2001)
- Bouncy for violin and piano (2011)
- Flirting for violin and piano (2011)
- Three Short Pictures for violin and piano (2011)
- Undercurrents for violin and piano (2011)
- Dream for clarinet and piano (2012)
- Summer Trio for clarinet, violin, and cello (2013)
- Caprice for cello and piano (2014)
- On Edge for cello and piano (2014)
- The Emerald Trio for marimba, oboe, and bassoon (2015)
- Intermezzo, Allegro, and Rondino for oboe and piano (2018)
- We Wear the Mask for voice, piano, and percussion (2018)
- Sparkle for flute and triangle (2020)
- String Quartet (1998)
- Earth Dances 1, 2, 3 for percussion ensemble (1998)

=== Solo instrumental ===
- Theme and Variations for Piano (1983)
- Blues Dialogues for violin (1988)
- Five Pieces for B-flat Clarinet (1990)
- Toccata for Solo Piano (1999)
- Fugue Odyssey for marimba (2015)
- Evening Mist for horn (2011)
- Sequence for Violoncello (2012)
- Hot Spices for piano (2013)
- Poem for piano (2014)
- Statements for cello (2015)
- Brief Linear Tributes (2013)

== Discography ==
- Crystal Gazing, on The New American Scene II: 5 Distinguished African American Composers (1998), recorded by the Cleveland Chamber Symphony for Albany Records
- Blues Dialogues For Solo Violin, on Blues Dialogues: Music by Black Composers (2018), recorded by Rachel Barton Pine and Matthew Hagle for Cedille Records
