= Francis Loomis =

Francis Loomis may refer to:

- Francis Loomis (Connecticut politician) (1812–1892), 58th Lieutenant Governor of Connecticut
- Francis Butler Loomis (1861–1948), 25th United States Assistant Secretary of State
- Francis Wheeler Loomis (1889–1976), American scientist
- Francis B. Loomis Jr. (1903–1989), United States Marine Corps general

== See also ==
- Frank Loomis (1896–1971), American athlete
- Loomis (surname)
