= Lummis =

Lummis is a surname. Notable people with the surname include:

- Ben Lummis (born 1978), New Zealand pop and R&B singer
- Charles Fletcher Lummis (1859–1928), American journalist, historian, and poet
- Cynthia Lummis (born 1954), American politician, U.S. Senator (State of Wyoming); state treasurer 1999–2007
- Dayton Lummis (1903-1988), American actor
- Shandré Lummis (born 1998), South African Visual artist and Scholar
- Suzanne Lummis (born 1951), American poet; granddaughter of Charles Fletcher Lummis
- Trevor Lummis (1930–2013), English writer and historian
- William Lummis (1886–1985), British Anglican Church clergyman and historian

== See also ==
- Loomis (disambiguation)
