= Shaker, Why Don't You Sing? =

Book by Maya Angelou

Shaker, Why Don't You Sing
- Author: Maya Angelou
- Language: English
- Genre: Poetry
- Publisher: Random House
- Publication date: 1983
- Publication place: United States
- Media type: Print (hardback & paperback)
- ISBN: 978-0394521442
- Preceded by: And Still I Rise
- Followed by: I Shall Not Be Moved

Shaker, Why Don't You Sing? is author and poet Maya Angelou's fourth volume of poetry, published by Random House in 1983. It was published during one of the most productive periods in Angelou's career; she had written four autobiographies and published three other volumes of poetry up to that point. She considered herself a poet and a playwright, but was best known for her seven autobiographies, especially her first, I Know Why the Caged Bird Sings, although her poetry has also been successful. She began, early in her writing career, alternating the publication of an autobiography and a volume of poetry. Many of the poems in Shaker focus on survival despite threatened freedom, lost love, and defeated dreams. Over half of them are love poems, and emphasize the inevitable loss of love. "Caged Bird", which refers to Angelou's first autobiography, is contained in this volume.

== Background ==
Shaker, Why Don't You Sing is Maya Angelou's fourth volume of poetry. She studied and began writing poetry at a young age. After her rape at the age of eight, as recounted in her first autobiography, I Know Why the Caged Bird Sings (1969), she dealt with her trauma by memorizing and reciting great works of literature, including poetry, which helped bring her out of her self-imposed muteness.

The publication of Shaker, Why Don't You Sing occurred during one of the most productive periods of Angelou's career. She had written songs for Roberta Flack and had composed movie scores. She had written articles, short stories, TV scripts and documentaries, autobiographies, and poetry, she produced plays, and was named a visiting professor of several colleges and universities. Angelou was given a multitude of awards during this period, including over 30 honorary degrees from colleges and universities from all over the world. In 1981, after ten years of marriage, Angelou and her husband, Paul du Feu, divorced. Angelou returned to the southern United States, where she accepted the lifetime Reynolds Professorship of American Studies at Wake Forest University in Winston-Salem, North Carolina, and taught a variety of subjects that reflected her interests, including philosophy, ethics, theology, science, theater, and writing.

Although Angelou considered herself a playwright and poet when her editor, Robert Loomis, challenged her to write Caged Bird, she has been best known for her autobiographies. Many of Angelou's readers identify her as a poet first and an autobiographer second, but like Lynn Z. Bloom, many critics consider her autobiographies more important than her poetry. Critic William Sylvester agrees, and states that although Angelou's books have been best-sellers, her poetry has "received little serious critical attention". Bloom also believes that Angelou's poetry is more interesting when she recites them. Bloom calls her performances "characteristically dynamic", and says that Angelou "moves exuberantly, vigorously to reinforce the rhythms of the lines, the tone of the words. Her singing and dancing and electrifying stage presence transcend the predictable words and phrases".

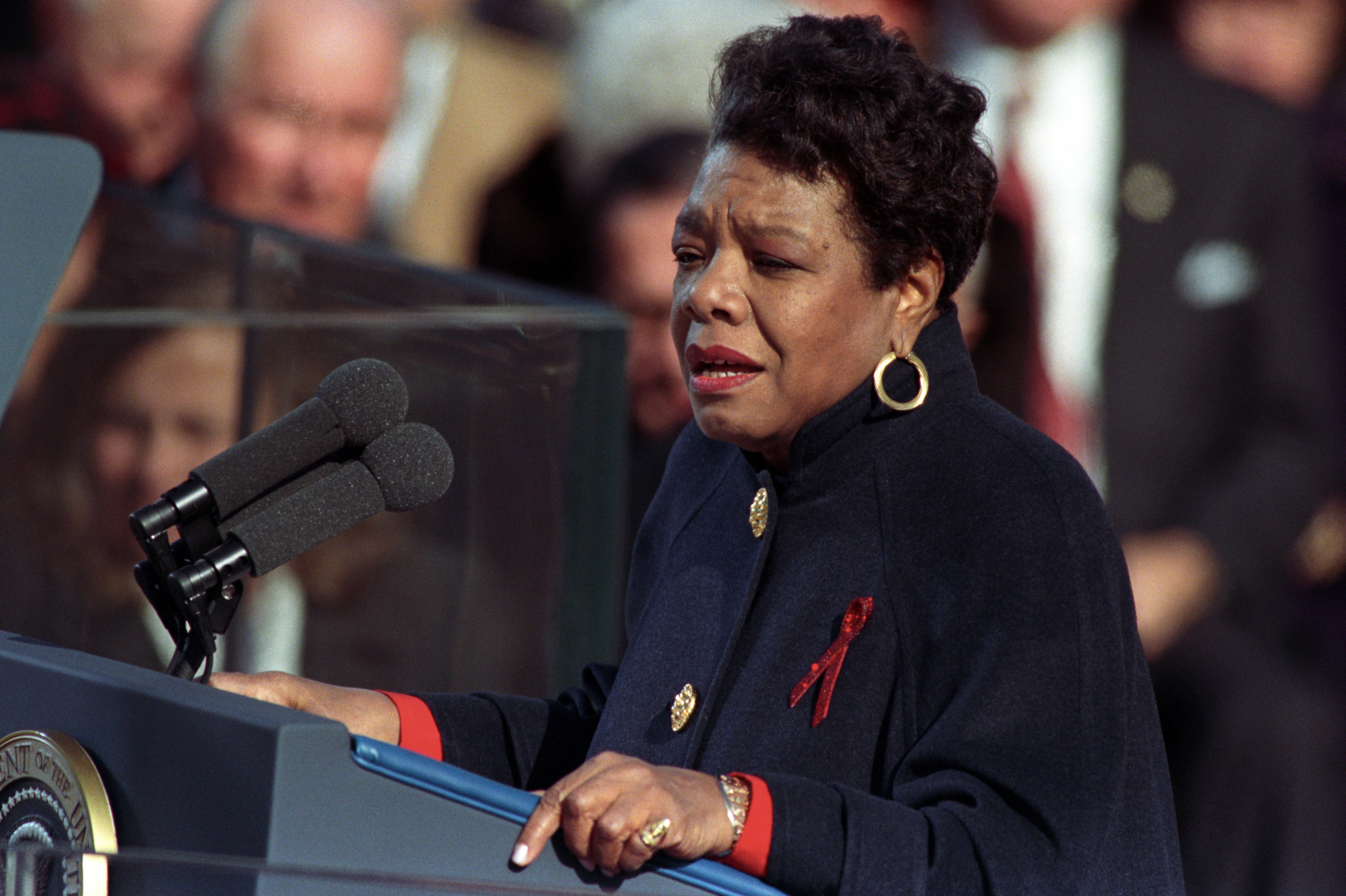
Angelou reciting her poem "On the Pulse of Morning" at President Bill Clinton's inauguration in 1993

Angelou began, early in her writing career, to alternate the publication of an autobiography and a volume of poetry. By the time Shaker was published in 1983, she had published four autobiographies, eventually going on to publish seven. Her publisher, Random House, placed the poems in Shaker in her first collection of poetry, The Complete Collected Poems of Maya Angelou (1994), perhaps to capitalize on her popularity following her reading of her poem, "On the Pulse of Morning", at President Bill Clinton's inauguration in 1993. Also in the 1994 collection were her three previous collections, Just Give Me a Cool Drink of Water 'fore I Diiie (1971), Oh Pray My Wings Are Gonna Fit Me Well, and And Still I Rise (1978), along with I Shall Not Be Moved, published in 1990. Angelou's publisher placed four poems in a smaller volume, entitled Phenomenal Woman, in 1995.

== Themes ==
According to critic Carol E. Neubauer, like Angelou's previous poetry collections, "Shaker celebrates the ability to survive despite threatened freedom, lost love, and defeated dreams". Neubauer also states that the poems in this volume are full of "the control and confidence that have become characteristic of Angelou's work in general". Their tone moves from themes of strength to humor and satire, and captures, more than her previous poetry, the loneliness of lovers and the sacrifice that many slaves experienced without succumbing to defeat or despair.

Over half the poems in Shaker focus on love and doomed relationships. In "The Lie", for example, the speaker feels compelled to use deception to protect herself from her lover's abandonment. In the brief poem "Prelude to a Parting", the speaker instinctively senses the inevitable and implicit end of her relationship, especially when her lover draws away from her touch. Not all the love poems in the volume focus on dishonesty or deception, but most, such as the title poem "Shaker, Why Don't You Sing?", describe the inevitable loss of love.

The rest of the poems in Shaker emphasize determination despite the "unabiding anguish over the oppression of the black race", and deal with the cruel treatment of slaves in the South. In the poem "Family Affairs", Angelou uses the German fairy tale "Rapunzel" as a framework to summarize her painful origins of slavery and to compare Black/white tensions. Critic J. T. Keefe calls it "a wise and deeply felt poem". Neubauer considers Angelou's poem "Caged Bird", which she says "inevitably brings Angelou's audience full circle" with her first autobiography, as the most powerful poem in the volume. Keefe agrees, and calls it Angelou's "central motif" and a "rhythmical and hypnotic chant that cries out to be sung". Neubauer states, "Her poems in Shaker, Why Don't You Sing imply that as long as such melodies are sung and heard, hope and strength will overcome defeated dreams". Scholar Yasmin Y. DeGout agrees, and cites "A Plagued Journey" as an example of Angelou's themes of liberation found in all her poetry. In the poem, Angelou calls for a reconsideration of the beliefs that limit human beings, and insists that "hope allows action and forces engagement with the world".

== Reviews ==
Janet B. Blundell, in Library Journal, finds Angelou's poetry lacking in comparison to her prose, and states, "The reader is jarred by stilted, 'poetic' language and stilted, sing-song, school-girlish rhyme". She finds the best poems in Shaker are the ones that are structured like blues music. Mary S. Cosgrove, in Horn Book Magazine, calls the poems in Shaker "a lyrical outpouring of seasoned feelings from the heart and mind", and calls Angelou "musical, rhythmical, and enchanting". J.T. Keefe, in World Literature Today, says about Shaker": "Deceptively light and graceful, Maya Angelou's poems are lyrical, emotional, melancholy". Keefe compares Angelou's poems to music, especially the music of French singer Édith Piaf, and also states, "These poems are full of shining hurt as, like curving scimitars, they skillfully pierce the hearts of their readers".

== Poems ==
The caged bird sings
with a fearful trill
of things unknown
but longed for still
and his tune is heard
on the distant hill
for the caged bird
sings of freedom.
--"Caged Bird", Maya Angelou

Shaker, Why Don't You Sing?, which contains 28 poems, is dedicated to Angelou's son, Guy Johnson, and to her grandson, Colin Ashanti Murphy Johnson.

- "Awakening in New York"
- "A Good Woman Feeling Bad"
- "The Health-Food Diner"
- "A Georgia Song"
- Unmeasured Tempo"
- "Amoebaean for Daddy"
- "Recovery"
- "Impeccable Conception"
- "Caged Bird"
- "Avec Merci, Mother"
- "Arrival"
- "A Plagued Journey"
- "Starvation"
- "Contemporary Announcement"
- "Prelude to a Parting"
- "Martial Choreography"
- "To a Suitor"
- "Insomniac"
- "Weekend Glory"
- "The Lie"
- "Prescience"
- "Family Affairs"
- "Changes"
- "Brief Innocence"
- "The Last Decision"
- "Slave Coffle"
- "Shaker, Why Don't You Sing?"
- "My Life Has Turned to Blue"
