= Alfred Loomis =

Alfred Loomis may refer to:

- Alfred Lee Loomis (1887–1975), American physicist and philanthropist
- Alfred Lebbeus Loomis (1831–1895), American physician
- Alfred Loomis (sailor) (1913–1994), American investment banker and Olympic sailor
