= George B. Loomis =

George B. Loomis (10 May 1833 – 27 November 1887) was an American music teacher who began teaching in Indianapolis, Indiana in 1866. He was recommended for the position by Lowell Mason, a prestigious American music educator, and worked for several years without instructional materials. In response to this void, he created Loomis' Progressive Music Lessons, a series of texts widely used in Indiana and surrounding states during the late 19th century. He later became the first superintendent of music in the Indianapolis system.

Loomis was also one of the charter members of the Indiana Music Teachers Association, founded in 1877, one of the first such organizations in the country.

George B. Loomis Elementary School in Indianapolis is named after him.
