= Samuel Loomis (disambiguation) =

Samuel Loomis (aka Dr. Sam Loomis) is a fictional character in the Halloween film series.

Samuel Loomis may also refer to:

- Samuel Loomis (businessman) (1748–1814), American furniture maker
- Samuel Lane Loomis (1856–1938), American minister and author
- Sam Loomis, a fictional character in the 1959 novel Psycho, the 1960 film Psycho and the television series Bates Motel

== See also ==
- Samantha Carpenter, aka Sam Loomis, daughter of Billy Loomis, a fictional character from the 2022 film Scream
