= Oh Pray My Wings Are Gonna Fit Me Well =

Book by Maya Angelou

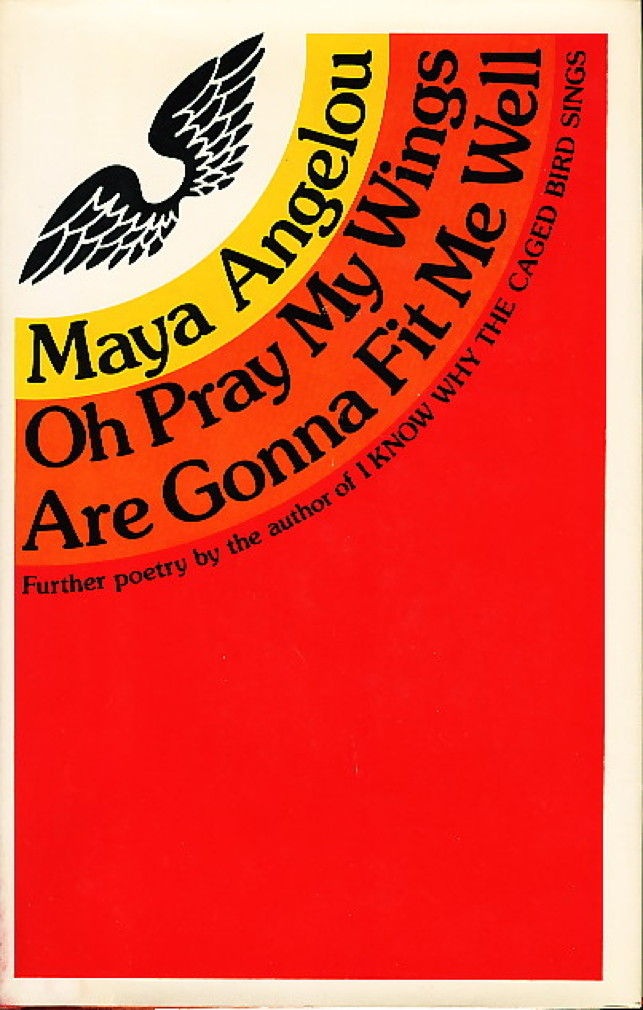
- The cover of Oh Pray My Wings Are Gonna Fit Me Well
- Author: Maya Angelou
- Language: English
- Genre: Poetry
- Publisher: Random House, Inc.
- Publication date: 1975 (1st edition)
- Publication place: United States
- Media type: Print (hardcover & paperback)
- Pages: 66 pp (hardcover 1st edition)
- ISBN: 978-0679457077 (hardcover 1st edition)
- Preceded by: Just Give Me a Cool Drink of Water 'fore I Diiie
- Followed by: And Still I Rise

Oh Pray My Wings Are Gonna Fit Me Well is a book of poems by American author Maya Angelou, published by Random House in 1975. It is Angelou's second volume of poetry, written after her first two autobiographies and first volume of poetry were published. Angelou considered herself a poet and a playwright, but was best known for her seven autobiographies, especially her first, I Know Why the Caged Bird Sings, although her poetry has also been successful. She began, early in her writing career, alternating the publication of an autobiography and a volume of poetry. Although her poetry collections have been best-sellers, they have not received serious critical attention.

Oh Pray is divided into five parts and consists of 36 poems. The volume is dedicated to "Paul". Like many of Angelou's poems, the poetry in the volume has been characterized as light verse. They contain identifications with ordinary objects and universal identifications. Oh Pray has received mixed reviews from critics. The poems in Oh Pray focus on themes of love, insight, and tension, and on overcoming difficulties. Angelou writes about ordinary objects and experiences about a variety of racial themes and concerns.

== Background ==
Oh Pray My Wings are Gonna Fit Me Well is Maya Angelou's second volume of poetry. She studied and began writing poetry at a young age. After her rape at the age of eight, as recounted in her first autobiography I Know Why the Caged Bird Sings (1969), she dealt with her trauma by memorizing and reciting great works of literature, including poetry, which helped bring her out of her self-imposed muteness. Angelou's film Georgia, Georgia, produced by a Swedish film company and filmed in Sweden, was the first screenplay written by a Black woman, and was released in 1972. Angelou married Welsh carpenter and ex-husband of Germaine Greer, Paul du Feu, in San Francisco in 1973.

Although Angelou considered herself a playwright and poet when her editor Robert Loomis challenged her to write Caged Bird, she has been best known for her autobiographies. Many of Angelou's readers identify her as a poet first and an autobiographer second, but many critics like Lynn Z. Bloom consider her autobiographies more important than her poetry. Critic William Sylvester agrees, and states that although her books have been best-sellers, her poetry has "received little serious critical attention". Bloom believes that Angelou's poetry is more interesting when she recites it. Bloom calls Angelou's performances "characteristically dynamic", and says that she "moves exuberantly, vigorously to reinforce the rhythms of the lines, the tone of the words. Her singing and dancing and electrifying stage presence transcend the predictable words and phrases".

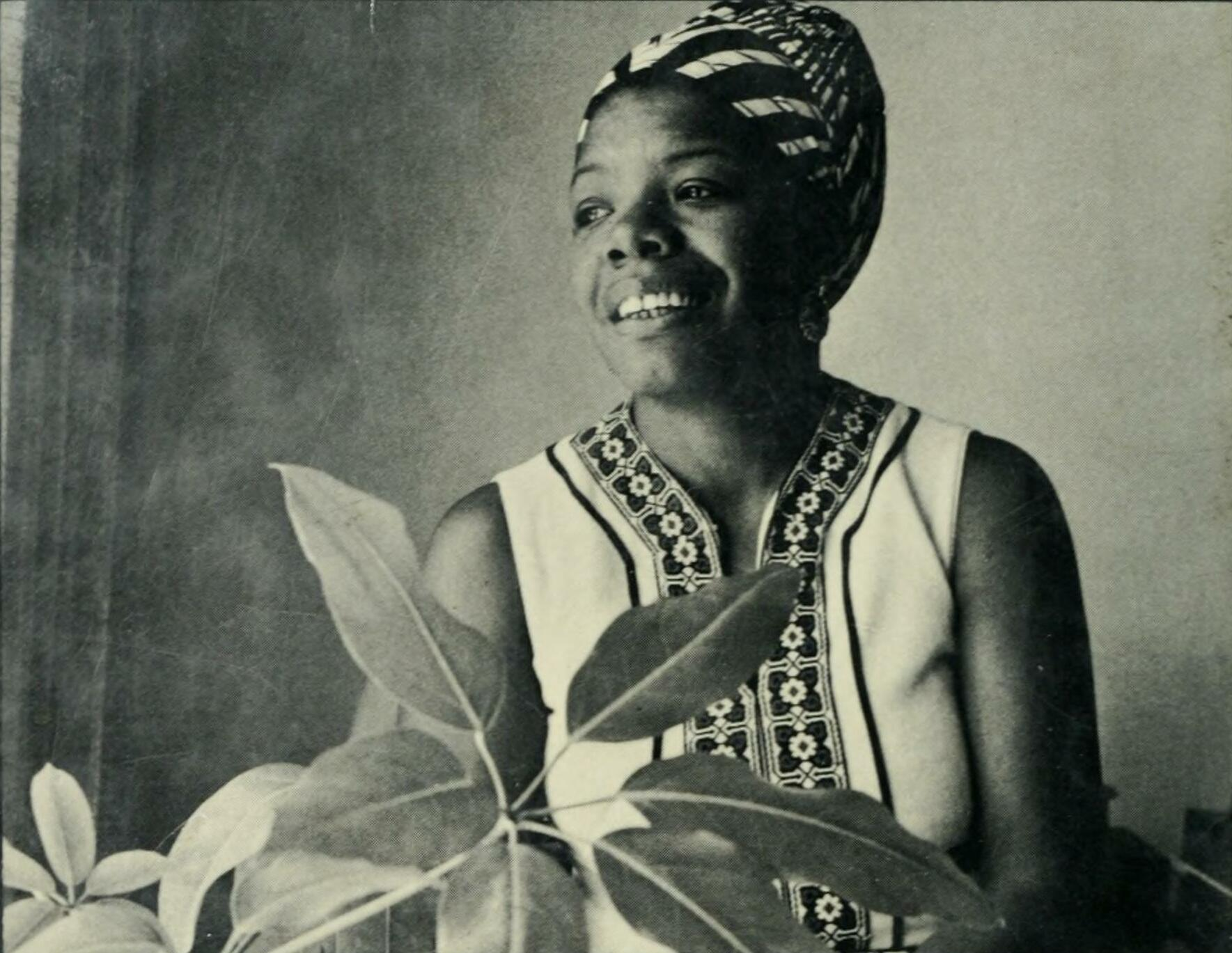
Portrait of Angelou from the first edition of Oh Pray

Angelou began, early in her writing career, alternating the publication of an autobiography and a volume of poetry. Her first volume of poetry, Just Give Me a Cool Drink of Water 'fore I Diiie (1971), which was nominated for a Pulitzer Prize, followed her first autobiography, and Oh Pray followed the publication of her second autobiography, Gather Together in My Name (1974). Her publisher, Random House, placed the poems in Oh Pray in her first collection of poetry, The Complete Collected Poems of Maya Angelou (1994), perhaps to capitalize on her popularity following her reading of her poem "On the Pulse of Morning" at President Bill Clinton's inauguration in 1993. Also in the 1994 collection was Just Give Me a Cool Drink of Water 'fore I Diiie and two more published after Oh Pray, And Still I Rise (1978) and Shaker, Why Don't You Sing? (1983). Angelou's publisher placed four more poems in a smaller volume, entitled Phenomenal Woman, in 1995.

== Themes ==
Many of Angelou's poems can be characterized as light verse. For example, Hagen characterizes "On Reaching Forty" as a light rumination about growing older. Angelou expresses sadness about having already reaching milestones in her youth, and ends the poem unexpectedly by humorously and ironically expressing admiration for those who die early. In this volume and in others, Angelou pairs poems together ("America" and "Africa"; "Communication I" and Communication II") to strengthen her themes.

The poems in this volume, like her poems in other volumes and contexts, contain universal identifications with ordinary objects. For example, "The Telephone" describes her relationship with an object, and how it has intruded upon the silence and solitude of her life. In this poem, which is three structured stanzas long, Angelou demands that the telephone ring, despite her resentment of its intrusion and her dependency upon it. She uses familiar and feminine metaphors, and themes also found in blues songs, such as the colors black and blue and weekend loneliness. In the poem "Poor Girl", Angelou uses the vernacular to express universal themes, in the voice of a teenage girl who has lost her boyfriend.

Scholar Yasmin Y. DeGout cites "The Couple" as an example of Angelou's practice of subtly including more than one level of meaning in her poems, of her ability to translate her personal experience into political discourse, and her placement of themes of racism and liberation. Angelou combines liberation ideology and poetic technique to challenge society's concepts of gender identity, especially in how it affects women. She varies the length of the poem's lines, beginning in the first stanza and continuing throughout the poem, to convey ambiguity and doubt, and to demand that the reader question their perceptions of gender and power. "The Couple", starting in its second stanza, attacks class-based ideals of masculinity in society. The poem ends by demanding that the social constructs surrounding gender and class end, and insists that human survival depends upon recognizing shared emotions and experience, regardless of one's gender or position in society.

== Poems ==
Oh Pray My Wings are Gonna Fit Me Well is divided into five parts, and consists of 36 poems. The volume is dedicated to "Paul".

Part One

- "Pickin Em Up and Laying Em Down"
- "Here's to Adhering"
- "On Reaching Forty"
- "The Telephone"

Part Two

- "Passing Time"
- "Now Long Ago"
- "Greyday"
- "Poor Girl"
- "Come, And Be My Baby"
- "Senses of Insecurity"
- "Alone"
- "Communication I"
- "Communication II"
- "Wonder"
- "A Conceit"

Part Three

- "Request"
- "Africa"
- "America"
- "For Us, Who Dare Not Dare"
- "Lord, in My Heart"
- "Artful Pose"

Part Four

- "The Couple"
- "The Pusher"
- "Chicken-Licken"

Part Five

- "I Almost Remember"
- "Prisoner"
- "Woman Me"
- "John J."
- "Southeast Arkansas"
- "Song for the Old Ones"
- "Child Dead in Old Seas"
- "Take Time Out"
- "Elegy"
- "Reverses"
- "Little Girl Speakings"
- "This Winter Day"

== Critical response ==
Reviewer Kathryn Gibbs Harris states that the poems in Oh Pray, like "Child Dead in Old Seas", are good heritage ballads with excellent lyrics. She calls "This Winter Day" colorful and pleasant, and states that it reminds her of a genre painting. She, like many critics about much of Angelou's poetry, says, "The poems work best read aloud". A critic in Booklist considers the way in which the poems are organized distracting, but says that it "does not diminish the street-wise soundings infused with a particular pain and pride". According to the review, the rhyme in "Here's to Adhering" is simple, but its structure is deceptively complex. The critic also says, "The sardonic quality of 'On Reaching Forty' reduces age to a minor milestone; nationhood is elevated to a higher yet deeper plane in 'Africa' and in 'America.' 'The Pusher' is a typical Angelou acceleration, but it is 'Chicken-Licken' that causes a dead halt". Poetry critic Sandra Gilbert says that Angelou's poems, "when they're not awkward or stilted, are corny".

According to a reviewer in Choice, the poems in Oh Pray focus on themes of love, insight, and tension. They also focus on "the black condition celebrated triumphant over difficulties". The reviewer finds some poems uneven, sometimes banal, also best if read aloud, and meant to "be reread and laughed over and thought about". Reviewer James Finn Cotter states that this volume suffers from "the dangers of success" that happen when poets gain too much fame too soon. Gilbert blames Angelou's publishers for capitalizing on her success as an autobiographer, stating that Oh Pray "...is such a painfully untalented collection of poems that I can't think of any reason other than the Maya myth for it to be in print". Writer Lyman B. Hagen responds to Gilbert's criticism by stating that Angelou had been a poet long before she began writing prose and that Angelou's audience is comfortable with her sparse lines. He insists that Angelou's critics have missed the power of her poems' message in her apparently simple lines. Hagen calls Angelou's poetry light verse and states that she writes about ordinary objects and experiences, and with deep feelings, about a variety of racial themes and concerns.
