= We Had Him =

Poem about Michael Jackson by Maya Angelou

"We Had Him" is a poem written by Maya Angelou about Michael Jackson. The poem was written for Jackson's memorial service on July 7, 2009, and read there by Queen Latifah in front of the approximately 2.5 to 3 billion worldwide viewers watching the memorial service.
