= And Still I Rise =

Volume of poetry by Maya Angelou

And Still I Rise 1 (poem)
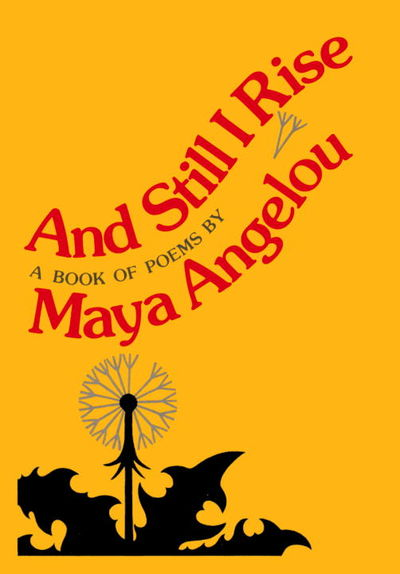
- First edition
- Author: Maya Angelou
- Language: English
- Genre: Poetry
- Publisher: Random House
- Publication date: 12 August 1978
- Publication place: United States
- Media type: Print (hardcover and paperback)
- ISBN: 978-0394502526
- Preceded by: Oh Pray My Wings Are Gonna Fit Me Well
- Followed by: Shaker, Why Don't You Sing?

And Still I Rise is author Maya Angelou's third volume of poetry, published by Random House in 1978. It was published during one of the most productive periods in Angelou's career; she had written three autobiographies and published two other volumes of poetry up to that point. Angelou considered herself a poet and a playwright, but was best known for her seven autobiographies, especially her first, I Know Why the Caged Bird Sings, although her poetry has also been successful. She began, early in her writing career, alternating the publication of an autobiography and a volume of poetry.

And Still I Rise is made up of 32 short poems, divided into three parts. The poems' themes focus on a hopeful determination to rise above difficulty and discouragement, and on many of the same topics as Angelou's autobiographies and previous volumes of poetry. Two of her most well-known and popular poems, "Phenomenal Woman" and "Still I Rise", are found in this volume. She speaks for her race and gender in many of the poems, and again emphasizes the strength and resiliency of her community. Like her previous volumes of poetry, the reviews of And Still I Rise were mixed.

The collection's title poem, "Still I Rise", was the center of an advertising campaign for the United Negro College Fund. Two others, "Phenomenal Woman" and "Just For a Time", were previously published in Cosmopolitan. "Phenomenal Woman" was one of Angelou's poems featured in the film Poetic Justice.

== Background ==
And Still I Rise is Maya Angelou's third volume of poetry. She studied and began writing poetry at a young age. After her rape at the age of eight, as recounted in her first autobiography, I Know Why the Caged Bird Sings (1969), she dealt with her trauma by memorizing and reciting great works of literature, including poetry, which helped bring her out of her self-imposed muteness.

The publication of And Still I Rise occurred during one of the most productive periods of Angelou's career. She had written musical for Roberta Flack and had composed movie scores. She had written articles, short stories, television scripts and documentaries, autobiographies, and poetry; she produced plays; and she was named a visiting professor of several colleges and universities. In 1977, Angelou appeared in a supporting role in the television mini-series Roots. She was given a multitude of awards during this period, including over thirty honorary degrees from colleges and universities from all over the world.

Although Angelou considered herself a playwright and poet when her editor Robert Loomis challenged her to write Caged Bird, she was best known for her autobiographies. Many of Angelou's readers identify her as a poet first and an autobiographer second, but like Lynn Z. Bloom, many critics consider her autobiographies more important than her poetry. Critic William Sylvester agrees, and states that although her books have been best-sellers, her poetry has "received little serious critical attention". Bloom also believes that Angelou's poetry was more interesting when she recited it. Bloom calls her performances "characteristically dynamic" and says that Angelou "moves exuberantly, vigorously to reinforce the rhythms of the lines, the tone of the words. Her singing and dancing and electrifying stage presence transcend the predictable words and phrases".

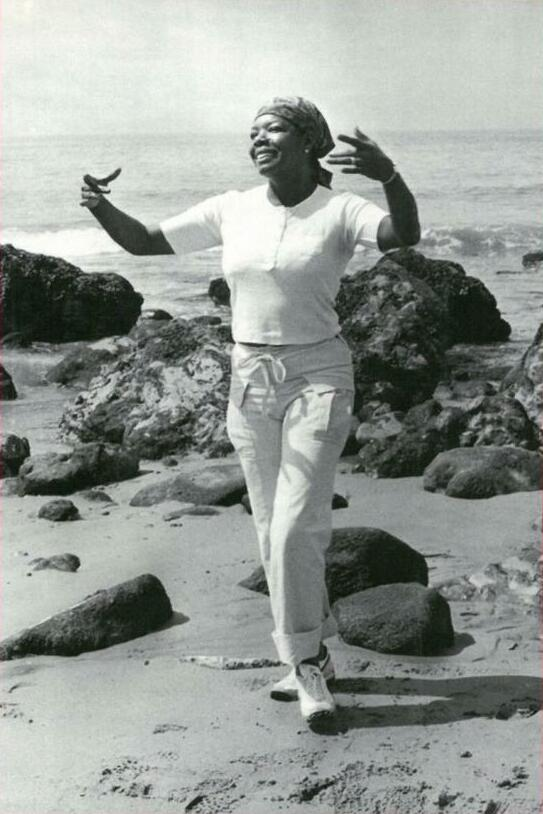
Portrait of Angelou from the first edition of And Still I Rise

Angelou began, early in her writing career, alternating the publication of an autobiography and a volume of poetry. By the time And Still I Rise was published in 1978, she had published three autobiographies, eventually going on to publish seven. In 1993, she read her poem "On the Pulse of Morning" at President Bill Clinton's inauguration. The following year, her publisher, Random House, placed the poems in And Still I Rise in her first collection of poetry, The Complete Collected Poems of Maya Angelou. Also in the 1994 collection were her two previous collections, Just Give Me a Cool Drink of Water 'fore I Diiie (1971) and Oh Pray My Wings Are Gonna Fit Me Well, along with her two volumes published afterwards, Shaker, Why Don't You Sing? (1983) and I Shall Not Be Moved (1990). Angelou's publisher placed four poems in a smaller volume, entitled Phenomenal Woman, in 1995.

Two of the poems in And Still I Rise, "Phenomenal Woman" and "Just For a Time", appeared in Cosmopolitan in 1978. In 1994, the title poem, "Still I Rise", was part of an advertising campaign for the 50th anniversary of the United Negro College Fund.

== Themes ==
According to scholar Carol E. Neubauer, the themes in the poems in And Still I Rise, as the title of the volume suggests, focus on a hopeful determination to rise above difficulty and discouragement. Neubauer says, "These poems are inspired and spoken by a confident voice of strength that recognizes its own power and will no longer be pushed into passivity". Angelou focuses on the same themes as her previous volumes, including love, loneliness, and Southern racism, but with the added twist of the nature of women and the importance of family. They cover a wider range of topics, including springtime, aging, sexual awakening, drug addiction, and Christian salvation.

"Phenomenal Woman", a crowd-pleaser that Angelou often performed for audiences, has been called her "personal theme-poem". Neubauer and literary critic Harold Bloom both consider it one of the best poems in the volume. The poem was featured in the motion picture Poetic Justice (1993), directed by John Singleton. Bloom calls it a "hymn-like poem to woman's beauty". Angelou "skillfully engages" in some word-play with the word "phenomenally". As Angelou often does in her poetry, "Phenomenal Woman" is paired with the one that follows it, "Men", in which Angelou uses a raw egg metaphor to contrast dominant masculinity with fragile and cautious femininity. She celebrates both "her slightly mysterious power" and the excitement created by men. The poem is characteristic of Angelou's style, with terse and forceful lines and irregular rhymes. The short and often monosyllabic words, as Neubauer states, "create an even, provocative rhythm that resounds with underlying confidence". Angelou said that she wrote the poem for all women, regardless of their race or appearance. She also said, "Now, I know men are phenomenal, but they have to write their own poem".

Many of Angelou's poems focus on racial subjects and themes. They continue the themes of mild protest and survival also found in her autobiographies, and inject hope through humor. In "Ain't That Bad?", she uses the Black English vernacular word "bad" to connote positive connections with Black culture, mores, customs, and leaders, and to help build Black pride. Scholar Lyman B. Hagen calls it a "shouting poem" due to its short lines and repetition. In "Lady Luncheon Club", Angelou humorously describes an overly intellectual speaker at a woman's club.

Critic Robert B. Stepto says that the poem "One More Round" is heavily influenced by the work and protest songs of the past. The even-number stanzas in the eight-stanza poem create a refrain like those found in many work songs and are variations of many protest poems. He is impressed with the creation of a new art form out of work and protest forms, but does not feel that Angelou develops it enough.

In Angelou's favorite poem, "Still I Rise", which shares its title with a play she wrote in 1976, she refers to the indomitable spirit of Black people, using repetition and the categorization of injustices against them. She quoted it during interviews and often included it in her public readings. Despite adversity and racism, Angelou expresses her faith that one will overcome and triumph. Hagen compares "Still I Rise" with spirituals that express hope. As she does in "Phenomenal Woman" and throughout her poetry and autobiographies, Angelou speaks not only for herself, but for her entire gender and race. Reviewer Ellen Lippmann calls "Still I Rise" a "proud, even defiant statement on behalf of all Black people". Angelou, during an interview in 1997, stated that she used the poem to help sustain her during hard times, and that many people, both Black and white, used it in the same way.

Two of the poems in And Still I Rise, "Woman Work" and "Momma's Welfare Roll", speak about women positively. "Woman Work", without explaining or complaining, lists the mundane chores a stay-at-home wife and mother must accomplish. Neubauer compares the poem to "Phenomenal Woman", both of which share the same strong rhyme scheme, forceful rhythms, and theme of women's vitality. In "Momma Welfare Roll", Angelou speaks about the courage of a mother who goes on welfare, and acknowledges the demeaning turmoil she experiences when accepting government assistance.

== Reviews ==
Like many reviewers of Angelou's poetry, Ellen Lippmann of School Library Journal finds Angelou's prose stronger than her poetry, but found her strength more apparent in the poems in this volume than it was in her first autobiography. Mary Silva Cosgrave, in her review in Horn Book Magazine, praises Angelou for finding rhythm in everyday life and is impressed with the poems in And Still I Rise, especially "Phenomenal Woman"; Cosgrave states, "To her third collection of poems the author has brought a life full of zest and style that is phenomenally her own". Harold Bloom states that although "Phenomenal Woman" has received few reviews, it is one of the most popular and powerful poems Angelou recites in her public appearances.

Stepto considers the poems in And Still I Rise as slight and "thin stuff", and expresses his disbelief that Angelou's poems would be produced by a major publishing house while poetry written by other lesser-known talents could not. He is able to see the possibilities of what he considered good poetry in her writing, and states that her best poems borrow "various folk rhythms and forms and thereby buttresses her poems by evoking aspects of a culture's written and unwritten heritage". He places Angelou's work in the tradition of other Black poets, and compares the poems in And Still I Rise to the works of Langston Hughes, Gwendolyn Brooks, and Sterling Brown. For example, many of Angelou's poems remind Stepto of Brown's poems. "Still I Rise" reminds Stepto of Brown's most famous poem, "Strong Men". Stepto explains Angelou's success and popularity as a poet with her autobiographies, which he calls "marvelous" and the real reason for her success as a poet. He states that her poetry serves as explanatory texts for her prose works, which he calls "more adeptly rendered self-portraits".

Joyce Boyarin Blundell is positive in her review of And Still I Rise in Library Journal. She recognizes many of the same themes in Angelou's autobiographies, but calls the poems in this volume uneven. Blundell finds the poems similar to speech patterns and songs the most effective, while she finds others "mired in hackneyed metaphor and forced rhyme". Despite the volume's weaknesses, she considers it successful as a statement of a Black woman's experiences and of her determination to survive and grow.

== Poems ==
And Still I Rise consists of 32 poems, divided into three parts. The first part, entitled "Touch Me, Life, Not Softly", has been called "joyful" and affirms the poet's strength as a woman and as a lover. Part Two, "Traveling", focus on the hardships, such as drug addiction, child abuse, inner-city life, and conditions in the Old South, that the author and others have experienced. Part Three, "And Still I Rise", which gets its name from the volume's title poem, reiterates the themes in Part One and emphasizes the strength she finds in herself and in her community. The volume is dedicated to Jessica Mitford, Gerard W. Purcell, and Jay Allen, whom Angelou calls "a few of the Good Guys".

Part One: Touch Me, Life, Not Softly

- "A Kind of Love, Some Say"
- "Country Lover"
- "Remembrance"
- "Where We Belong, A Duet"
- "Phenomenal Woman"
- "Men"
- "Refusal"
- "Just for a Time"

Part Two: Traveling

- "Junkie Monkey Reel"
- "The Lesson"
- "California Prodigal"
- "My Arkansas"
- "Through the Inner City to the Suburbs"
- "Lady Luncheon Club"
- "Momma Welfare Roll"
- "The Singer Will Not Sing"
- "Willie"
- "To Beat the Child Was Bad Enough"
- "Woman Work"
- "One More Round"
- "The Traveler"
- "Kin"
- "The Memory"

Part Three: And Still I Rise

- "Still I Rise"
- "Ain't That Bad?"
- "Life Doesn't Frighten Me"
- "Bump d'Bump"
- "On Aging"
- "In Retrospect"
- "Just Like Job"
- "Call Letters: Mrs. V. B."
- "Thank You, Lord"
