= Mother: A Cradle to Hold Me =

Collection of poems by Maya Angelou

Mother: A Cradle to Hold Me is a 2006 collection of poems by Maya Angelou, praising mothers. The book entered The New York Times Best Seller list the week of May 21, 2006 at number thirteen.
