= A Brave and Startling Truth =

Book by Maya Angelou

"A Brave and Startling Truth" is a poem by Maya Angelou. Critic Richard Long called it her "second 'public' poem". Angelou delivered it in June 1995, at the 50th anniversary commemoration of the United Nations, two years after she read "On the Pulse of Morning" at the inauguration of President Bill Clinton, which made her the first poet to make an inaugural recitation since Robert Frost at John F. Kennedy's inauguration in 1961. Later that year, her publisher Random House published an edition of the poem.

In 2014, the poem Brave and Startling Truth by Angelou was among several works of art, including a recording of We Shall Overcome arranged by Nolan Williams, Jr. and featuring mezzo-soprano Denyce Graves sent to space on the first test flight of the spacecraft Orion.
