= Robert Loomis =

American book editor (1926–2020)

- Born: August 24, 1926; Conneaut, Ohio, US
- Died: April 19, 2020 (aged 93); Stony Brook, New York, US
- Occupation: Book editor
- Spouse: Hilary Mills
- Children: 2

Robert Duane Loomis (August 24, 1926 – April 19, 2020) was an American book editor who worked at Random House from 1957 until his retirement in 2011. He has been called "one of publishing's hall of fame editors."

Many of Loomis's authors had worked with him for decades, including Maya Angelou, who wrote 31 books under his editorship, beginning with her first autobiography, I Know Why the Caged Bird Sings (1969). His authors' loyalty to him, and his to them, was almost legendary. Loomis represented "the classic mold of the editor" and according to Random House, he "embodied the ideal of an old-fashioned editor: understated, but uncanny; polite, but persistent". As Angelou said, Loomis "knows what I hope to achieve in all my work. I don't know anybody as fierce, simply fierce, but he's as tender as he's tough." He was well known as a mentor to editors and writers in all areas of the publishing industry.

Other notable authors who have been edited by Loomis include Calvin Trillin, Edmund Morris (who wrote Dutch, the "controversial" biography of US President Ronald Reagan), Shelby Foote, Jonathan Harr, and anchorman Jim Lehrer. He edited the Vietnam War epic, A Bright Shining Lie, by Neil Sheehan, which won both the Pulitzer Prize and the National Book Award, and in 1998, the novel he edited for Pete Dexter, Paris Trout, earned the National Book Award, "an unprecedented feat in editing."

Loomis and author William Styron had known each other since they were both students at Duke University, where Loomis was Styron's editor at Duke's student magazine. Loomis went on to edit all of Styron's books except Lie Down in Darkness, his first novel.

== Personal life ==
Loomis was married to Hilary Mills, who wrote a biography about Norman Mailer. He was a certified pilot. Loomis died on April 19, 2020, in Stony Brook, New York, after a fall.
