= On the Pulse of Morning =

Poem by Maya Angelou

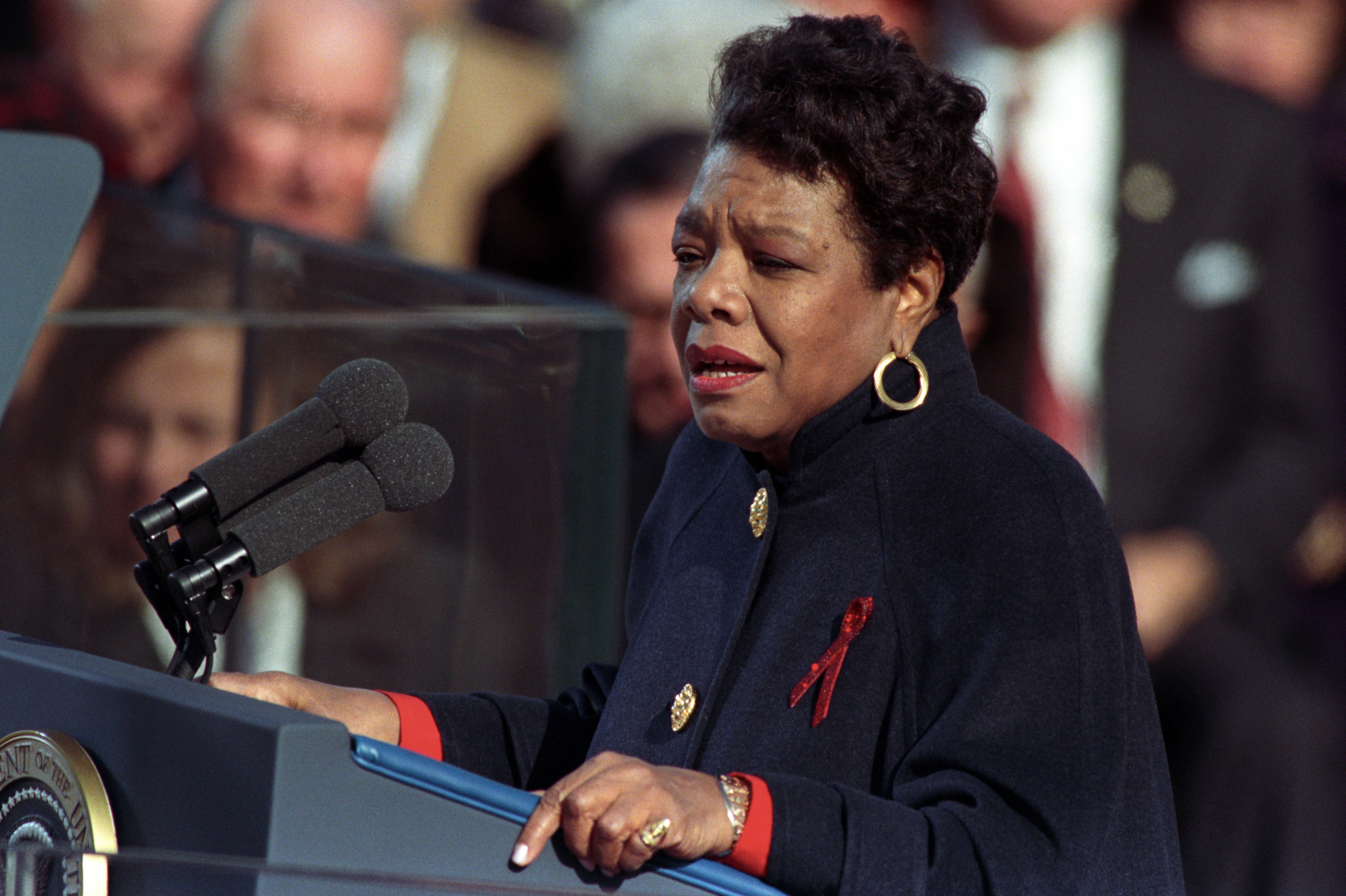
Angelou reciting "On the Pulse of Morning" at the first inauguration of Bill Clinton in 1993

"On the Pulse of Morning" is a poem by writer and poet Maya Angelou that she read at the first inauguration of President Bill Clinton on January 20, 1993. With her public recitation, Angelou became the second poet in history to read a poem at a presidential inauguration, and the first African American and woman. (Robert Frost was the first inaugural poet, at the 1961 inauguration of John F. Kennedy.) Angelou's audio recording of the poem won the 1994 Grammy Award in the "Best Spoken Word" category, resulting in more fame and recognition for her previous works, and broadening her appeal.

The poem's themes are change, inclusion, responsibility, and role of both the President and the citizenry in establishing economic security. Its symbols, references to contemporary issues, and personification of nature has inspired critics to compare "On the Pulse of Morning" with Frost's inaugural poem and with Clinton's inaugural address. It has been called Angelou's "autobiographical poem", and has received mixed reviews. The popular press praised Clinton's choice of Angelou as inaugural poet, and her "representiveness" of the American people and its president. Critic Mary Jane Lupton said that "Angelou's ultimate greatness will be attributed" to the poem, and that Angelou's "theatrical" performance of it, using skills she learned as an actor and speaker, marked a return to the African-American oral tradition of speakers such as Frederick Douglass, Martin Luther King Jr. and Malcolm X.

== Background ==
When Angelou wrote and recited "On the Pulse of Morning", she was already well known as a writer and poet. She had written five of the seven of her series of autobiographies, including the first and most highly acclaimed, I Know Why the Caged Bird Sings (1969). Although she was best known for her autobiographies, she was primarily known as a poet rather than an autobiographer. Early in her writing career, she began alternating the publication of an autobiography and a volume of poetry. Her first volume of poetry, Just Give Me a Cool Drink of Water 'Fore I Diiie, published in 1971 shortly after Caged Bird, became a best-seller. As scholar Marcia Ann Gillespie and her colleagues write, Angelou had "fallen in love with poetry" during her early childhood in Stamps, Arkansas. After her rape at the age of eight, which she depicted in Caged Bird, Angelou memorized and studied great works of literature, including poetry. According to Caged Bird, her friend Mrs. Flowers encouraged her to recite them, which helped bring her out of her self-imposed period of muteness caused by her trauma.

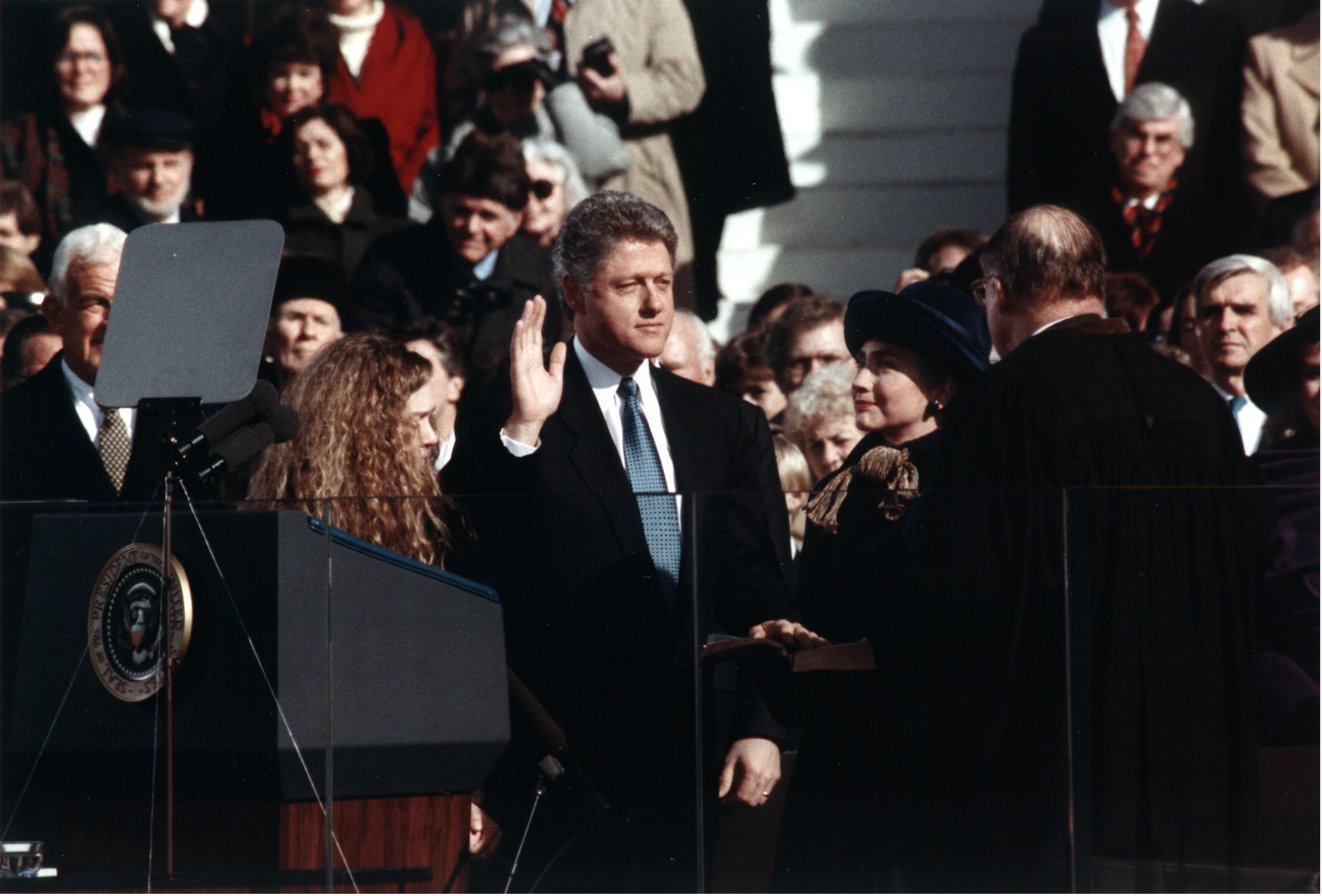
President Bill Clinton (with Chelsea Clinton and Hillary Clinton), taking the oath of office during his inauguration in 1993

Angelou was the first poet to read an inaugural poem since Robert Frost read his poem "The Gift Outright" at President John F. Kennedy's inauguration in 1961, and the first Black woman. (Note: The second Black woman, Elizabeth Alexander, recited her poem "Praise Song for the Day" at President Barack Obama's inauguration in 2009.) When it was announced that Angelou would read one of her poems at Clinton's inauguration, many in the popular press compared her role as inaugural poet with that of Frost, especially what critic Zofia Burr called their "representativeness" or their ability to speak for and to the American people. The press also pointed to the nation's social progress that a Black woman would "stand in the place of a white man" at his inauguration, and praised Angelou's involvement as the Clinton administration's "gesture of inclusion".

Angelou told her friend Oprah Winfrey that the call requesting her to write and recite the poem came shortly after Clinton's election from television producer Harry Thomason, who organized the inauguration. Even though she suspected that Clinton made the request because "he understood that I am the kind of person who really does bring people together", Angelou admitted feeling overwhelmed, and requested that the audiences attending her speaking engagements pray for her.

Angelou followed the same "writing ritual" that she had used for many years to write all of her books and poetry: she rented a hotel room, sequestered herself there from early morning to afternoon, and wrote on legal pads. After deciding upon the theme "America", she wrote down everything she could think of about the country, which she then "pushed and squeezed into a poetic form". Angelou recited the poem on January 20, 1993.

== Themes ==
"On the Pulse of Morning" shared many themes with President Clinton's inaugural address, which he gave immediately before Angelou read her poem, including change, responsibility, and the President's and the citizenry's roles in establishing economic security. The symbols in Angelou's poem (the tree, the river, and the morning, for example) paralleled many of the symbols Clinton used in his speech and helped enhance and expand Clinton's imagery. Clinton's address and the poem, according to Hagen, both emphasized unity despite the diversity of American culture. "On the Pulse of Morning" attempted to convey many of the goals of Clinton's new administration.

..."On the Pulse of Morning" is an autobiographical poem, one that emerges from her conflicts as an American; her experiences as traveler; her achievements in public speaking and acting; and her wisdom, gleaned from years of self-exploration".

— African-American literature scholar Mary Jane Lupton

Burr compared Angelou's poem with Frost's, something she claimed the poetry critics who gave "On the Pulse of Morning" negative reviews did not do. Angelou "rewrote" Frost's poem from the perspective of a personified nature that appeared in both poems. Frost praised American colonization, but Angelou attacked it. The cost of the creation of America was abstract and ambiguous in Frost's poem, but the personified Tree in Angelou's poem signified the cultures in America that paid a high price to create it. Both Frost and Angelou called for a "break with the past", but Frost wanted to relive it, and Angelou wanted to confront its mistakes. Burr also compared Angelou's poem with Audre Lorde's poem "For Each of You", which has similar themes of looking towards the future, as well as with Walt Whitman's "Song of Myself" and Langston Hughes' "The Negro Speaks of Rivers". According to Hagen, the poem contains a recurring theme in many of Angelou's other poems and autobiographies, that "we are more alike than unalike". (Note: The line, "We are more alike than we are unlike," appears in Angelou's poem, "Human Family", published in I Shall Not Be Moved (1990), her fifth book of poetry.)

"On the Pulse of Morning" was full of contemporary references, including toxic waste and pollution. Angelou's poem was influenced by the African-American oral tradition of spirituals, by poets such as James Weldon Johnson and Langston Hughes, and by modern African poets and folk artists such as Kwesi Brew and Efua Sutherland, which also influenced her autobiographies.

== Critical response, impact, and legacy ==
According to Lupton, "On the Pulse of Morning" is Angelou's most famous poem. Lupton has argued that "Angelou's ultimate greatness will be attributed" to the poem, and that Angelou's "theatrical" performance of it, using skills she learned as an actor and speaker, marked a return to the African-American oral tradition of speakers such as Frederick Douglass, Martin Luther King Jr., and Malcolm X. British reporter Kate Kellaway compared Angelou's appearance as she read the poem at Clinton's inauguration with the eight-year-old child in Caged Bird, noting that the coats she wore on both occasions were similar: "She looked magnificent, sternly theatrical with an unsmiling bow mouth. She wore a coat with brass buttons, a strange reminder of the eight-year-old Maya Angelou who stood in a courtroom, terrified at the sight of the man who had raped her". Gillespie stated regarding Kellaway's observations: "But standing tall on the steps of the Capitol, she was light-years removed from that terrible time, and America was no longer an 'unfriendly place.' Her poem 'On the Pulse of Morning' was a soaring call for peace, justice, and harmony. Capturing the hope embodied in the human spirit, it was a solemn and joyful reminder that all things are possible. She wished us 'Good morning' in her poem, and one felt as if a new day was truly dawning."

Angelou recognized that although "On the Pulse of Morning" was a better "public poem" than a great poem, her goal of conveying the message of unity was accomplished. Poet David Lehman agreed, stating that although it fulfilled its theatrical and political objectives, the poem was "not very memorable". Poet Sterling D. Plumpp found Angelou's performance "brilliant", but was "not as enthusiastic about it as a text". Burr stated that the negative reviews of Angelou's poem, like the majority of the reviews about her other poetry, were due to their elitism and narrow views of poetry, which were limited to written forms rather than spoken ones like "On the Pulse of Morning", which was written to be recited aloud and performed. Burr compared the response of literary critics to Angelou's poem with critics of Frost's poem: "Frost's powerful reading served to supplement the poem in the sense of enhancing it, while Angelou's powerful reading of her poem supplemented it in the sense of making evident its inadequacy and lack."

Angelou's recitation of "On the Pulse of Morning" resulted in more fame and recognition for her previous works, and broadened her appeal "across racial, economic, and educational boundaries". The week after Angelou's recitation, sales of the paperback version of her books and poetry rose by 300–600 percent. Bantam Books had to reprint 400,000 copies of all her books to keep up with the demand. Random House, which published Angelou's hardcover books and published the poem later that year, reported that it sold more of her books in January 1993 than in all of 1992, accounting for a 1200 percent increase. The sixteen-page publication of the poem became a best-seller, and the recording of the poem was awarded a Grammy Award.

"On the Pulse of Morning" was featured in the film August 28: A Day in the Life of a People, which debuted at the opening of the Smithsonian's National Museum of African American History and Culture in 2016.

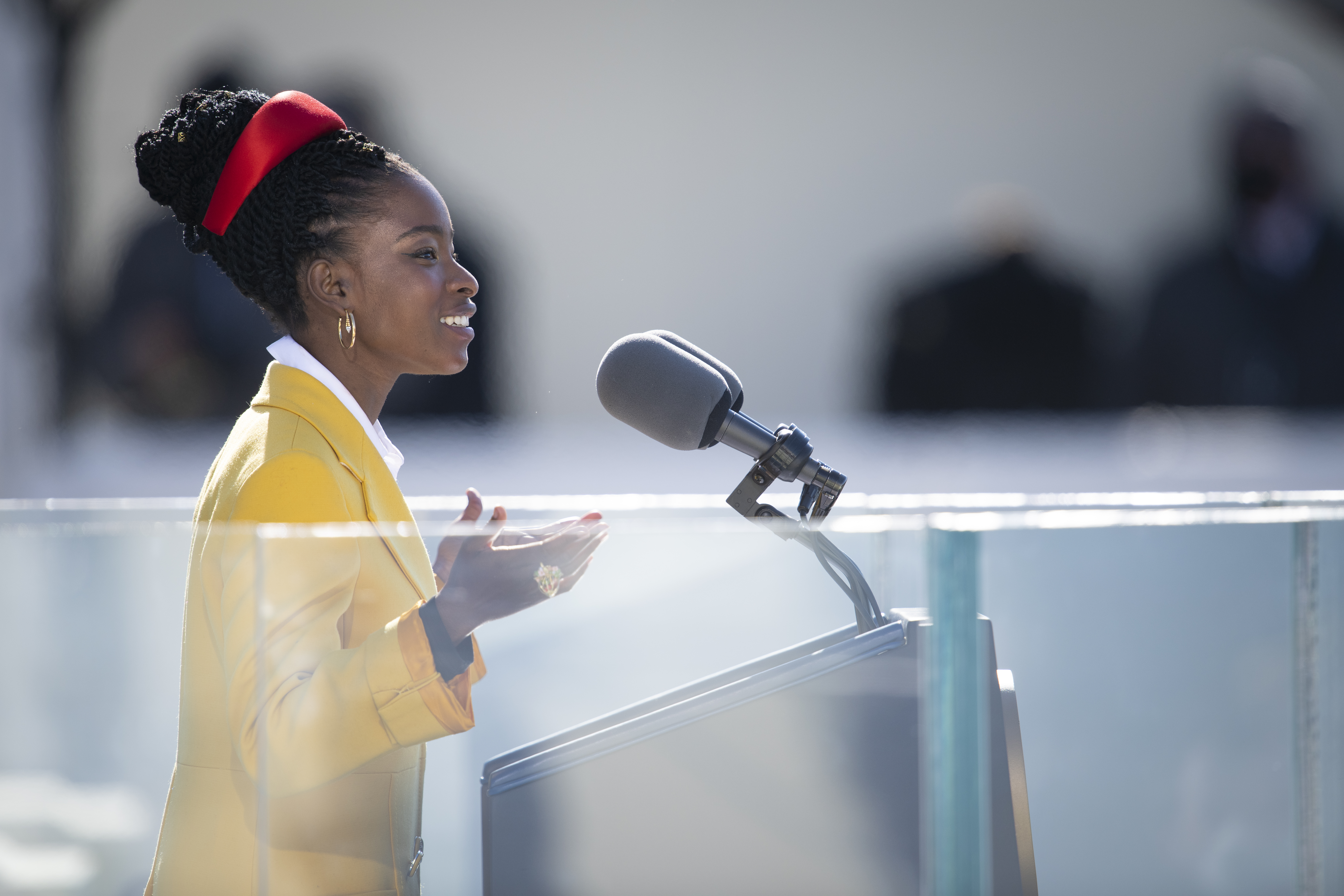
Amanda Gorman, reciting her poem, "The Hill We Climb," during Joe Biden's presential inauguration ceremony (January 20, 2021)..

Angelou's poem has been compared to "The Hill We Climb", the poem written by Amanda Gorman at the 2021 presidential inauguration of Joe Biden. Gorman, like Angelou, emphasized the contradictions humans experience, including acknowledging the country's shortcomings while "also honoring the integrity of American ideals". Gorman, during a 2021 interview with Winfrey, credited Angelou and other black women, including Toni Morrison and Winfrey, for her successes. Gorman told Winfrey that every morning during her senior year of college, she "grounded herself" by reading "On the Pulse of Morning." Gorman, who grew up with a speech impediment, also connected with Angelou's childhood muteness, calling it "a real beacon for me in my life".

"On the Pulse of Morning" inspired composer Dolores White's composition, "Give Birth to the Dream," which was written in 1997 and commissioned by the Cleveland Orchestra.

== See also ==
- List of United States presidential inaugural poems
- United States presidential inauguration § Poems
