= Mom & Me & Mom =

2013 autobiographical book by Maya Angelou

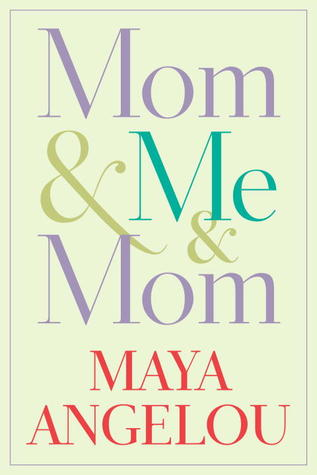
- The hardcover version
- Author: Maya Angelou
- Language: English
- Genre: Autobiography
- Published: 2013 (Random House)
- Publication place: United States
- Media type: Print
- ISBN: 1-4000-6611-5
- Preceded by: A Song Flung Up to Heaven

Mom & Me & Mom (2013) is the seventh and final book in author Maya Angelou's series of autobiographies. The book was published shortly before Mother's Day and Angelou's 85th birthday. It focuses, for the first time in her books, on Angelou's relationship with her mother, Vivian Baxter. The book explains Baxter's behavior, especially Baxter's abandonment of Angelou and Angelou's older brother when they were young children, and fills in "what are possibly the final blanks in Angelou's eventful life". The book also chronicles Angelou's reunion and reconciliation with Baxter.

Mom & Me & Mom is an overview of Angelou's life and revisits many of the same anecdotes she relates in her previous books. The first section, entitled "Mom & Me", centers on Angelou's early years, before the age of 17, and her transition from resentment and distrust of her mother to acceptance, support, and love towards her. After Baxter helps her through the birth of her son, Angelou goes from calling Baxter "Lady" to "Mom". In the book's second section, entitled "Me & Mom", Angelou chronicles the unconditional love, support, and assistance they gave to each other, as Baxter helps her through single motherhood, a failed marriage, and career ups and downs. As she had begun to do in I Know Why the Caged Bird Sings, and continued throughout her series, Angelou upheld the long traditions of African-American autobiography. At the same time she made a deliberate attempt to challenge the usual structure of the autobiography by critiquing, changing, and expanding the genre. She had become recognized and highly respected as a spokesperson for Black people and women. Angelou was, as scholar Joanne Braxton has stated, "without a doubt, ... America's most visible black woman autobiographer". She had also become "a major autobiographical voice of the time".

Like Angelou's previous autobiographies, Mom & Me & Mom received mostly positive reviews. Most reviewers state that Baxter is presented well in the book. Angelou celebrates the unconditional acceptance and support of her mother, who comes across "as a street-smart, caring woman who shaped the author's life and legacy by her words and example". The book has been called "a profoundly moving tale of separation and reunion, and an ultimately optimistic portrait of the maternal bond".

Pictures of Angelou, Baxter, and members of their family appear through the book. An audio version, read by Angelou, was released in CD form and as a digital download.

== Background ==
Mom & Me & Mom (2013) is the seventh of Maya Angelou's series of autobiographies. It was completed 11 years after the publication of her previous autobiography, A Song Flung Up to Heaven (2002), (Note: At the time of Song's publication, it was considered the final installment of her series of autobiographies.) and more than forty years after she wrote her first autobiography, I Know Why the Caged Bird Sings (1969). Mom & Me & Mom, in which Angelou relates her relationship with her mother Vivian Baxter, was published shortly before Mother's Day and Angelou's 85th birthday. In the time period between the publication of her sixth and seventh autobiographies, Angelou was the first African-American woman and living poet selected by Sterling Publishing, who placed 25 of her poems in a volume of their Poetry for Young People series in 2004. In 2009, Angelou wrote "We Had Him", a poem about Michael Jackson, which was read by Queen Latifah at his funeral, and wrote "His Day is Done", a poem honoring Nelson Mandela after his death in 2013. She published a book of essays, Letter to My Daughter, in 2009, and two cookbooks, Hallelujah! The Welcome Table in 2004 and Great Food, All Day Long in 2010. During this period, she was awarded the Lincoln Medal in 2008 and the Presidential Medal of Freedom in 2011.

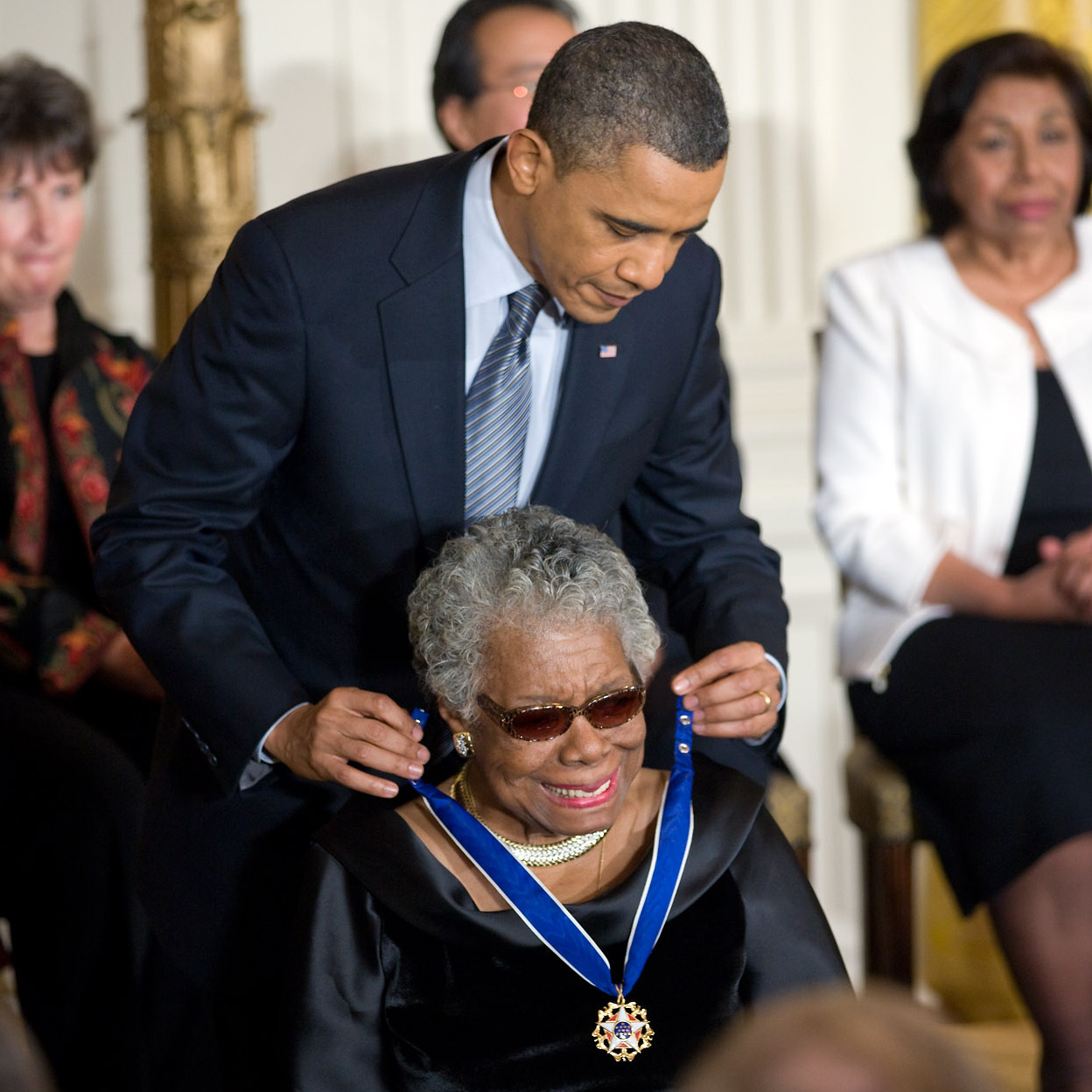
President Barack Obama presenting Angelou with the Presidential Medal of Freedom, 2011

Angelou had become recognized and highly respected as a spokesperson for Blacks and women and was, as scholar Joanne Braxton has stated, "without a doubt, ... America's most visible black woman autobiographer". She had also become "a major autobiographical voice of the time". Angelou was one of the first African-American female writers to publicly discuss her personal life, and one of the first to use herself as a central character in her books. Writer Julian Mayfield, who called her first autobiography "a work of art that eludes description", stated that Angelou's series set a precedent not only for other Black women writers, but for the genre of autobiography as a whole. Scholar Hilton Als called Angelou one of the "pioneers of self-exposure", willing to focus honestly on the more negative aspects of her personality and choices. For example, while Angelou was composing her second autobiography, Gather Together in My Name, she was concerned about how her readers would react to her disclosure that she had been a prostitute. Her husband Paul Du Feu talked her into publishing the book by encouraging her to "tell the truth as a writer" and to "be honest about it".

For the first time, Angelou focuses on her relationship with her mother in this book, and fills in what reviewer Fiona Sturges calls "possibly the final blanks in Angelou's eventful life". According to Candace Smith, who reviewed the audio version of the book for Booklist, Angelou and Baxter's relationship was "touched upon but never fully described" in Caged Bird, but Mom & Me & Mom explains Baxter's actions, especially the reasons she sent Angelou and her older brother Bailey to live with their grandmother in Stamps, Arkansas. The book also chronicles Angelou's initial uncomfortable reunion and eventual reconciliation with Baxter. Pictures of Baxter, Angelou, and their family and close friends appear throughout the book and enhance the text. An audio version of the book, read by Angelou, was released in CD form and as a digital download.

Angelou explains in the book's prologue why she wrote the book, which was to explain how she became, despite being born poor, Black, and female, a renowned author and poet. The book is divided into two sections: the first 13 chapters are grouped into the first section, called "Mom & Me", and the remaining chapters make up the second section, called "Me & Mom". Angelou thanks her mother, "who generously taught me how to be a mother", which allowed her to dedicate the book to her son, Guy Bailey Johnson, whom she calls "one of the most courageous and generous men I know".

== Plot summary ==
Love heals. Heals and liberates. I use the word love, not meaning sentimentality, but a condition so strong that it may be that which holds the stars in their heavenly positions and that which causes the blood to flow orderly in our veins. This book has been written to examine some of the ways love heals and helps a person to climb impossible heights and rise from immeasurable depths".

— Maya Angelou, in the prologue to Mom & Me & Mom

Angelou's mother, Vivian Baxter, was born in St. Louis, Missouri, at the turn of the 20th century, the oldest of six children of her Trinidadian father and her Irish mother. Baxter's family was violent, yet religious and musical. Baxter, "who was to remain a startling beauty", met Angelou's father, Bailey Johnson, a dietitian and cook, in 1924, upon Johnson's return from serving in World War I. They married and moved to California, where Angelou and her older brother, Bailey, Jr., were born. When she was three and Bailey was five, their parents divorced and sent their children, by train with identification tags and no adult supervision, to live with their paternal grandmother, Annie Henderson, in Stamps, Arkansas.

Angelou and her brother lived with their grandmother and her son, Uncle Willie, until Angelou was thirteen. They briefly visited their mother in St. Louis, but at the age of eight Angelou was raped, and in retaliation the rapist was killed by members of her family. She felt so guilty for his death that she chose to stop talking to everyone but Bailey for several years. They were sent back to Stamps, but when Bailey turned 14, they returned to their mother's care in San Francisco for his protection. At first, Angelou was resistant and angry towards her mother for abandoning her and Bailey, choosing to call her "Lady", and it took her several years to warm to her.

One summer, Bailey and Angelou made separate trips to visit their father in San Diego, in what Kirkus Reviews called "a seriously ugly meeting". Angelou did not get along with her stepmother. During her visit, her father took Angelou to Mexico; he became so drunk, she had to drive him back across the border, even though she had never driven a car before. When they returned to San Diego, Angelou's stepmother cut Angelou with a pair of scissors during an argument. Angelou chose to live on the streets until her wound was healed. When she returned to San Francisco, she decided she wanted a job as a streetcar conductor; at first, she was not hired because she was Black, but upon her mother's encouragement, she was persistent with the streetcar company until she became the first Black to work on the railway. Baxter provided security by following Angelou with a pistol.

When Angelou was seventeen, she became pregnant after a one-time encounter with a neighbor boy. She told Bailey, who advised her to hide it from their mother and stepfather until she graduated from high school. Three weeks before the birth of her son, she told them. Baxter's reaction was to run a bath; as Angelou said, "In our family, for some unknown reason, we consider it an honor to run a bath, to put in bubbles and good scents for another person". Baxter helped Angelou through the birth; from then on, Angelou began to call her "Mother", and later, "Mom".

The rest of the book consists of a series of anecdotes about the ways that Baxter supported and accepted her daughter and continued to win her love and respect, through unwed motherhood, a failed marriage, and career ups and downs. Angelou relates several stories of Baxter, including her support of Angelou as an independent single mother, her life-saving intervention after a jealous ex-boyfriend beat Angelou, and her initial resistance and then acceptance of Angelou's first marriage to Greek sailor Tosh Angelos. Angelou recounts the beginning of her career as a dancer and entertainer in San Francisco; Baxter cared for her grandson as Angelou traveled Europe as a member of the Gershwin opera Porgy and Bess. Angelou felt so guilty about leaving her son that she returned and resumed her relationship with her mother and son, eventually moving to New York City and starting a new career as a writer and poet.

I took her hand and said, "I've been told some people need to be given permission to leave. I don't know if you are waiting, but I can say you may have done all you came here to do. You've been a hard worker—white, black, Asian, and Latino women ship out of the San Francisco port because of you. Many men and—if my memory serves me right—a few women risked their lives to love you. You were a terrible mother of small children, but there has never been anyone greater than you as a mother of a young adult".

— Angelou's final words to her mother

Angelou relates, with pride, her mother's social activities, in the Order of the Eastern Star and black women's charitable organizations in Stockton, California, as well as her career as one of the first black female merchant mariners. At one point, Baxter drops everything and comes to her daughter's aid while Angelou was working on a movie in Stockholm. Baxter supports Angelou's decision to live in Africa for a while and then, after Angelou returned to the U.S., to become a teacher at Wake Forest University in Winston-Salem, North Carolina. Angelou describes Baxter's marriage, late in her life, to Angelou's fourth stepfather, whom Baxter called her greatest love and who was Angelou's favorite. There is a difficult scene between Angelou and her brother, who despite his seemingly easy reentry into their mother's life when they were teenagers (she calls them "the new lovers"), had descended into struggles with drug abuse. (Note: Bailey Johnson, Jr., died in 2000 after a series of strokes.)

Angelou closes Mom & Me & Mom with a description of Vivian Baxter's death in 1991, and of Angelou's final words to her on her deathbed. In 1995, the city of Stockton honored Baxter for her many years of service by naming a park after her.

== Style and genre ==
Starting with Caged Bird, Angelou made a deliberate attempt while writing all her autobiographies, including Mom & Me & Mom, to challenge the usual structure of the autobiography by critiquing, changing, and expanding the genre. Her use of fiction-writing techniques such as dialogue, characterization, and thematic development has often led reviewers to categorize her books as autobiographical fiction. Valerie Sayers, in her review of Mom & Me & Mom in The Washington Post, calls Angelou's books memoirs because of their limited focus, but praises her for describing what it was like to grow up Black in "Jim Crow America". Sayers states: "She manages to fully reveal that national sore without picking at it, a neat trick that...requires considerable restraint and her own steely goodwill". Angelou stated in a 1989 interview that she was the only "serious" writer to choose the genre to express herself. As critic Susan Gilbert stated, Angelou was reporting not one person's story, but the collective's. Scholar Selwyn R. Cudjoe agreed, and viewed Angelou as representative of the convention in African-American autobiography as a public gesture that spoke for an entire group of people. Angelou's editor Robert Loomis was able to convince her to write Caged Bird by challenging her to write an autobiography that could be considered "high art", which she continued throughout her series. Although Angelou was successful, she was, as Sayers insisted, smart and gifted enough to write for any audience, but chose not to write for "a highbrow literary audience", but for "readers as open, playful and straightforward as herself".

Angelou's autobiographies conform to the genre's standard structure: they are written by a single author, they are chronological, and they contain elements of character, technique, and theme. In a 1983 interview with African-American literature critic Claudia Tate, Angelou called her books autobiographies. When speaking of her unique use of the genre, she acknowledged that she has followed the slave narrative tradition of "speaking in the first-person singular talking about the first-person plural, always saying I meaning 'we'". Angelou recognized that there were fictional aspects to all her books; she tended to "diverge from the conventional notion of autobiography as truth". Her approach paralleled the conventions of many African-American autobiographies written during the abolitionist period in the US, when truth was often censored for purposes of self-protection. Author Lyman B. Hagen has placed Angelou in the long tradition of African-American autobiography, but insisted that she has created a unique interpretation of the autobiographical form.

In a 1998 interview with journalist George Plimpton, Angelou discussed her writing process, and "the sometimes slippery notion of truth in nonfiction" and memoirs. When asked if she changed the truth to improve her story, she stated, "Sometimes I make a diameter from a composite of three or four people, because the essence in only one person is not sufficiently strong to be written about." Although Angelou has never admitted to changing the facts in her stories, she has used these facts to make an impact with the reader. As Hagen stated, "One can assume that 'the essence of the data' is present in Angelou's work". Hagen also stated that Angelou "fictionalizes, to enhance interest". Angelou's long-time editor, Robert Loomis, states that she could rewrite any of her books by changing the order of her facts to make a different impact on the reader. Like Caged Bird, the events in Mom & Me & Mom and the rest of her autobiographies are episodic and crafted as a series of short stories, yet do not follow a strict chronology, something that Angelou uses to compel her readers forward. Sayers agrees, saying that Angelou pays little attention to chronological order in the book. Sayers also states, "Time races through this narrative". Major characters, like Angelou's stepfather Daddy Clidell, disappear after their initial mention. Even though Angelou repeats many anecdotes found in her earlier autobiographies, the focus in Mom & Me & Mom is on her mother; according to reviewer Stacy Russo, "that focus makes this a distinct addition to Angelou's autobiographical writings". Reviewer Pam Kingsbury, who highly recommended the book for all audiences, stated those familiar with Angelou's previous works "will be rewarded with a more complete picture of her life", while new readers "will discover a well-crafted and insightful introduction to the author".

Critics have judged Mom & Me & Mom and Angelou's other autobiographies "in light of the first", and Caged Bird generally receives the highest praise. Marjorie Kehe of The Christian Science Monitor, considers the book a sequel to Caged Bird. Many of the events described in Angelou's previous autobiographies are revisited in this one, some with more detail than others, such as her period of homelessness, which was described in Caged Bird, and her serious beating by her jealous boyfriend, which was first disclosed in Letter to My Daughter (2008), Angelou's third book of essays. According to Fiona Sturges, who reviewed Mom & Me & Mom in the British publication The Independent, "As in her previous books, these tales are told with clear-sightedness and an absence of self-pity, and they are no less grim for their familiarity. Angelou has never been one for florid prose, and here she maintains a precise and economical style which makes these bleak moments more vivid, like a film from which you can't look away". Sayers states that major dramatic events, such as the incident when Angelou was beaten, "are delivered without much amplification or further reference".

Angelou describes her writing process as regimented. Beginning with Caged Bird, she has used the same "writing ritual" for many years. She gets up at five in the morning and checks into a hotel room, where the staff has been instructed to remove any pictures from the walls. She writes on legal pads while lying on the bed, with a bottle of sherry, a deck of cards to play solitaire, Roget's Thesaurus, and the Bible, and leaves by the early afternoon. She averages 10–12 pages of material a day, which she edits down to three or four pages in the evening. (Note: Angelou describes the first time she used legal pads to write in Mom & Me & Mom.) Angelou goes through this process to "enchant" herself, and as she said in a 1989 interview with the BBC, to "relive the agony, the anguish, the Sturm und Drang". She places herself back in the time she is writing about, even during traumatic experiences like her rape in Caged Bird, to "tell the human truth" about her life. Angelou has stated that she plays cards to reach that place of enchantment, to access her memories more effectively. She has stated, "It may take an hour to get into it, but once I'm in it—ha! It's so delicious!" She does not find the process cathartic; rather, she has found relief in "telling the truth".

== Critical reception ==
Mom & Me & Mom debuted at number 8 on The New York Times bestseller list the week of its release, 21 April 2013. The book, like Angelou's previous autobiographies, received mostly positive reviews. Fiona Sturges, who reviews the book in the British publication The Independent, and reviewer Stacy Russo of Library Journal both state that Angelou's readers would recognize many of the passages in Mom & Me & Mom from her earlier autobiographies. Bernardine Evaristo of the British publication The Observer, in one of the few negative reviews of Mom & Me & Mom, calls the book "a slight, anecdotal and badly edited book that rehashes stories from previous memoirs". Evaristo questions the veracity of Angelou's anecdotes, and states that some of them contradict earlier versions. Evaristo also believes that Mom & Me & Mom undermines Caged Bird, which she calls "a ground-breaking triumph".

According to reviewer Heid Erdrich, Mom & Me & Mom does not center on Angelou's childhood trauma, as described in Caged Bird, but "rather constructs a portrait of self via details of her relationship to the mother who abandoned her and with whom she reunited as a teenager". Erdrich states that Angelou's prose is "very simply written", and calls her tone "mostly light, even sweet, filled with affection for her younger self". Erdrich states that even though it could have been written for young women experiencing the same difficulties Angelou faced, the book does not preach, but "presents Angelou’s life path scattered with enormous obstacles endured and conquered through knowledge of self and a singular brand of mother love". Publishers Weekly agrees, stating, "The lessons and love presented here will speak to those trying to make their way in the world". Erdrich also states that Angelou's narrative of her "hard-won love for her extraordinary mother" is compelling, and that Angelou portrays Baxter "as extraordinarily self-aware, liberated from what others might think, and independent beyond any feminist of her era" and "the stuff of fiction but real and responsible in unexpected ways for the gift of her talented daughter".

Most critics feel that Baxter is presented well in Mom & Me & Mom. Candace Smith, who reviews the audio version of the book, states that Angelou celebrates the unconditional acceptance and support of her mother, who comes across "as a street-smart, caring woman who shaped the author's life and legacy by her words and example". Vanessa Bush of Booklist calls the book a "loving recollection of a complicated relationship" and a "remarkable and deeply revealing chronicle of love and healing". Russo states that the book is "a beautiful tribute to Baxter's independent, vibrant, and courageous spirit". Evaristo disagrees, and states that Baxter comes across as "less rounded, less interesting, more sanctified and less credible" than Angelou describes her elsewhere. Sturges calls the book "a profoundly moving tale of separation and reunion, and an ultimately optimistic portrait of the maternal bond". The most interesting part of the book, according to Sturges, is "Angelou's casual overturning of the idea of the mother who abandons her children as monstrous and inhumane". Sturges also says that Baxter is presented as unapologetic, charismatic, independent, and resilient, traits that "have seemingly been passed on to her daughter". Reviewer Valerie Sayers insists that the scenes that depict Angelou's "halting steps" towards her forgiveness and acceptance of her mother are among the best in the book. Sayers labels Mom & Me & Mom "an account of forgiveness", and like Angelou and Baxter, "just revealing enough, and pretty irresistible". Like her mother expected from her, Angelou expects her readers to move past their resentments and "whatever was unbearable". Sayers also calls both Baxter and Angelou "a Large Dramatic Presence", and says that Angelou matches her mother's spirit.

According to Sayers, the book contains Angelou's "trademark good humor and fierce optimism". Kirkus Reviews states that true to Angelou's style, her writing "cuts to the chase with compression and simplicity", and that it contains a "calypso smoothness, flurries and showers of musicality between the moments of wickedness". Kirkus also calls the book a "tightly strung, finely tuned memoir". According to Candace Smith in her review of the book's audio version, Angelou performs it "in her characteristic slow and thoughtful tones, and with careful enunciation". Although some of her anecdotes are painful to hear, Angelou is "unquestionably honest". Smith also states, "Although her voice doesn't show much outward emotion, her words are so powerful and the stories so fascinating that we remain riveted".

Most critics agreed that the book would be popular with readers familiar with Angelou's writings and to her new readers. Marjorie Kehe of The Christian Science Monitor, who calls it "a story of redemption" and "a tender read and a lovely tribute", anticipates that Angelou's readers would delight in it. Russo predicts that due to Angelou's popularity and "approachable writing", the book would have wide appeal for many readers.

== Works cited ==
- Angelou, Maya (2013). Mom & Me & Mom. New York: Random House. ISBN 1-4000-6611-5
- Gillespie, Marcia Ann, Rosa Johnson Butler, and Richard A. Long (2008). Maya Angelou: A Glorious Celebration. New York: Random House. ISBN 978-0-385-51108-7
- Lupton, Mary Jane (1998). Maya Angelou: A Critical Companion. Westport, Connecticut: Greenwood Press. ISBN 0-313-30325-8
