= Even the Stars Look Lonesome =

African-American writer and poet Maya Angelou's second book of essays

- The paperback version.
- Author: Maya Angelou
- Language: English
- Genre: Essays
- Publisher: Random House
- Publication date: 1997
- Publication place: United States
- Media type: Print
- Pages: 145
- ISBN: 0-553-37972-0
- Preceded by: Wouldn't Take Nothing for My Journey Now
- Followed by: Letter to My Daughter

Even the Stars Look Lonesome (1997) is African-American writer and poet Maya Angelou's second book of essays, published during the long period between her fifth and sixth autobiographies, All God's Children Need Traveling Shoes (1986) and A Song Flung Up to Heaven (2002). Stars, like her first book of essays, Wouldn't Take Nothing for My Journey Now (1993), has been called one of Angelou's "wisdom books". By the time it was published, Angelou was well-respected and popular as a writer and poet. She discusses a wide range of topics in the book's twenty short personal essays, including Africa, aging and the young's misconceptions of it, sex and sensuality, self-reflection, independence, and violence. Most of the essays are autobiographical and had previously appeared in other publications. One essay defends Angelou's support of Supreme Court justice Clarence Thomas, and another one centers on her friend Oprah Winfrey.

Stars was an immediate bestseller, prompting Random House to increase their first printing of 350,000 copies to 375,000, even before Angelou began her national book tour to promote it. Like her previous works, the book received generally positive reviews. An audio book, read by the author herself, was recorded in 2001.

== Background ==
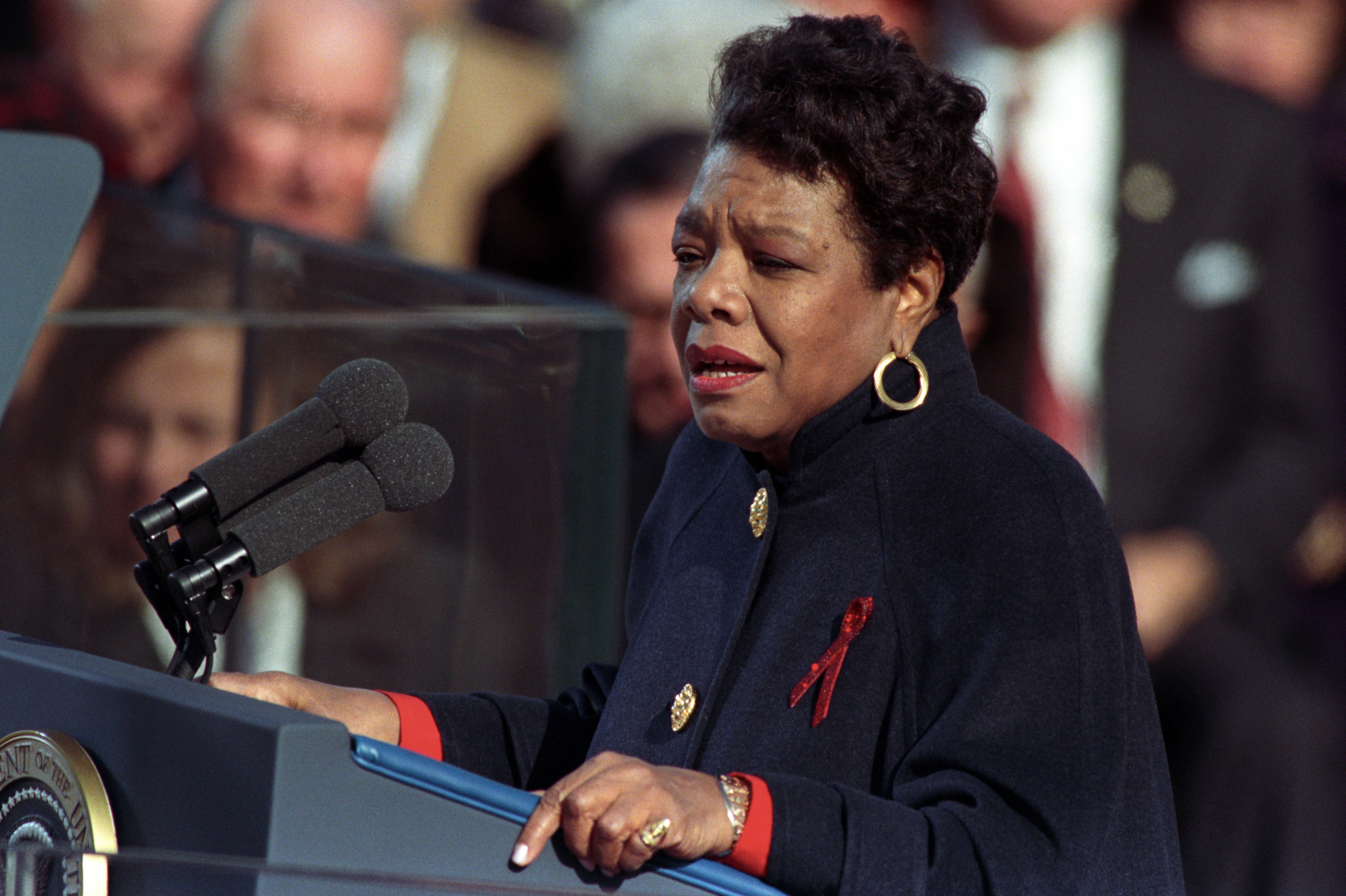
Maya Angelou, reciting her poem, "On the Pulse of Morning", at the 1993 inauguration of President Bill Clinton

Even the Stars Look Lonesome is Maya Angelou's second book of essays. Stars, together with her first book of essays Wouldn't Take Nothing for My Journey Now (1993), is one of the volumes writer Hilton Als called Angelou's "wisdom books" and "homilies strung together with autobiographical texts", published during the long period between her fifth and sixth autobiographies, All God's Children Need Traveling Shoes (1986) and A Song Flung Up to Heaven (2002). She had published several volumes of poetry, including Just Give Me a Cool Drink of Water 'fore I Diiie (1971), which was nominated for the Pulitzer Prize. She had recited her poem On the Pulse of Morning at the inauguration of President Bill Clinton in 1993, making her the first poet to make an inaugural recitation since Robert Frost at John F. Kennedy's inauguration in 1961. In 1997, when Stars was published, The Heart of a Woman (1981), Angelou's fourth installment of her series of autobiographies, was chosen as an Oprah's Book Club selection, helping it become a bestseller and increasing its total printing to over one million copies, 16 years after its publication. Also in 1997, Angelou was in the middle of accomplishing her long-standing goal: becoming the first African-American woman to direct a major motion picture, Down in the Delta.

By the time Stars was published, Angelou had become recognized and highly respected as a spokesperson for Blacks and women. She was, as scholar Joanne Braxton has stated, "without a doubt ... America's most visible black woman autobiographer". She had also become, as reviewer Richard Long stated, "a major autobiographical voice of the time". Angelou was one of the first African-American female writers to publicly discuss her personal life, and one of the first to use herself as a central character in her books. Writer Julian Mayfield, who called her first autobiography I Know Why the Caged Bird Sings "a work of art that eludes description", stated that Angelou's series set a precedent not only for other Black women writers, but for the genre of autobiography as a whole.

== Overview ==
Even the Stars Look Lonesome is a collection 20 short personal essays, most of which are autobiographical. All but one essay, "Those Who Really Know, Teach", previously appeared in other publications. The book is dedicated to "the children who will come to maturity in the twenty-first century" and lists more than 35 of them she knew, charging them to "make this a perfect world".

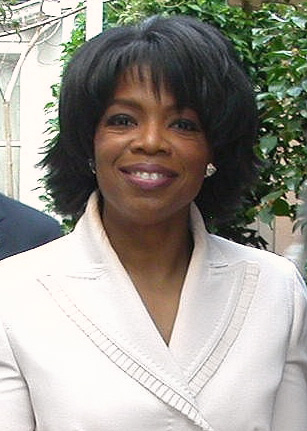
Angelou's friend Oprah Winfrey (shown here in 2004), the subject of one of the essays in Stars

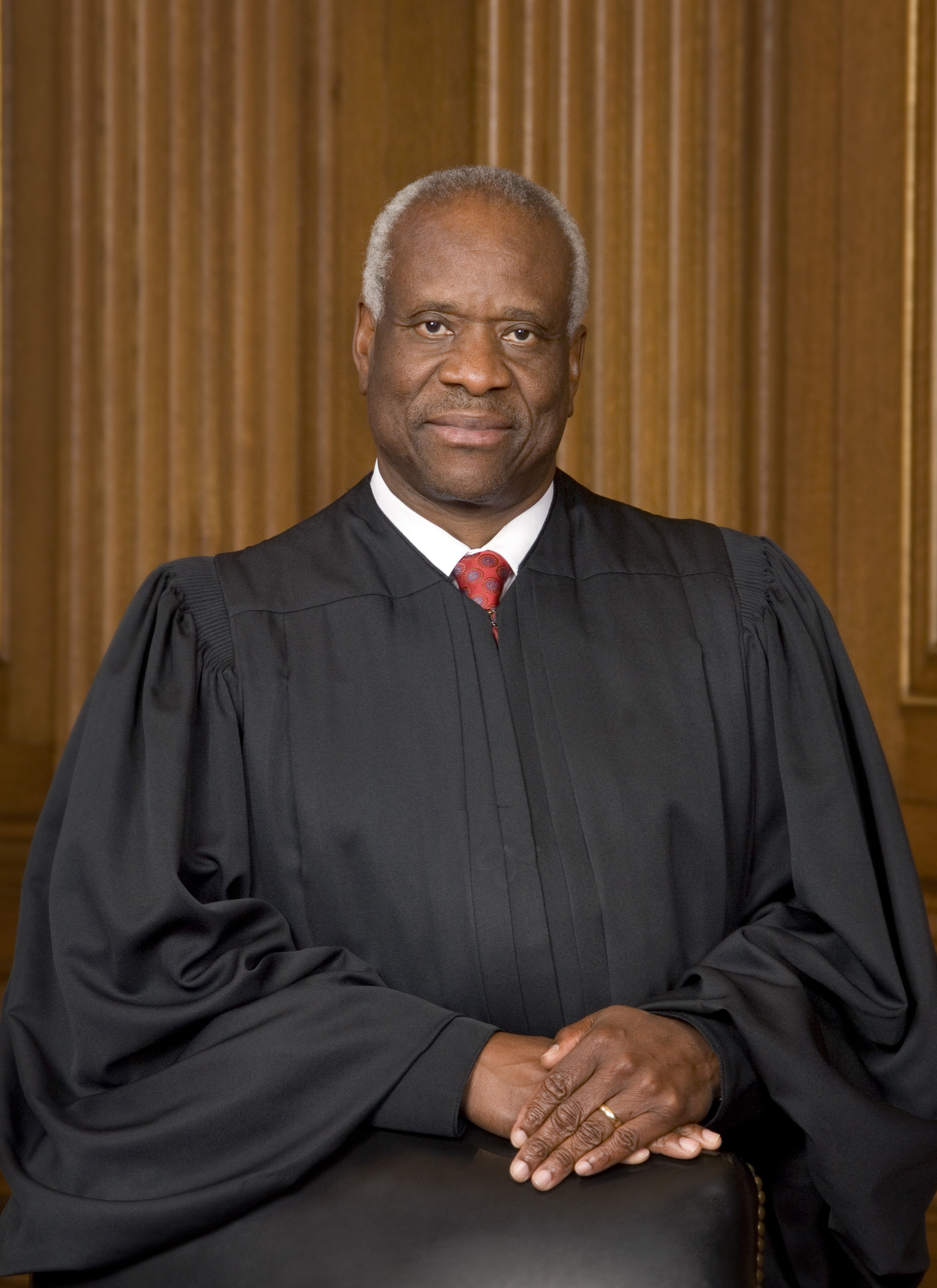
Angelou defends her controversial support of Clarence Thomas in Stars.

Angelou discusses a wide range of topics in Stars, including Africa, aging and the young's misconceptions of it, sex and sensuality, self-reflection, independence, and violence. She explores her early career as a nightclub performer. She writes about African art and "the importance of understanding both the historical truth of the African American experience and the art that truth inspired". She salutes Black women, calling them "precious jewels all", and profiles her friend Oprah Winfrey, who she compares to "the desperate traveler who teaches us the most profound lesson and affords us the most exquisite skills". (Note: Angelou dedicated Wouldn't Take Nothing for My Journey Now to Winfrey.) Angelou defends her controversial support of Clarence Thomas as a Supreme Court justice in one of her essays. In her final essay in the book, Angelou uses the story of the prodigal son to emphasize the value of solitude: "In the silence we listen to ourselves. Then we ask questions of ourselves. We describe ourselves to ourselves, and we may even hear the voice of God."

== Publication history and reviews ==
Even the Stars Look Lonesome was an immediate bestseller, prompting Random House to increase their first printing of 350,000 copies to 375,000, even before Angelou began her national book tour to promote it. An audio book, read by the author herself, was published in 2001.

Like Angelou's previous book of essays, Wouldn't Take Nothing for My Journey Now, this book received mostly positive reviews. Ann Burns of Library Journal recommended the book and called its first essay, about the end of Angelou's marriage to Paul du Feu, "a winner". Burns also stated: "Her take on aging is downright amusing; her tribute to sensuality, enlightening; and her salute to black women, a treasure". Megan Harlan of Entertainment Weekly noted Angelou's "ease with both highbrow and middlebrow culture", as evidenced in her discussion of poetry and of Winfrey, and praised how Angelou "balances lofty language with keenly self-aware wit", but found the first essay incomplete. The reviewers writing for Publishers Weekly found Stars "narrower in scope" than Journey, but thought that her racial pride in Stars stronger and more compelling. They also stated, "...All of her opinions are deeply rooted and most are conveyed with a combination of humility, personal intelligence and wit".

== Works cited ==
- Angelou, Maya (1997). Even the Stars Look Lonesome. New York: Random House. ISBN 0-553-37972-0
