= A Song Flung Up to Heaven =

Maya Angelou's sixth autobiography book

- The paperback version
- Author: Maya Angelou
- Language: English
- Genre: Autobiography
- Published: 2002 (Random House)
- Publication place: United States
- ISBN: 0-375-50747-7
- Preceded by: All God's Children Need Traveling Shoes
- Followed by: Mom & Me & Mom

A Song Flung Up to Heaven is the sixth book in author Maya Angelou's series of autobiographies. Set between 1965 and 1968, it begins where Angelou's previous book, All God's Children Need Traveling Shoes, ends, with Angelou's trip from Accra, Ghana, where she had lived for the past four years, back to the United States. Two "calamitous events" frame the beginning and end of the book—the assassinations of Malcolm X and Martin Luther King Jr. Angelou describes how she dealt with these events and the sweeping changes in both the country and in her personal life, and how she coped with her return home to the U.S. The book ends with Angelou at "the threshold of her literary career", writing the opening lines to her first autobiography, I Know Why the Caged Bird Sings.

As she had begun to do in Caged Bird, and continued throughout her series, Angelou upheld the long tradition of African-American autobiography. At the same time, she made a deliberate attempt to challenge the usual structure of the autobiography by critiquing, changing, and expanding the genre. Most reviewers agreed that the book was made up of a series of vignettes. By the time Song was written in 2002, sixteen years after her previous autobiography, Angelou had experienced great fame and recognition as an author and poet. She recited her poem "On the Pulse of Morning" at the inauguration of President Bill Clinton in 1993, becoming the first poet to make an inaugural recitation since Robert Frost at John F. Kennedy's in 1961. She had become recognized and highly respected as a spokesperson for Blacks and women. Angelou was, as scholar Joanne Braxton has stated, "without a doubt, ... America's most visible black woman autobiographer". She had also become, as reviewer Richard Long stated, "a major autobiographical voice of the time".

The title of Song was based upon the same poem, by African-American poet Paul Laurence Dunbar, the basis of her first autobiography. Like Angelou's other autobiographies, the book was greeted with both praise and disappointment, though reviews were generally positive. Reviewers praised Angelou for "the culmination of a unique autobiographical achievement", while others criticized her for coming across as "smug". The 2002 spoken word album by the same name, based on the book, received a Grammy Award for Best Spoken Word Album in 2003.

== Background ==
A Song Flung Up to Heaven (2002) is the sixth of Maya Angelou's series of autobiographies, and at the time of its publication it was considered the final installment. It was completed 16 years after the publication of her previous autobiography, All God's Children Need Traveling Shoes (1986), and over thirty years after the publication of her first, I Know Why the Caged Bird Sings. Angelou wrote two collections of essays in the interim, Wouldn't Take Nothing for My Journey Now (1993) and Even the Stars Look Lonesome (1997), which writer Hilton Als called her "wisdom books" and "homilies strung together with autobiographical texts". She also continued her poetry with several volumes, including a collection of her poems, The Complete Collected Poems of Maya Angelou (1994). In 1993, Angelou recited her poem On the Pulse of Morning at the inauguration of President Bill Clinton, becoming the first poet to make an inaugural recitation since Robert Frost at John F. Kennedy's inauguration in 1961. Her recitation resulted in more fame and recognition for her previous works, and broadened her appeal "across racial, economic, and educational boundaries".

By 2002, when Song was published, Angelou had become recognized and highly respected as a spokesperson for Blacks and women. She was, as scholar Joanne Braxton has stated, "without a doubt, ... America's most visible black woman autobiographer". She had also become "a major autobiographical voice of the time". Angelou was one of the first African-American female writers to publicly discuss her personal life, and one of the first to use herself as a central character in her books. Writer Julian Mayfield, who called her first autobiography "a work of art that eludes description", stated that Angelou's series set a precedent not only for other Black women writers, but for the genre of autobiography as a whole.

Als called Angelou one of the "pioneers of self-exposure", willing to focus honestly on the more negative aspects of her personality and choices. For example, while Angelou was composing her second autobiography, Gather Together in My Name, she was concerned about how her readers would react to her disclosure that she had been a prostitute. Her husband, Paul Du Feu, talked her into publishing the book by encouraging her to "tell the truth as a writer" and to "be honest about it". Song took 16 years to write because it was painful to relive the events she described, including the assassinations of Malcolm X and Martin Luther King Jr. She did not celebrate her birthday, April 4, for many years because it was also the anniversary of King's death, choosing instead to send his widow, Coretta Scott King, flowers. Although Song was considered the final installment in her series of autobiographies, Angelou continued writing about her life story through essays, and at the age of 85, published her seventh autobiography Mom & Me & Mom (2013), which focused on her relationship with her mother. The spoken word album based on Song and narrated by Angelou received a Grammy Award for Best Spoken Word Album in 2003.

=== Title ===
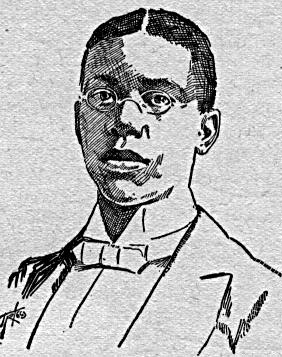
Paul Laurence Dunbar, whose poetry inspired both the titles of Angelou's first and sixth autobiographies in her series

Angelou returned to the same poem she based the title of Caged Bird on for the title of A Song Flung Up to Heaven, from the third stanza of the Paul Laurence Dunbar poem "Sympathy". Along with Shakespeare, Angelou has credited Dunbar with forming her "writing ambition". The caged bird, a symbol for the chained slave, is an image Angelou uses throughout all her writings.

I know why the caged bird sings, ah me,
When his wing is bruised and his bosom sore,
When he beats his bars and would be free;
It is not a carol of joy or glee,
But a prayer that he sends from his heart's deep core,
But a plea, that upward to Heaven he flings—
I know why the caged bird sings.

== Plot summary ==
A Song Flung Up to Heaven, which takes place between 1965 and 1968, picks up where Angelou's previous book, All God's Children Need Traveling Shoes, ends, with Angelou's airplane trip from Accra, Ghana, where she has spent the previous four years, back to the United States. Two "calamitous events" frame the beginning and end of the book—the assassinations of Malcolm X and Martin Luther King Jr. Her nineteen-year-old son Guy is attending college in Ghana, and she is leaving a controlling relationship—her "romantic other", whom she described as "a powerful West African man who had swept into my life with the urgency of a Southern hurricane". She had also been invited to return to the U.S. by Malcolm X, whom she had become friends with during his visit to Accra, to help her create the Organization of African Unity.

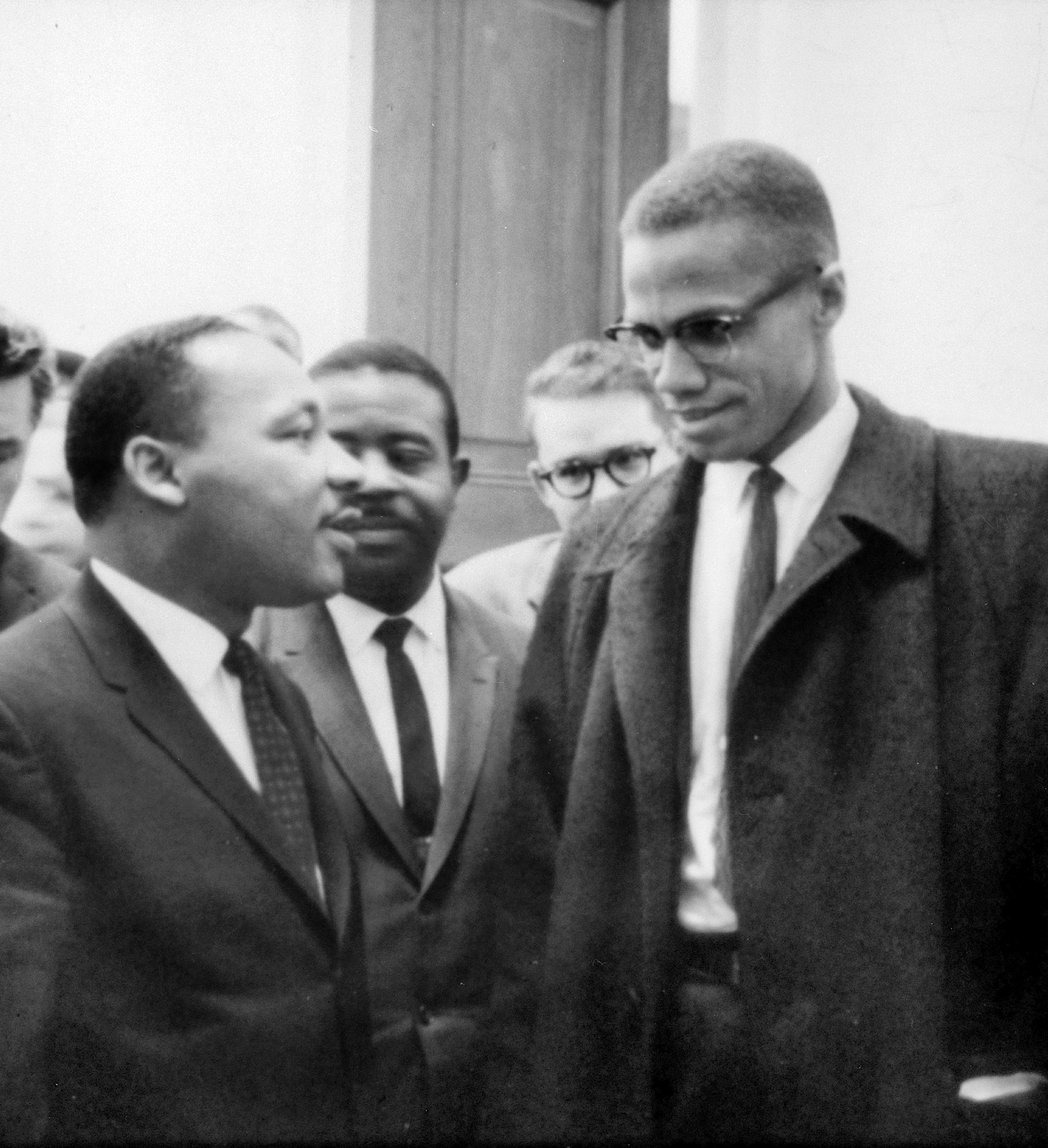
The assassinations of Martin Luther King Jr. and Malcolm X frame the events in A Song Flung Up to Heaven.

She postpones meeting with Malcolm X for a month and visits her mother and brother in San Francisco. Malcolm X is assassinated two days later. Devastated and grief-stricken, she moves to Hawaii to be near her brother and to resume her singing and performing career, which she had given up before leaving for Africa several years earlier. She realizes, after seeing Della Reese perform, she lacks the desire, commitment, and talent to be a singer. She instead returns to her writing career, but this time in Los Angeles instead of New York City as she had earlier in her life. To earn extra money, Angelou becomes a market researcher in Watts and gets to know the neighborhood and its people. She witnesses the 1965 Watts Riots, knowing that doing so could lead to her arrest, and she is genuinely disappointed that it does not.

At one point, Angelou's lover from Ghana, whom she calls "the African", arrives in Los Angeles to take her back to Accra. Angelou enlists the aid of her mother and brother; they come to her rescue once again by diverting the African first to Mexico and then back to Ghana. Guy, during a visit to his grandmother in San Francisco, gets into another car accident, similar to what happened before he began college in Ghana. (Note: Guy's first accident was described in two of Angelou's previous autobiographies, at the end of The Heart of a Woman, her fourth autobiography, and at the beginning of All God's Children Need Traveling Shoes, her fifth.) His maturity is striking to his mother, and she leaves him in the care of his grandmother.

Angelou returns to New York, where she dedicates herself to her writing and renews many of the friendships made there in the past. She also describes her personal and professional relationships with Ruby Dee, Ossie Davis, Beah Richards, and Frank Silvera. Martin Luther King Jr. asks her to travel around the country promoting the Southern Christian Leadership Conference. She agrees, but "postpones again", and he is assassinated on her 40th birthday. Again devastated, she isolates herself until she is invited to a dinner party also attended by her friend James Baldwin and cartoonist Jules Feiffer and his wife Judy. Judy Feiffer, inspired by Angelou's tales about her childhood, contacts editor Robert Loomis, who challenges Angelou to write her autobiography as literature. She accepts his challenge, and Song ends with Angelou at "the threshold of her literary career", writing the opening lines to her first autobiography, I Know Why the Caged Bird Sings:

"What are you looking at me for. I didn't come to stay".

== Style and genre ==
Starting with Caged Bird, Angelou made a deliberate attempt while writing all her autobiographies, including Song, to challenge the usual structure of the autobiography by critiquing, changing, and expanding the genre. Her use of fiction-writing techniques such as dialogue, characterization, and thematic development has often led reviewers to categorize her books as autobiographical fiction. Angelou stated in a 1989 interview that she was the only "serious" writer to choose the genre to express herself. As critic Susan Gilbert stated, Angelou was reporting not one person's story, but the collective's. Scholar Selwyn R. Cudjoe agreed, and viewed Angelou as representative of the convention in African-American autobiography as a public gesture that spoke for an entire group of people. Angelou's editor Robert Loomis was able to dare her to write Caged Bird by challenging her to write an autobiography that could be considered "high art", which she continued throughout her series.

Angelou's autobiographies conform to the genre's standard structure: they were written by a single author, they were chronological, and they contained elements of character, technique, and theme. In a 1983 interview with African-American literature critic Claudia Tate, Angelou called her books autobiographies. When speaking of her unique use of the genre, Angelou acknowledged that she has followed the slave narrative tradition of "speaking in the first-person singular talking about the first-person plural, always saying I meaning 'we'". Reviewer Elsie B. Washington agreed and stated that A Song Flung Up to Heaven "offers a glimpse into the life of a literary icon in the making" influenced by historical events and personalities such as Malcolm X, Martin Luther King Jr., and James Baldwin.

Angelou recognized that there were fictional aspects to all her books; she tended to "diverge from the conventional notion of autobiography as truth". Her approach paralleled the conventions of many African-American autobiographies written during the abolitionist period in the U.S., when truth was often censored for purposes of self-protection. Author Lyman B. Hagen has placed Angelou in the long tradition of African-American autobiography, but insisted that she has created a unique interpretation of the autobiographical form. In a 1998 interview with journalist George Plimpton, Angelou discussed her writing process and "the sometimes slippery notion of truth in nonfiction" and memoirs. When asked if she changed the truth to improve her story, she stated, "Sometimes I make a diameter from a composite of three or four people, because the essence in only one person is not sufficiently strong to be written about". Although Angelou has never admitted to changing the facts in her stories, she has used these facts to make an impact on the reader. As Hagen stated, "One can assume that 'the essence of the data' is present in Angelou's work". Hagen also stated that Angelou "fictionalizes, to enhance interest". Angelou's long-time editor, Robert Loomis, agreed, stating that she could rewrite any of her books by changing the order of her facts to make a different impact on the reader.

== Critical reception ==
Like Angelou's previous autobiographies, Song received mostly positive reviews, although as the Poetry Foundation has said: "Most critics have judged Angelou's subsequent autobiographies in light of her first, and I Know Why the Caged Bird Sings remains the most highly praised." Kim Hubbard of People, for example, found Song unsatisfying and "hastily assembled", but poetic like Caged Bird. Many reviewers appreciated what Kirkus Reviews called Angelou's "nice structural turn" of framing Song with two assassinations. Paula Friedman of The New York Times Book Review appreciated Angelou's "occasions of critical self-assessment and modesty" not present in many other autobiographies. Patricia Elam of The New Crisis agreed, stating that there is much to admire about both the book and about the "large life", full of tension, laughter, and love, it describes. Elam also called Song "a spirit-moving work that describes Angelou's journey through an authentic and artistic life".

This new book is like an inspired conversation—the kind you might have with a wise and comfortable stranger seated next to you on a long bus ride. It doesn't wrench or disturb the way her first book did, but instead shares with subtlety and sometimes intimacy, experiences from a well-traveled life. Rather than struggling to recall the details of a distant past, Angelou sketches the scenes with broad familiarity, as if using a memory brush, and the reader is transported just the same.

— Patricia Elam, The New Crisis (2002)

Reviewer Margaret Busby, who saw this book "not so much an ending as a beginning", called Song "the culmination of a unique autobiographical achievement, a glorious celebration of indomitable spirit". Like other reviewers, Busby considered Song a series of "beautifully crafted vignettes" and found the book concise and readable. Scholar John McWhorter did not look at Angelou's use of vignettes as positively, and stated that all of her books were short, divided into "ever shorter" chapters as her series progressed, and "sometimes seem written for children rather than adults". McWhorter recognized, however, that Angelou's precise prose and "striking and even jarring simplicity" was due to Angelou's purposes of depicting African-American culture in a positive way. Busby also recognized Angelou's ability to find inspirational lessons from adversity, both nationally and personally, although the in this book emphasized the personal, especially her dilemmas as a mother and as a lover.

Amy Strong of The Library Journal, perhaps because Angelou's life during the time the book took place was full of more personal loss than conflict and struggle, considered Song less profound and intense than the previous books in Angelou's series. She predicted that Song′s direct and plainspoken style would be popular. Publishers Weekly, in its review, agreed with Strong and saw "a certain resignation" in Song, instead of "the contentiousness" in Angelou's other autobiographies. The reviewer said that those who lived through the era Angelou described would appreciate her assessment, and that Song was "a story of tragedy and triumph, well stated and clearly stamped by her own unique blend of Afro-Americanism". The assassinations in Song provided the book with depth as Angelou described the events of her life, that would be "mere meanderings" if described by a less skilled writer. The reviewer was able to see Angelou's "gracious spirit" and found the book "satisfying", although he considered it a "sometimes flat account" that lacked "the spiritual tone of Angelou's essays, the openness of her poetry and the drama of her other autobiographies".

Both McWhorter and scholar Hilton Als found Angelou's writing throughout her series self-important. Although McWhorter has admitted to being charmed by Angelou's sense of authority she has inserted into her works, which he calls her "black-mother wit", he considered Angelou's autobiographies after Caged Bird "smug", and has stated that she "implicitly dares the reader to question her private line to God and Truth". Als agreed, stating what made Song different from her preceding volumes is her "ever-increasing unreliability". Als stated that Angelou, in her six autobiographies, "has given us ... the self-aggrandizing, homespun, and sometimes oddly prudish story of a black woman who, when faced with the trials of life, simply makes do". Als believed that Angelou's essays, written in the 1990s, were a better culmination of her work as an autobiographer.

== Works cited ==
- Angelou, Maya (2002). A Song Flung Up to Heaven. New York: Random House. ISBN 0-553-38203-9.
- Hagen, Lyman B. (1997). Heart of a Woman, Mind of a Writer, and Soul of a Poet: A Critical Analysis of the Writings of Maya Angelou. Lanham, Maryland: University Press of America. ISBN 0-7618-0621-0.
- Lupton, Mary Jane (1998). Maya Angelou: A Critical Companion. Westport, Connecticut: Greenwood Press. ISBN 0-313-30325-8.
- Tate, Claudia (1999). "Maya Angelou: An Interview". In Braxton, Joanne M. (ed.). Maya Angelou's I Know Why the Caged Bird Sings: A Casebook. New York: Oxford Press. ISBN 0-19-511606-2.
