= Letter to My Daughter =

Book by Maya Angelou

- Front cover
- Author: Maya Angelou
- Language: English
- Genre: Essays
- Publisher: Random House
- Publication date: 2009
- Publication place: United States
- Media type: Print
- Pages: 166
- ISBN: 978-0-8129-8003-5
- Preceded by: Even the Stars Look Lonesome

Letter to My Daughter (2009) is the third book of essays by African-American writer and poet Maya Angelou. By the time it was published, Angelou had written two other books of essays, several volumes of poetry, and six autobiographies. She was recognized and highly respected as a spokesperson for black people and women, and had become "a major autobiographical voice of the time". Angelou had no daughters herself, but was inspired to write Letter as she was going through 20 years of notes and essay ideas, some of which were written for her friend Oprah Winfrey. Angelou wrote the book for the thousands of women who saw her as a mother figure, and to share the wisdom gained throughout her long life.

Letter consists of 28 short essays, which includes a few poems and a commencement address, and is dedicated to "the daughter she never had". Reviews of the book were generally positive; most reviewers recognized that the book was full of Angelou's wisdom and that it read like words of advice from a beloved grandmother or aunt. One reviewer found the book's essays both homespun and "hokey".

== Background ==
Letter to My Daughter is Maya Angelou's third book of essays. (Note: Writer Hilton Als called Angelou's first two books of essays, Wouldn't Take Nothing for My Journey Now (1993) and Even the Stars Look Lonesome (1997), her "wisdom books" and "homilies strung together with autobiographical texts".) She had published several volumes of poetry, including Just Give Me a Cool Drink of Water 'fore I Diiie (1971), which was nominated for the Pulitzer Prize. She had recited her poem, "On the Pulse of Morning", at the inauguration of President Bill Clinton in 1993, making her the first poet to make an inaugural recitation since Robert Frost at John F. Kennedy's inauguration in 1961. In 2009, when Letter was published, Angelou had published six out of her seven installments of her series of autobiographies. Her sixth autobiography, A Song Flung Up to Heaven (2002), was considered her final autobiography until she published her seventh autobiography, Mom & Me & Mom, in 2013, at the age of 85.

I gave birth to one child, a son, but I have thousands of daughters. You are Black and White, Jewish and Muslim, Asian, Spanish-speaking, Native American and Aleut. You are fat and thin and pretty and plain, gay and straight, educated and unlettered, and I am speaking to you.

— Angelou in the preface of Letter to My Daughter

By the time Letter was published, Angelou had become recognized and highly respected as a spokesperson for Blacks and women. She was, as scholar Joanne Braxton has stated, "without a doubt ... America's most visible black woman autobiographer". She had also become, as reviewer Richard Long stated, "a major autobiographical voice of the time". Angelou was one of the first African-American female writers to publicly discuss her personal life, and one of the first to use herself as a central character in her books. Writer Julian Mayfield, who called her first autobiography, I Know Why the Caged Bird Sings, "a work of art that eludes description", stated that Angelou's series set a precedent not only for other Black women writers, but for the genre of autobiography as a whole.

== Overview ==
Angelou came up with Letter to My Daughter, which became a New York Times bestseller, while going through old boxes of notes and papers full of concepts for future books and poems, which she called "WIP" ("Works in Progress"). She found twenty years worth of notes written to her friend Oprah Winfrey, and realized that she should put the essays they inspired into a book so that others could read them. Although she had no daughters, and gave birth to a son (Guy Johnson), which she called "the best thing that ever happened to me in my life", many women in Angelou's career looked to her as a mother figure. She wrote Letters to speak to those women and to share with them the wisdom she has gained throughout her long life. According to writer Gary Younge of The Guardian, most of the essays "end with the kind of wisdom that, depending on your taste, qualifies as either homespun or hokey". For example, she uses what has been called her most famous statement, when speaking of Cuban artist Celia Cruz: "We are more alike than unalike". (Note: The line first appears in Angelou's poem "Human Family", from her fifth collection of poetry I Shall Not Be Moved (1990), and again in her 1993 book of essays, Wouldn't Take Nothing for My Journey Now.) Although Angelou discounts the idea when he brings it up to her, Younge thinks Letter reads like an extended farewell; in her 500-word introduction she mentions death twice.

Never whine. Whining lets a brute know that a victim is in the neighborhood.

— Angelou in the preface of Letter to My Daughter

Letter consists of 28 "short epistles", which includes a few poems and a commencement address, and is dedicated to "the daughter she never had". Angelou thanks several women on her dedication page, which is divided into three groups. The first group of five women, which includes her grandmother Annie Henderson and her mother Vivian Baxter, she calls "...some women who mothered me through dark and bright days". The second group has only one name, Dr. Dorothy Height, "...one woman who allows me to be a daughter to her, even today". The final group is the largest, made up of 12 women, whom she calls "women not born to me but who allow me to mother them". The group includes Winfrey, Gayle King, her niece Rosa Johnson Butler, her assistant Lydia Stuckey, and gospel singer Valerie Simpson.

== Reviews ==
In his review of Letter to My Daughter, Younge states, "At moments in the book she sounds like an elderly relative, distraught at the wayward manners of the young," but also says that Angelou seems to have "outlived the need for social convention". Kirkus Reviews finds "old fashioned wisdom" in the book, and calls it "a slim volume packed with nourishing nuggets of wisdom". Reviewer Karen Algeo Krizman says that "Angelou delivers with her signature passion and fire" and that although the essays are "easy to take in during brief moments of quiet", they have a powerful message. Laura L. Hutchison of The Fredicksburg Free Lance-Star states that Letter is "written in Angelou's beautiful, poetic style" and called the essays "advice from a beloved aunt or grandmother, whose wisdom you know was earned". Hutchinson also stated that the book would gain Angelou new readers, and that her current audience would read and reread it. Psychologists Eranda Jayawickreme and Marie J. C. Forgearda called the essays in Letter to My Daughter "illuminating" and used it as a non-scientific, interdisciplinary text to teach positive psychology.

Victoria Brownworth of The Baltimore Sun, who compares Angelou to populist poets such as Walt Whitman, notes that while reading Letter, "one cannot help but be struck by how much Angelou has overcome and how far she has come". Brownworth states that despite Angelou's harrowing and complex experiences, and the barriers she had to overcome, Angelou was "filled with life and generosity and a deep yearning to pass her story on to other young women". Brownworth calls Angelou's prose "colloquial and from the heart". She also compares Angelou's "fluid narrative" to oral history, and states, "The kernels of insight and, yes, wisdom in this small volume will stay with the reader for a long time".
