= Wouldn't Take Nothing for My Journey Now =

African-American writer and poet Maya Angelou's first book of essays

- The paperback version
- Author: Maya Angelou
- Language: English
- Genre: Essays
- Published: 1993 (Random House)
- Publication place: United States
- Media type: Print
- Pages: 139
- ISBN: 0-553-56907-4
- Followed by: Even the Stars Look Lonesome

Wouldn't Take Nothing for My Journey Now, published in 1993, is African-American writer and poet Maya Angelou's first book of essays. It was published shortly after she recited her poem "On the Pulse of Morning" at President Bill Clinton's 1993 inauguration. Journey consists of a series of short essays, often autobiographical, along with two poems, and has been called one of Angelou's "wisdom books". It is titled after a lyric in the African American spiritual, "On My Journey Now." At the time of its publication, Angelou was already well respected and popular as a writer and poet. Like her previous works, Journey received generally positive reviews.

== Background ==
Wouldn't Take Nothing for My Journey Now (1993) is Maya Angelou's first book of essays, published shortly after she recited her poem "On the Pulse of Morning" at the inauguration of US President Bill Clinton, making her the first poet to make an inaugural recitation since Robert Frost at John F. Kennedy's 1961 inauguration. Her recitation resulted in more recognition for her previous works and broadened her appeal "across racial, economic, and educational boundaries". Journey is, together with the 1997 book Even the Stars Look Lonesome, one of the volumes that writer Hilton Als called Angelou's "wisdom book, comprising "homilies strung together with autobiographical texts".

Journey was published during the period between her fifth and sixth autobiographies, All God's Children Need Traveling Shoes (1986) and A Song Flung Up to Heaven (2002). Angelou's second book of essays, Even the Stars Look Lonesome, was published in 1997. She had earlier published several volumes of poetry, including the Pulitzer Prize-nominated Just Give Me a Cool Drink of Water 'fore I Diiie (1971). Angelou's first personal essays were published in Essence in late 1992. The positive response from her readers and the encouragement of her friend Oprah Winfrey inspired her to write Journey. She later admitted that the public's response was "puzzling" to her. She also stated that she attempted to be "accessible" to her readers in the book. Journey appeared on The New York Times bestseller list and had an initial printing of 300,000 copies. The Los Angeles Times, in a report about the 1993 financial struggles of Angelou's publisher, Random House, speculated that the success of Journey partly compensated for the publisher's other losses.

By 1993, when Journey was published, Angelou had become recognized and highly respected as a spokesperson for Blacks and women. She was, as scholar Joanne Braxton stated, "without a doubt ... America's most visible black woman autobiographer". She had also become, as reviewer Richard Long stated, "a major autobiographical voice of the time". Angelou was one of the first African-American female writers to publicly discuss her personal life, and one of the first to use herself as a central character in her books. Writer Julian Mayfield, who called her first autobiography I Know Why the Caged Bird Sings "a work of art that eludes description", stated that Angelou's series set a precedent not only for other Black women writers, but for the genre of autobiography as a whole.

The book's title, comes from a lyric in the African American spiritual, "On My Journey Now," which Angelou called "a great song." The lyric also appears in the Civil Rights Anthem, "Keep Your Eyes on the Prize."

== Overview ==
"Human beings are more alike than unalike"

— (Journey, p. 11) – One of Angelou's most famous statements

Wouldn't Take Nothing for My Journey Now consists of 24 "journalistic homilies" or "meditations", many of which are autobiographical, that range in number from 63 to a few hundred words. Siona Carpenter of Religion News Service considered Journey as a part of the increase in popularity of motivational and inspirational books written by and for African Americans during the mid-1990s. The book's topics include fashion, entertainment, sensuality, pregnancy, racism, and death. Her character sketches are similar to the descriptions of people, including those of herself, that appear throughout her autobiographies. The book contains two poems, "Mrs. V.B." about her mother Vivian Baxter, who was one of the first Black females to join the merchant marine, and an untitled poem about the similarities between all people, despite their racial and cultural differences.

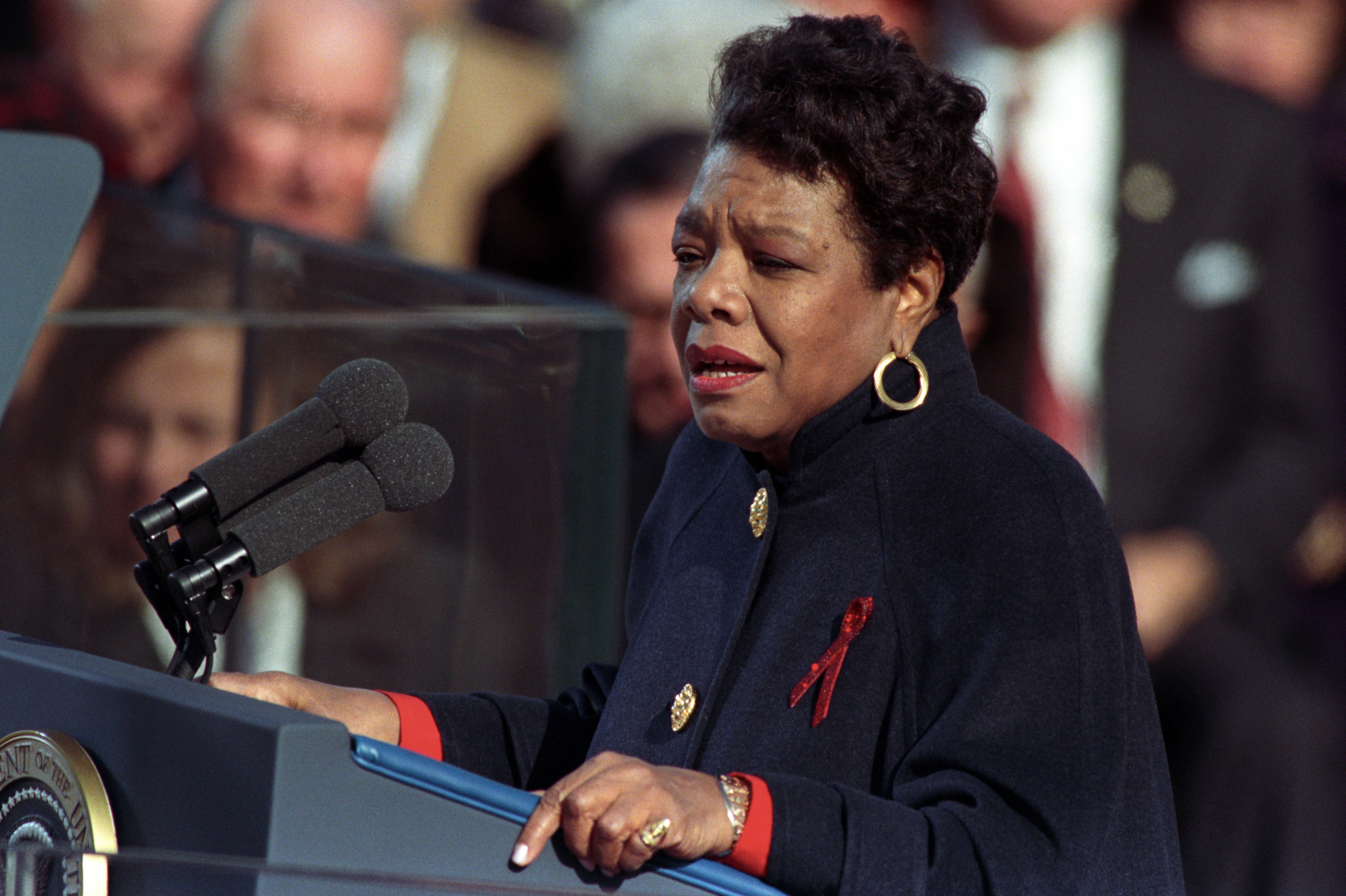
Angelou reciting her poem "On the Pulse of Morning" at President Bill Clinton's inauguration in 1993

== Reviews ==
As with Angelou's previous works, reviews of Wouldn't Take Nothing for My Journey Now were generally positive. Mary Jane Lupton compared the essays in Journey to traditional Asian poetry and to the writings of Confucius. Many reviewers saw similarities between the essays in the book and Angelou's autobiographical writing. Anne Patterson-Rabon, who was emotionally impacted by Angelou's essays, praised Angelou for her effective use of essays to tell her story and to illustrate her points. Lupton compared many of the events and character sketches in this book to descriptions in Angelou's autobiographies. She compared two essays about Angelou's grandmother to the descriptions in Angelou's first autobiography I Know Why the Caged Bird Sings, and the essay "Extending the Boundaries" to her quarrel with her husband's mistress in The Heart of a Woman. Marigold A. Clark of the Bowling Green, Kentucky Daily News called Journey "an autobiography like none other". She praised Angelou for using "her experiences as examples".

Genevieve Stuttaford of Publishers Weekly called the essays in Journey "quietly inspirational pieces". Anne Whitehouse of The New York Times wrote that the book would "appeal to readers in search of clear messages with easily digested meanings". Patterson-Rabon stated that the book "sings" like the song from which it got its title. Journey made an emotional impact on Clark, who stated: "The reader can almost hear her voice through the written words." Paul D. Colford of the Los Angeles Times said that the essays in the book "pass as easily as an evening breeze".

== Works cited ==
- Lupton, Mary Jane (1998). Maya Angelou: A Critical Companion. Westport, Connecticut: Greenwood Press. ISBN 0-313-30325-8
