= Sympathy (poem) =

1899 poem by Paul Laurence Dunbar

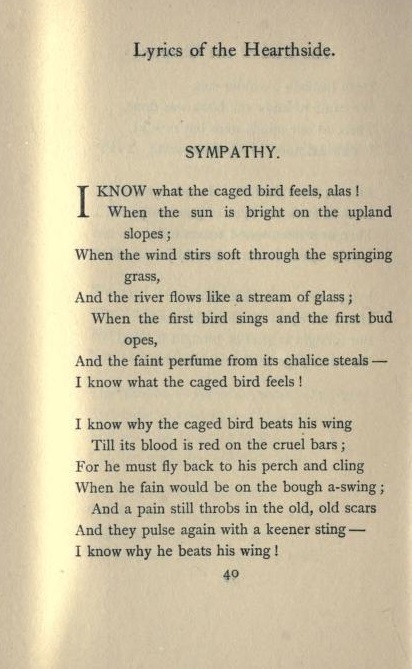
"Sympathy" as first published in Lyrics of the Hearthside, 1899

"Sympathy" is an 1899 poem written by Paul Laurence Dunbar. Dunbar, one of the most prominent African-American writers of his time, wrote the poem while working in unpleasant conditions at the Library of Congress. The poem is often considered to be about the struggle of African-Americans. Maya Angelou titled her autobiography I Know Why the Caged Bird Sings from a line in the poem and referenced its themes throughout her autobiographies.

== Background ==
Paul Laurence Dunbar (1872–1906) was an American poet. Born to freed slaves, he became one of the most prominent African-American poets of his time in the 1890s. Dunbar, who was twenty-seven when he wrote "Sympathy", had already published several poetry collections which had sold well. He was hired to work as an attendant at the Library of Congress on September 30, 1897, but the experience was unpleasant and strained his declining health. He wrote "Sympathy" at least in part because he was feeling "like he was trapped in a cage" while working there. Alice Dunbar Nelson, Dunbar's wife, later wrote in a 1914 article that:

The iron grating of the book stacks in the Library of Congress suggested to him the bars of the bird’s cage. June and July days are hot. All out of doors called and the trees of the shaded streets of Washington were tantalizingly suggestive of his beloved streams and fields. The torrid sun poured its rays down into the courtyard of the library and heated the iron grilling of the book stacks until they were like prison bars in more senses than one. The dry dust of the dry books (ironic incongruity!–a poet shut up with medical works), rasped sharply in his hot throat, and he understood how the bird felt when it beats its wings against its cage.

— Alice Dunbar Nelson, A.M.E. Church Review (1914)

"Sympathy" was first published in 1899 in Dunbar's poetry collection Lyrics of the Hearthside. He had previously published a poem also titled "Sympathy" in 1893.

== Text ==
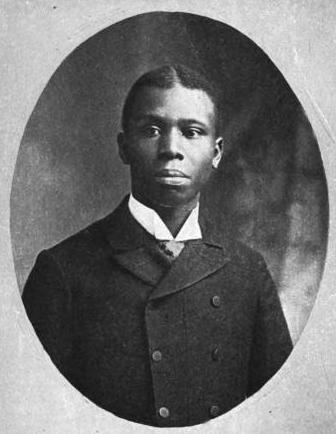
Dunbar in 1897

I know what the caged bird feels, alas!
When the sun is bright on the upland slopes;
When the wind stirs soft through the springing grass,
And the river flows like a stream of glass;
When the first bird sings and the first bud opes,
And the faint perfume from its chalice steals –
I know what the caged bird feels!

I know why the caged bird beats his wing
Till its blood is red on the cruel bars;
For he must fly back to his perch and cling
When he fain would be on the bough a-swing;
And a pain still throbs in the old, old scars
And they pulse again with a keener sting –
I know why he beats his wing!

I know why the caged bird sings, ah me,
When his wing is bruised and his bosom sore, –
When he beats his bars and he would be free;
It is not a carol of joy or glee,
But a prayer that he sends from his heart's deep core,
But a plea, that upward to Heaven he flings –
I know why the caged bird sings!

== Reception ==
The literary critic Joanne M. Braxton considers "Sympathy" to represent Dunbar as a "mature" poet who is finding his own voice as a poet and distancing himself from "the imitation of European models". The poet Carol Rumens described the poem as "an almost unbearably painful lyric." She concludes her analysis by saying that "Dunbar's parents had known the agony of being slaves; Dunbar understands that there are other kinds of cages for their children." In The Cambridge History of African American Literature, the scholar Keith Leonard described "Sympathy" as following Standard English norms and felt that its "celebration of nature" was "common to Romantic poets" but that it also "betrays Dunbar's social anxieties."

"Sympathy" is about "the frustration of perceiving a better life that one cannot obtain", according to the scholar Alan Burns. He notes that the imagery of a bird in a cage references enslaved black Americans. The scholar Christine A. Wooley feels that Dunbar personally identified with the bird, but notes that the final stanza "subtly shifts the reader away from the bird's experience toward what the experience produces: the song."

The poem and "We Wear The Mask" are two of Dunbar's most widely anthologized poems, and "Sympathy" has been cited as one of his more popular works. Although Dunbar was only twenty seven when he wrote the poem, he died six years later.

== Structure ==
The poem itself is divided into three stanzas. The first stanza revolved around the "caged bird" longing for freedom as spring and freedom exist around it. In stanza two, the bird is described as fighting to be free and escape the cage. Finally, the third stanza is about, as Burns notes, "the nature of the bird's song", as a "prayer for freedom." Every stanza begins and ends with a similar refrain. "Sympathy" uses an abaabcc rhyming scheme.

== Legacy ==
Maya Angelou titled her first autobiography, I Know Why the Caged Bird Sings (1969), from a line in "Sympathy", at the suggestion of jazz musician and activist Abbey Lincoln. Angelou said that Dunbar's works had inspired her "writing ambition." She returns to his symbol of a caged bird as a chained slave in some of her writing, referencing the metaphor throughout all of her autobiographies. Angelou wrote the poem "Caged Bird" in 1983 as a "sequel" to "Sympathy" and the title of her sixth autobiography, A Song Flung Up to Heaven, was also inspired by the poem.

Scholars have also drawn parallels between Dunbar's poem and a scene in Ralph Ellison's Invisible Man (1952).
