= All God's Children Need Traveling Shoes =

1986 memoir by Maya Angelou

- Cover from the first edition of All God's Children Need Traveling Shoes
- Author: Maya Angelou
- Language: English
- Genre: Autobiography
- Published: 1986 (Random House)
- Publication place: United States
- Pages: 209
- ISBN: 0-394-52143-9
- Preceded by: The Heart of a Woman
- Followed by: A Song Flung Up to Heaven

All God's Children Need Traveling Shoes, published in 1986, is the fifth book in Maya Angelou's seven-volume autobiography series. Set between 1962 and 1965, the book begins when Angelou is 33 years old, and recounts the years she lived in Accra, Ghana. The book, deriving its title from a Negro spiritual, begins where Angelou's previous memoir, The Heart of a Woman, ends—with the traumatic car accident involving her son Guy—and closes with Angelou returning to America.

As she had started to do in her first autobiography, I Know Why the Caged Bird Sings, and continued throughout her series, Angelou upholds the long tradition of African-American autobiography. At the same time she makes a deliberate attempt to challenge the usual structure of the autobiography by critiquing, changing, and expanding the genre. Angelou had matured as a writer by the time she wrote Traveling Shoes, to the point that she was able to play with the form and structure of the work. As in her previous books, it consists of a series of anecdotes connected by theme. She depicts her struggle with being the mother of a grown son, and with her place in her new home.

Angelou examines many of the same subjects and themes that her previous autobiographies covered. Although motherhood is an important theme in this book, it does not overwhelm the text as it does in some of her other works. At the end of the book, she ties up the mother/son plot when she leaves her son in Ghana and returns to America. According to scholar Mary Jane Lupton, "Angelou's exploration of her African and African-American identities" is an important theme in Traveling Shoes. By the end of the book, Angelou comes to term with what scholar Dolly McPherson calls her "double-consciousness", the parallels and connections between the African and American parts of her history, character, and identity. Racism continues to be an important theme in this book. Journey and a sense of home is another important theme in this book; Angelou upholds the African-American tradition of the slave narrative and of her own series of autobiographies. This time she focuses on "trying to get home", or on becoming assimilated in African culture, a goal she finds unattainable.

All God's Children Need Traveling Shoes received a mixed reception from critics, but most of their reviews were positive.

== Background ==
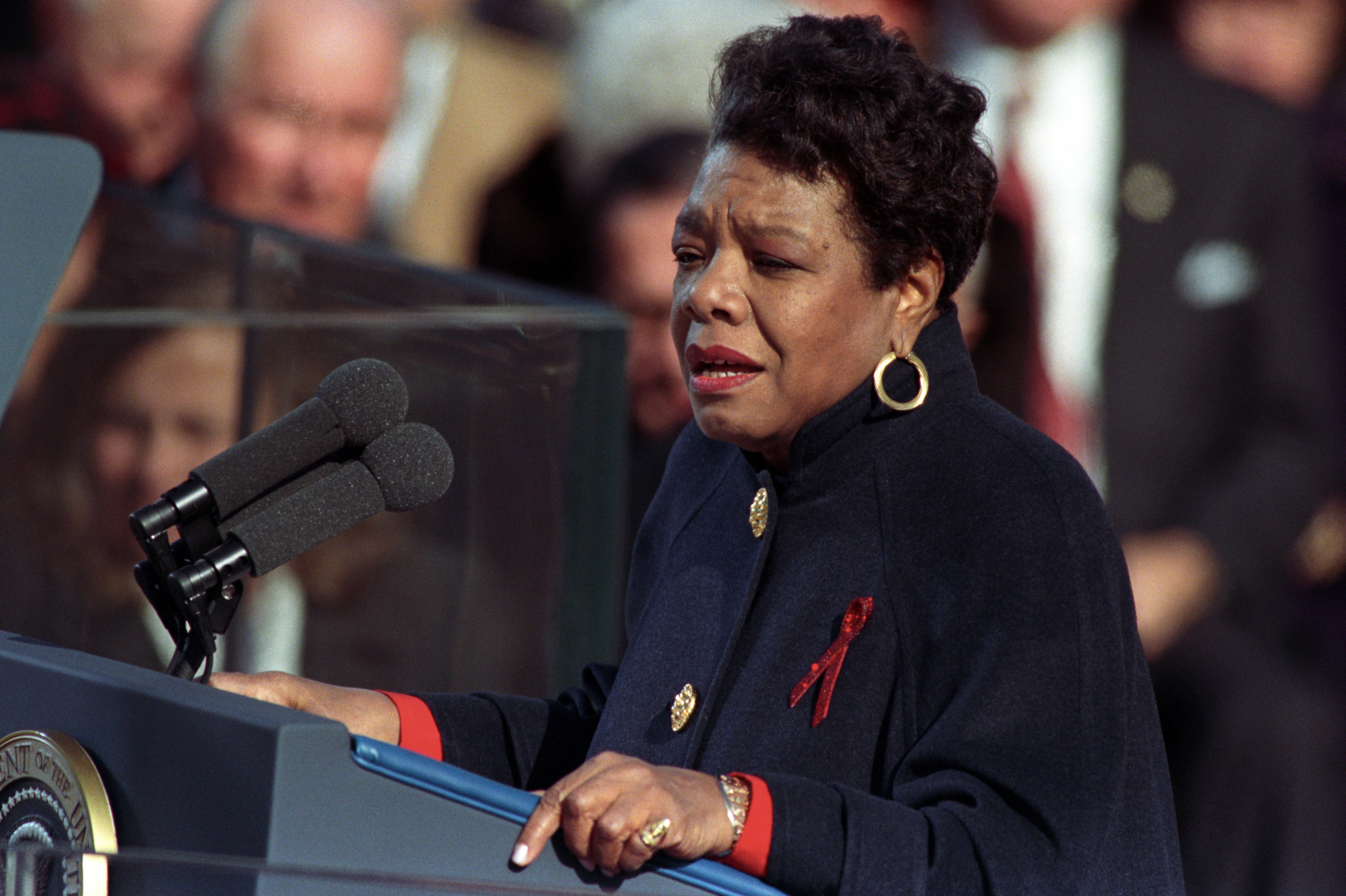
Angelou reciting her poem "On the Pulse of Morning" at President Bill Clinton's inauguration in 1993

All God's Children Need Traveling Shoes, published in 1986, is the fifth installment of Maya Angelou's series of seven autobiographies. The success of Angelou's previous autobiographies and the publication of four volumes of poetry had brought Angelou a considerable amount of fame by 1986. And Still I Rise (1978), her third volume of poetry, reinforced Angelou's success as a writer. Her first volume of poetry, Just Give Me a Cool Drink of Water 'fore I Diiie (1971), was nominated for a Pulitzer Prize. (Note: It was Angelou's early practice to alternate a prose volume with a poetry volume.)

As writer Hilton Als states, Angelou was one of the first African-American female writers to publicly discuss her personal life, and one of the first to use herself as a central character in her books, something she continues in Traveling Shoes. Writer Julian Mayfield, who calls her first autobiography, I Know Why the Caged Bird Sings, "a work of art that eludes description", says that Angelou's work sets a precedent not only for other Black women writers, but for the genre of autobiography as a whole.

Als called Angelou one of the "pioneers of self-exposure", willing to focus honestly on the more negative aspects of her personality and choices. For example, while Angelou was composing her second autobiography, Gather Together in My Name, she was concerned about how her readers would react to her disclosure that she had been a prostitute. Her husband Paul Du Feu talked her into publishing the book by encouraging her to "tell the truth as a writer" and "be honest about it". Through the writing of her life stories, Angelou has become recognized and highly respected as a spokesperson for Blacks and women. It made her, as scholar Joanne Braxton has stated, "without a doubt, ... America's most visible black woman autobiographer".

According to McPherson, Traveling Shoes is "a mixture of Maya Angelou's personal recollection and a historical document of the time in which it is set", the early 1960s. This was the first time that many Black Americans, due to the independence of Ghana and other African states, as well as the emergence of African leaders such as Kwame Nkrumah, viewed Africa in a positive way. Ghana was "the center of an African cultural renaissance" and of Pan-Africanism during this time.

== Title ==
I got shoes, you got shoes
All o' God's chillun got shoes
When I get to heab'n I'm goin' to put on my shoes
I'm goin' to walk all ovah God's Heab'n
Heab'n, Heab'n
Ev'rybody talkin' 'bout heab'n ain't goin' dere
Heab'n, Heab'n
I'm goin' to walk all ovah God's Heab'n

According to Angelou, the title of Traveling Shoes comes from a spiritual. African-American scholar Lyman B. Hagen reports that the title comes from the spiritual "All God's Chillun Got Wings", Angelou's "clever reference" to her ongoing search for a home while being aware of "our ultimate home". The title demonstrates Angelou's love of African-American spirituals and deep sense of religion that appears in all of her works. Scholar Annie Gagiano agrees that Angelou draws upon African-American musical heritage in her title of the book; as she puts it, "the spiritual promises enslaved people free exploration of the celestial territory that will compensate for the restrictions suffered in life". Gagiano also says that the title is a subtle criticism of the American capitalist and racist society that makes leaving it in order to experience other cultures desirable and necessary. Critic Mary Jane Lupton finds the appearance of the word "traveling" purposeful, since it emphasizes the journey theme, one of Angelou's most important themes of the book. Like Angelou's previous volumes in her series, the title contributes to its plot and thematic impact.

British singer-songwriter Tanita Tikaram uses the title of Traveling Shoes in her song "Twist in My Sobriety" (1988) in its opening line: "All God's children need traveling shoes". Tikaram said during an interview on Polish television that she used the line because it sounded poetic and spiritual to her and because it evoked feelings of isolation. She later described "Twist in My Sobriety" as a "kind of road song" with a description of a landscape, and called the imagery in the song "very bookish". The song also fit with the imagery of the album in which it appears, Ancient Heart, which is full of Tikaram's love of literature.

== Plot summary ==
All God's Children Need Traveling Shoes takes place during Ghana in the 1960s, "a historical epoch in which independence from British colonial rule was still a new phenomenon". It begins as Angelou's previous book, The Heart of a Woman, ends: with her depiction of a serious automobile accident involving her son Guy. After spending two years in Cairo, they come to Accra to enroll Guy in the University of Ghana, and the accident occurs three days after they arrive. Following Guy's long convalescence, they remain in Ghana, Angelou for four years, from 1962 to 1965. Angelou describes Guy's recovery, including her deep depression. She is confronted by her friend Julian Mayfield, who introduces her to writer and actor Efua Sutherland, the Director of the National Theatre of Ghana. Sutherland becomes Angelou's "sister-friend" and allows her to cry out all her pain and bitterness.

Most of the action of All God's Children Need Traveling Shoes takes place in Accra, Ghana.

Angelou finds a job at the University of Ghana and "falls in love" with the country and with its people, who remind her of African Americans she knew in Arkansas and California. As the parent of a young adult, she experiences new freedoms, respects Guy's choices, and consciously stops making her son the center of her life. She creates new friendships with her roommates and native Africans, both male and female. She becomes part of a group of American expatriates whom she calls the "Revolutionist Returnees", people such as Mayfield and his wife Ana Livia, who share her struggles.

Angelou strengthens her ties with Africa while traveling through eastern Ghanaian villages, and through her relationships with several Africans. She describes a few romantic prospects, one of which is with a man who proposes that she become his "second wife" and accept West African customs. She also becomes a supporter of Ghana president Kwame Nkrumah and close friends with tribal leader Nana Nketsia and poet Kwesi Brew. During one of her travels through West Africa, a woman identifies her as a member of the Bambara tribe based solely upon her appearance and behavior, which helps Angelou discover the similarities between her American traditions and those of her West African ancestors.

Although Angelou is disillusioned with the nonviolent strategies of Martin Luther King Jr., she and her friends commemorate his 1963 march on Washington by organizing a parallel demonstration in Ghana. The demonstration becomes a tribute to African-American W.E.B. Du Bois, who died the previous evening. A few pages later, she allies herself with Malcolm X, who visits Ghana in 1964 to elicit the support of Black world leaders. He encourages Angelou to return to America to help him coordinate his efforts, as she had done for King in The Heart of a Woman. While driving Malcolm X to the airport, he chastises her for her bitterness about Du Bois' wife Shirley Graham's lack of support for the civil rights movement.

Angelou and her roommates reluctantly hire a village boy named Kojo to do housework for them. He reminds her of her brother Bailey, and he serves as a substitute for her son Guy. She accepts a maternal role with Kojo, helping him with his schoolwork and welcoming the thanks of his family. Traveling Shoes, like Angelou's previous autobiographies, is full of conflicts with Guy, especially surrounding his independence, his separation from his mother, and his choices. When she learns that he is dating a woman older than her, she reacts with anger and threatens to strike him, but he patronizes her, calls her his "little mother", and insists upon his autonomy from her.

The African narrative in Traveling Shoes is interrupted by "a journey within a journey" when she decides to join a theatrical company in a revival of The Blacks, a play by French writer Jean Genet. As she had done in New York City and described in The Heart of a Woman, she plays the White Queen and tours Berlin and Venice with the company, which include Cicely Tyson, James Earl Jones, Lou Gossett Jr., and Roscoe Lee Browne. While in Berlin, she accepts a breakfast invitation with a racist, wealthy German family.

The book ends with Angelou's decision to return to America. At the airport, a group of her friends and associates, including Guy, are present to wish her farewell as she leaves. She metaphorically connects her departure from the African continent and her departure from Guy with the forced enslavement of her ancestors.

== Genre ==
All seven of Angelou's installments of her life story continue the long tradition of African-American autobiography. Starting with I Know Why the Caged Bird Sings, Angelou made a deliberate attempt while writing her books to challenge the usual structure of the autobiography by critiquing, changing, and expanding the genre. Her use of fiction-writing techniques such as dialogue, characterization, and thematic development has often led reviewers to categorize her books as autobiographical fiction. In a 1989 interview, Angelou stated that she was the only "serious" writer to choose the genre to express herself. According to Lupton, Angelou does not report one person's story, but the collective's. She represents the convention in African-American autobiography, which serves as a public gesture that speaks for an entire group of people. As Angelou had done in her previous autobiographies, she uses elements of the African-American slave narrative, including as Lupton puts it, "the journey, the quest for freedom; [and] empathy for the horrors suffered by slaves".

All of Angelou's autobiographies conform to the genre's standard structure: they are written by a single author, they are chronological, and they contain elements of character, technique, and theme. Although Angelou referred to her books as autobiographies in a 1983 interview with African-American literature critic Claudia Tate, she acknowledged that there are fictional aspects to all her books, with the tendency to "diverge from the conventional notion of autobiography as truth". When speaking of her unique use of the genre, Angelou acknowledges that she follows the slave narrative tradition of "speaking in the first-person singular talking about the first-person plural, always saying I meaning 'we'". McPherson states that Angelou is a master of this autobiographical form, especially the "confrontation of the Black self within a society that threatens to destroy it", but departs from it in Traveling Shoes by taking the action to Africa. Lupton, referring to the journey motif in the book, insists that its narrative point of view is "again sustained through the first-person autobiographer in motion".

Angelou recognizes that there are fictional aspects to all her books, although there is less fictionalization in Traveling Shoes than in her previous autobiographies. Her approach parallels the conventions of many African-American autobiographies written during the abolitionist period in the U.S., when truth was often censored for purposes of self-protection. Hagen places Angelou in the long tradition of African-American autobiography, but insists that Angelou has created a unique interpretation of the autobiographical form. Journalist George Plimpton asked her in a 1998 interview if she changed the truth to improve her story; she stated, "Sometimes I make a diameter from a composite of three or four people, because the essence in only one person is not sufficiently strong to be written about". Although Angelou has never admitted to changing the facts in her stories, she fictionalizes them to make an impact and to enhance her readers' interest. Angelou's long-time editor, Robert Loomis, stated that she could have rewritten any of her books by changing the order of her facts to make a different impact on the reader.

Like the slave narrative, which focus on the writers' search for freedom from bondage, modern African-American autobiographers such as Angelou seek to develop "an authentic self" and the freedom to find it in their community. McPherson states, "The journey to a distant goal, the return home, and the quest which involves the voyage out, achievement, and return are typical patterns in Black autobiography". Gagiano calls Traveling Shoes "no simple 'travelling' account" and states that it establishes Angelou as "an existential discoverer". Gagiano recognizes that the book is an autobiography, but "of a very particular kind". Like the other three memoirs Gagiano discusses, Traveling Shoes can be categorized as what she calls "roots tourism", but that it is more rare and introspective because it contains "unusually strong and articulate historical accounts and sociopolitical analysis". Scholar Gregory D. Smithers places Traveling Shoes into the genre of African diasporic travel writing in the Atlantic world. He also states that the book highlights "the autobiographical tradition in black diaspora travel literature and the ambiguous image of Africa among diaspora blacks since the 1980s". Smithers also calls Angelou's autobiographical narratives "historically, quite extraordinary" because Black women of the diaspora did not tend to travel to Africa like she did in the early 1960s. Smithers places Angelou's work "among a small but incredibly gifted group of African American women travel writers", beginning with African Journey (1945), by Elsanda Goode Robeson.

== Style ==
For the first and only time in Angelou's series of autobiographies, she repeats the same episode in detail—her son's automobile accident—at the end of her fourth autobiography, The Heart of a Woman, and the beginning of this one, a technique that both centralizes each installment and connects the two books with each other. It also creates a strong and emotional link between the two autobiographies. Angelou has said that she used this technique so that each book would stand alone and to establish the setting in Traveling Shoes—"who she was and what she was doing in Africa". Additionally, each volume "ends with abrupt suspense".

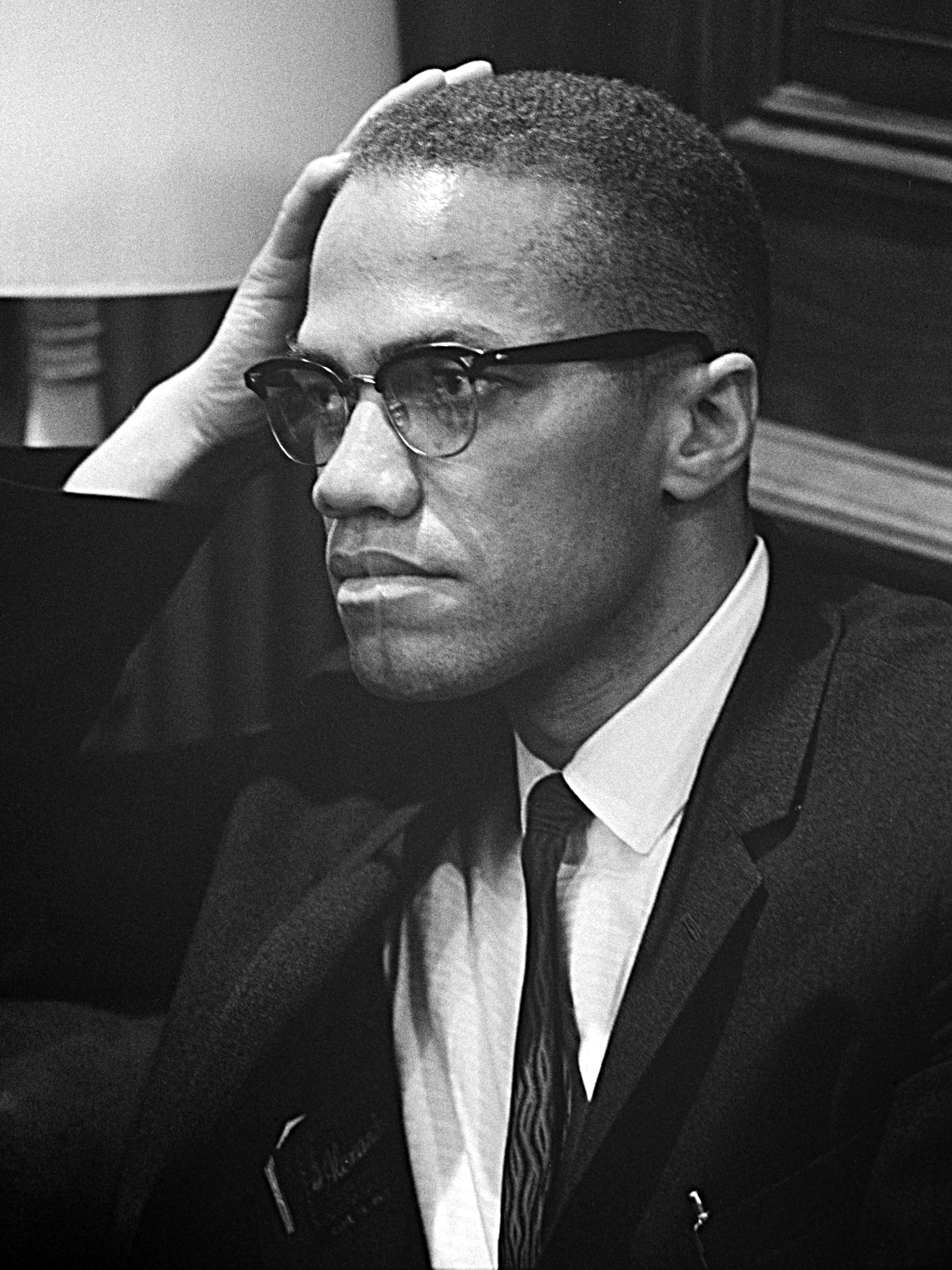
According to Angelou, even though they had met previously, she and Malcolm X (pictured) became friends in Ghana.

In Traveling Shoes, Angelou has matured as a writer, so she was able to experiment with form. For the first time, instead of using traditional numbered chapters, the book consists of anecdotes separated with a few inches of white space. Lupton calls these segments "short stories or vignettes", a technique that Angelou had used before, to portray dynamic characters such as Malcolm X. These stories and vignettes are told within the context of her entire life story, but each vignette can be read or analyzed individually, without harming the text's consistency. Most of Angelou's anecdotes no longer focus on the famous or on her family, but on Ghanaians; for example, according to Lupton, her description of her houseboy, Kojo, is her most delightful character sketch in the book.

In Traveling Shoes, Angelou continues to demonstrate her strengths as an autobiographer, especially her ability to connect emotionally with her audience, which Lupton calls a "superb use of language in recording moments of emotional intensity". As in her previous books, Angelou uses creative metaphors and personifications of abstract objects and concepts. Her descriptions exhibit her advanced abilities as a writer, developed after years of maturity, of "displaying vivid and captivating sentences and phrases". Angelou's self-portrait of a Black woman and her ability to communicate her misfortunes destroys stereotypes and demonstrates "the trials, rejections, and endurances which so many Black women share". Hagen calls Traveling Shoes "reflective" and its writer "introspective and deeply moved".

Even though Traveling Shoes can be read on its own, Angelou connects the events in the book with her previous volumes, as she had done throughout her series. As McPherson states, "Everyday experiences serve as links to Angelou's past and thus embody powerful meanings". Events that occur in the book and Angelou's responses to them evoke earlier moments in her previous books; for example, Angelou responds to her son's accident with muteness, as she had responded to her rape in Caged Bird. As is customary in autobiography in general, she uses the literary convention of flashbacks in order to tie events that occur in the book to its predecessors. She uses humor, another convention she had used before, both to criticize racism and to balance her insights. She also uses quotes from literary sources, especially the Bible, which demonstrates that she has not lost contact with her family roots as she searches for a home and for her identity.

Traveling Shoes is "more tightly controlled" than Angelou's previous books, most likely due to the dominance of the travel motif. Gagiano compares this book with three other travel narratives written by female authors from the West: The Devil that Danced on the Water, by Aminatta Forna; Red Dust Road, by Jackie Kay; and Looking for Transwonderland, by Noo Saro-Wiwa. Setting, always an important element for Angelou, becomes even more important in this book. Unlike her previous books, most of the action in Traveling Shoes occurs in one setting, Accra, which contributes to and is tightly connected with her personal development. Angelou feels ambivalence about living in Ghana, which provides Traveling Shoes with richness and depth. Angelou's inclusion of her tour with The Blacks to Berlin and Venice is a digression that detracts from the African setting, but Lupton sees it as a contribution to Angelou's character development and provides the book with a "universal quality" as Angelou reaches beyond the confines of her personal life and encounters racism in Germany. During this trip, she comes to see her fellow African Americans differently, as more spirited than the Africans she has met in Ghana.

== Themes ==
=== Motherhood ===
A major theme in Traveling Shoes, one that many critics overlook, is Angelou's love for her son. The theme of motherhood and kinship concerns is one of Angelou's most consistent themes throughout her series of autobiographies, although it does not overwhelm this book as it does in Gather Together in My Name and Singin' and Swingin' and Gettin' Merry Like Christmas. Motherhood is present in many of the book's subthemes—her relationship with her houseboy Kojo, her delight in being called "Auntie" by many African children, and her feelings toward "Mother Africa". Traveling Shoes begins with Guy's accident, his long recovery, and his mother's reaction to it, thus universalizing the fear of every parent—the death of a child. The main character is a mother of a grown son, so liberation from the daily responsibilities of motherhood is emphasized, but it is complicated by the recognition that part of motherhood is letting go, something Angelou struggles with. Confrontations between Angelou and Guy are minimal, consisting of their conflict over his choice of dating a much-older woman and of his demands for autonomy after she returns from the Genet tour. Angelou seems to vacillate between wanting to supervise him and wanting to let go throughout the book. In this way, as Lupton says, the motherhood theme, like the identity theme, is "dual in nature".

Like many of her previous books, Angelou is conflicted about her feelings towards Guy, and is skilled at expressing it in Traveling Shoes. One way she expresses her conflict is through her reluctant relationship with Kojo. She compares her feelings for Kojo with the pain of childbirth, and he serves as substitute for Guy. At the end of the book Angelou leaves Guy in Africa to continue his education, suggesting, as Lupton puts it, the "apparent end of the mother/son plot". Lupton also reports that some reviewers have criticized Angelou for "the willful cutting of the maternal ties that she established throughout the series", but Angelou implies in Traveling Shoes that motherhood is never over.

=== Race/Identity ===
Angelou's exploration of her African and African-American identities is an important theme in Traveling Shoes. Gregory D. Smithers, in his comparison of the book with two other travel narratives, Dreams from My Father by Barack Obama (1995) and The Atlantic Sound (2000) by Caryl Phillips, states that Angelou reflects on the meaning of identity among members of the African diaspora and recounts her "experiences, relationships, and collective belonging". The alliances and relationships with those she meets in Ghana contribute to Angelou's identity and growth. Smithers states that the geography and history of the continent of Africa, which "loomed large in her very personal story", as well as her efforts to connect with people of African descent, is core to her quest for individual and collective belonging. Smithers adds that she "explores the existential question of black identity in relation to her image of Africa". Her experiences in Ghana help her come to terms with her personal and historical past, and by the end of the book she is ready to return to America with a deeper understanding of both the African and the American parts of her character. McPherson calls Angelou's parallels and connections between Africa and America her "double-consciousness", which contribute to her understanding of herself.

Angelou is able to recognize similarities between African and African-American culture; as Lupton puts it, the "blue songs, shouts, and gospels" she has grown up with in America "echo the rhythms of West Africa". She recognizes the connections between African and American Black cultures, including the children's games, the folklore, the spoken and non-verbal languages, the food, sensibilities, and behavior. She connects the behavior of many African mother figures, especially their generosity, with her grandmother's behaviors. In one of the most significant sections of Traveling Shoes, Angelou recounts an encounter with a West African woman who recognizes her, on the basis of Angelou's appearance, as a member of the Bambara group of West Africa. (Note: The 2008 documentary African American Lives, produced by Henry Louis Gates Jr., tested Angelou's DNA and found that she was genetically related to the Bambara people.) As Lupton states, these and other experiences in Ghana demonstrate Angelou's maturity as a mother who is able to let go of her adult son, as a woman who is no longer dependent upon a man, and as an American who is able to "perceive the roots of her identity" and how they affect her personality. Angelou comes to terms with her difficult past, both as a descendant of Africans taken forcibly to America as slaves and as an African American who has experienced racism. As she tells interviewer Connie Martinson, she brought her son to Ghana to protect him from the negative effects of racism because she did not think he had the tools to withstand them. She remains in Accra after his accident because it was traumatic for her as well—so traumatic it reduces her to silence, similar to her muteness after she was raped as a child in Caged Bird. Her friend, Julian Mayfield, introduces her to Efua Sutherland, who becomes Angelou's "Sister friend" and allows Angelou to cry out her pain, grief, and fear, something Angelou later admitted went against her American upbringing of emotional restraint.

Racism, an important theme in all of Angelou's autobiographies, continues to be important in Traveling Shoes, but she has matured in the way she deals with it in this book. For the first time in Angelou's life, she "does not feel threatened by racial hate" in Ghana. She discovers that for the first time in her and her son's lives, their skin color was "accepted as correct and normal". She finds a strong support system there, and as Hagen states, she "has come far from the mute, shy little girl of Stamps, Arkansas". As Hagen states, Angelou "is not yet ready to toss off the stings of prejudice, but tolerance and even a certain understanding can be glimpsed". This is demonstrated in Angelou's treatment of the "genocidal involvement of Africans in slave-trading", something that is often overlooked or misrepresented by other Black writers. Angelou recognizes that the racial memory of slavery impacts every interaction with the Ghanaians she meets and interacts with. Writing about it 20 years later, in the 1980s, she also realizes that the formation of one's identity is ongoing, relational, and subjective, and that her and her fellow expatriates' image of Africa was influenced by the history of slavery and of the racism and oppression they experienced in 20th-century America. She comes to the painful realization that "the African identity she projected prior to her arrival in Ghana was not real". She realizes that her identity was that she was an American Black whose emotional energy was focused on the civil rights struggles in the U.S. and that her history was based there, after generations of trauma, which had failed to eradicate her fellow members of the African diaspora who resided in America. As Smithers put it, "Angelou's conclusion is thus built on the humanist ideal of individuals triumphing over great odds, an ethos rooted in American experiences and an American intellectual consciousness". Angelou's image of Africa became what Smithers calls "decentered" after she experienced Africa herself. Smithers suspects that writing about her decentering 20 years later must have been painful for Angelou, but says that it was "necessary to the continued evolution of a meaningful sense of self". For Angelou, Africa changes from "a timeless home with transformative spiritual qualities" to a place that helps American members of the diaspora focus on the history of racial injustice that began with their ancestors' enslavement and work to change it.

Angelou learns lessons about herself and about racism throughout Traveling Shoes, even during her brief tour of Venice and Berlin for The Blacks revival. She revives her passion for African-American culture as she associates with other African Americans. Angelou is also taught an important lesson about combating racism by Malcolm X, who compares it to a mountain in which everyone's efforts, even the efforts of Shirley Graham Du Bois, whom Angelou resents, is needed. She compares her experiences of American racism with Germany's history of racial prejudice and military aggression. The verbal violence of the folk tales shared during her meal with her German hosts and Israeli friend is as significant to Angelou as physical violence, to the point that she becomes ill. Angelou's first-hand experience with fascism, as well as the racist sensibilities of the German family she visits, "help shape and broaden her constantly changing vision" regarding racial prejudice.

=== Journey/Home ===
I never agreed, even as a young person, with the Thomas Wolfe title You Can't Go Home Again. Instinctively I didn't. But the truth is, you can never leave home. You take it with you; it's under your fingernails; it's in the hair follicles; it's in the way you smile; it's in the ride of your hips, in the passage of your breasts; it's all there, no matter where you go. You can take on the affectations and the postures of other places and even learn to speak their ways. But the truth is, home is between your teeth.

--Maya Angelou, 1990

The journey, or travel, is a common theme in American autobiography as a whole; as McPherson states, it is something of a national myth to Americans as a people. The travel motif is seen throughout Angelou's series of autobiographies, emphasizing what Lupton describes as Angelou's "continuing journey of the self". Angelou continues the travel motif in Traveling Shoes, as evidenced in the book's title, but her primary motivation in living in Africa, as she told interviewer George Plimpton, was "trying to get home". Angelou relates her own journey of an African American woman searching for a home, an important word throughout Traveling Shoes. She also describes the journeys of her fellow expatriates, which McPherson compares to the descriptions of white expatriates in Europe in the 1920s by Ernest Hemingway and Henry James. Like in the other autobiographies Gagiano compares with Traveling Shoes, Angelou says very little about the joys and difficulties of life as a member of the African diaspora in her previous home.

Angelou was one of over two hundred Black American expatriates living in Accra at the time. She was able to find a small group of expatriates, humorously dubbed "the Revolutionary Returnees", who became her main source of support as she struggled with her place in African culture—"the conflicting feelings of being 'home' yet simultaneously being 'homeless,' cut off from America without tangible roots in their adopted black nation". For many Black Americans, it was the first time they were able to positively identify with Africa. Angelou describes the group of Black American expatriates as "a little group of Black folks, looking for a home". According to Smithers, Angelou's connection with her fellow expatriates emphasizes the "ambiguity of place" in the book. It also demonstrates "the ontological malleability of identity" that members of the African diaspora who have traveled to Africa have experienced in different times and places.

Reviewer Jackie Gropman has stated that Angelou presents her readers with "a wealth of information and penetrating impressions of the proud, optimistic new country of Ghana". Angelou also presents a romanticized view of and reflections about Africa by a young African American woman searching for her cultural roots. She "falls in love" with Ghana and wishes to settle into her new home "as a baby nuzzles in a mother's arms". Despite this presentation of Africa, however, and despite Angelou's membership in the African diaspora, she does not discover the village of her ancestors until almost the end of book because she lacks sufficient knowledge of Africa to fully understand her personal bonds with Ghana's history, people, and contemporary conditions. It is in the village, however, that Angelou is mistaken by the women inhabitants for a local and feels accepted by them, an experience that helps her affirm her African-American identity and connection with those who were enslaved in the U.S.

Smithers calls Angelou "no ordinary traveler" and Africa "no ordinary place". He goes on to state that Angelou uses her skilled use of metaphors to explore the themes of family, home, and identity to Blacks of the diaspora. At first, she believes that Ghana and the continent of Africa could provide her and her fellow expatriates with a sense of identity and belonging. According to Smithers, the social and political changes taking place in the U.S. during the early 1960s inspired Angelou's initial quest because she felt she had to break ties with her more recent history there in order to find a deeper sense of history and meaning in Ghana. Angelou soon discovers that her fellow Black expatriates "share similar delusions" and that their feelings towards Ghana and its people are not reciprocated. Lupton states, "Angelou's alliance with the African-American community often focuses on their indignation over the Ghanaians' refusal to fully welcome them". Angelou uses the parallel demonstration to King's 1963 March on Washington to demonstrate both her and her fellow expatriates' tenuous relationship with Africa and her desire for full citizenship and assimilation, an "unattainable goal that falls outside of her desire for assimilation" and something she can never acquire in Ghana.

Not only is Angelou a Black American, whether she likes it or not, "she is a Black American in exile". Houston A. Baker Jr., in his review of Traveling Shoes, states that Angelou is unable to experience a connection with what Angelou calls the "soul" of Africa, and that Angelou speculates that only the American Black, forcibly displaced and taken from the home of her ancestors, can truly understand "that home is the place where one is created". Angelou and her fellow expatriates' need to gain recognition by their ancestral homeland is painful, ambiguous, obtained at an emotional cost, and requires coming to terms with the rejection of the Ghanaians they encounter. Gagiano calls this realization a "bitter truth". As Gagiano puts it, Angelou's presence in Ghana "re-evokes awareness" of the horrors experienced by her ancestors at the hands of their enslavers, both African and European/American. Gagiano also states that the "quest for the African homeland is both a journey into the psychic interior and a process of political education".

Angelou's issues are resolved at the end of Traveling Shoes when she decides to leave Guy to continue his education in Accra and return to America. She realizes, even though America is dangerous, it is also nurturing and her true home, and that her duty and destiny lie there. The images of Martin Luther King, Jr., the March on Washington back in the U.S., and Malcolm X's exhortation to return helps her realize that perhaps "Africa was not home after all", but that America was. It also helped her reassess who she was as a Black women of the diaspora and her identity in relation to Africa. The final scene of the book is at the Accra airport, with Angelou surrounded by Guy and her friends as they wish her farewell. Even though she "forsakes her new embraced alliance with Mother Africa," she claims she is "not sad" to be leaving. She calls her departure a "second leave-taking", and compares it to the last time she left her son, with his grandmother in Singin' and Swingin' and Gettin' Merry Like Christmas when he was a child, and to the forced departure from Africa by her ancestors. As Lupton states, "Angelou's journey from Africa back to America is in certain ways a restatement of the historical phase known as mid-passage, when slaves were brutally transported in ships from West Africa to the so-called New World".

== Critical reception ==
All God's Children Need Traveling Shoes was greeted with both praise and disappointment, although reviews of the book were generally positive. According to the Poetry Foundation, "Most critics have judged Angelou's subsequent autobiographies in light of her first, and I Know Why the Caged Bird Sings remains the most highly praised". Hagen states that Traveling Shoes, as in her previous books, demonstrated Angelou's "broad appeal" to both her readers and her critics. The book's accuracy was verified by her close friend and fellow expatriate Julian Mayfield.

Even though Traveling Shoes is Angelou's fifth book in her series of autobiographies, it is able to stand on its own. Houston A. Baker Jr., in his review of the book, calls Angelou "one of the geniuses of Afro-American serial autobiography". Interviewer Connie Martinson told Angelou, "You make me, the reader ... live through it with you". Scholar Eugenia Collier, writing when the possibility of the publication of subsequent autobiographies in Angelou's series was uncertain, considers Traveling Shoes "the apex toward which the other autobiographies have pointed". Hagen calls Traveling Shoes "another professional, rich, full, journeyman text", and sees in this volume a higher-quality of writing, especially her "often lyrical and soaring" prose, than in her previous books. Other reviewers agree. Reviewer Janet A. Blundell found the book "absorbing reading", and reviewer Jackie Gropman states that the "prose sings". Gregory D. Smithers calls Traveling Shoes "a rich and highly reflective memoir". He also states that the importance of the theme of home, as it relates to her personal and collective identification with herself and with her fellow expatriates, makes the book "a compelling example" of how members of the African diaspora "engage in the 'imaginative rediscovery' of Africa in the hope of 'discovering' a meaningful sense of self".

Some critics were less favorable in their views of All God's Children Need Traveling Shoes. Even though the book left interviewer Russell Harris with "a haunting feeling", he found the book more "pedantic" than her previous books, and thought that it contained fewer fictional aspects compared to Angelou's other autobiographies. Scholar John C. Gruesser found the conflicts in Traveling Shoes unresolved and the ending "too easily manufactured at the last minute to resolve the problem of the book". Reviewer Deborah E. McDowell agreed, and found the resolution of the plot to be "stereotyped and unauthentic".

== Works cited ==
- Angelou, Maya (1986). All God's Children Need Traveling Shoes. New York: Random House. ISBN 0-679-73404-X.
- Gagiano, Annie (2019). "Recovering and Recovering from an African Past: Four Women's Quest Narratives". Journal of Transatlantic Studies. 17 (3): 269–289. doi:10.1057/s42738-019-00025-x. ISSN 1754-1018. S2CID 257159808.
- Hagen, Lyman B. (1997). Heart of a Woman, Mind of a Writer, and Soul of a Poet: A Critical Analysis of the Writings of Maya Angelou. Lanham, Maryland: University Press of America. ISBN 0-7618-0621-0.
- Harris, Russell (1989). "Zelo Interviews Maya Angelou". In Elliot, Jeffrey M. (ed.). Conversations with Maya Angelou. Jackson, Mississippi: University Press of Mississippi. pp. 165–172. ISBN 0-87805-362-X.
- Lupton, Mary Jane (1998). Maya Angelou: A Critical Companion. Westport, Connecticut: Greenwood Press. ISBN 0-313-30325-8.
- McPherson, Dolly A. (1990). Order Out of Chaos: The Autobiographical Works of Maya Angelou. New York: Peter Lang Publishing. ISBN 0-8204-1139-6.
- O'Neale, Sondra (1984). "Reconstruction of the Composite Self: New Images of Black Women in Maya Angelou's Continuing Autobiography". In Evans, Mari (ed.). Black Women Writers (1950–1980): A Critical Evaluation. Garden City, New York: Doubleday. pp. 25–36. ISBN 0-385-17124-2.
- Smithers, Gregory D. (2011). "Challenging a Pan-African Identity: The Autobiographical Writings of Maya Angelou, Barack Obama, and Caryl Phillips". Journal of American Studies. 45 (3): 483–502. JSTOR 23016785.
