= Marcia Ann Gillespie =

American activist (1944–2026)

- Born: July 10, 1944; Rockville Centre, New York, U.S.
- Died: October 2026 (aged 82)
- Education: Lake Forest College
- Occupations: Editor; writer; professor; activist
- Known for: Editor-in-chief of Essence and Ms. magazines

Marcia Ann Gillespie (July 10, 1944 – October 31, 2026) was an African-American magazine editor, writer, academic, media and management consultant, and racial and gender justice activist. She previously served as editor-in-chief of Essence magazine and Ms. magazine. She co-authored the authorized biography Maya Angelou: A Glorious Celebration, and was recently working on her own memoir titled When Blacks Became Americans. She taught media and communications at SUNY Old Westbury College as a visiting professor.

== Early life and education ==
Gillespie was born on July 10, 1944, in Rockville Centre, New York, to Charles M. Gillespie and Ethel Young Gillespie. She grew up in a working-class family; her father was a church sexton who also ran a floor-waxing business, and her mother was a domestic worker who operated a catering business. Gillespie and her sister, Charlene Gillespie, grew up in Long Island, New York. She graduated from a mostly white and Jewish high school and then enrolled in Lake Forest College in Lake Forest, Illinois, near Chicago, where she received a B.A. degree in American studies in 1966.

== Career ==
Upon graduation, Gillespie moved to New York City after being employed by Time-Life Books, Inc. as a researcher. In 1970, she was hired as a managing editor at the newly-founded African-American publication Essence magazine. After being promoted to editor-in-chief a year later, at the age of 26, she started the process of transforming Essence into one of the fastest growing women’s publications in the United States, as well as a trusted source of inspiration, information, and affirmation for millions of African-American women readers. In 1980, Gillespie left Essence to join Ms. magazine as a contributing writer. She went on to serve as contributing editor, executive editor, and finally editor-in-chief by 1992, making her the first African-American woman editor-in-chief of a mainstream publication in the United States. Under Gillespie's leadership, Ms. magazine reached the most diverse readership in its history.

During her tenure at Essence, Gillespie also served as vice-president of Essence Communications, from 1975 to 1980, and as a member of the board of directors. Susan L. Taylor, a later editor-in-chief at Essence, would call Gillespie her "greatest encouragement" when she wrote the fashion and beauty pages of the magazine. Taylor said that Gillespie's words "if you can speak you can write," pushed and encouraged her in the days whenever she questioned her writing ability.

Gillespie co-founded Liberty Media for Women, a limited liability corporation composed of women investors, and served as President. The company acquired Ms. magazine in November 1998 and launched the publication in March 1999. Negotiations of the magazine's transfer to the Feminist Majority Foundation, initiated by Gillespie, began in December 2000 and were officially completed by February 2001. In 2001, Gillespie ended her tenure as editor of Ms.

From 1971, Gillespie lectured widely on college and university campuses and to women's groups, and authored innumerable articles and essays.

Gillespie served as a member of the board of directors of the Planned Parenthood Federation of America and the Global Fund for Women. She previously served on the board of directors of the Rod Rodgers Dance Company, the Arthur Ashe Institute of Urban Health, the Black & Jewish Women of New York, and the Violence Policy Center in Washington, D.C. She was also appointed to the advisory board of the Aspen Institute, the New Federal Theater in New York City, and the Studio Museum in Harlem. She was a member of the National Council of Negro Women and the American Association of Magazine Editors.

== Death ==
Gillespie died in October 2026, at the age of 82.

== Awards and recognition ==
Gillespie was a recipient of the Lake Forest College Outstanding Alumni Award (1973); the New York Women in Communications Matrix Award (1978); the New York Association of Black Journalist's Life Achievement Award for Print Journalism; the Mary MacLeod Bethune award from the National Council of Negro Women; the Missouri Honor Medal for Distinguished Service in Journalism from the University of Missouri School of Journalism; and the National Magazine Award. She received a Doctor of Letters degree from her alma mater, Lake Forest College.

In 1982, she was named by the March of Dimes as one of the “Top Ten Outstanding Women in Magazine Publishing”. She was also named by Time magazine as one of the "Fifty Faces for American's Future".

== Works ==
Maya Angelou: A Glorious Celebration (2008), Waterville, Me.: Thorndike Press/Gale Cengage Learning (co-authored with Rosa Johnson Butler and Richard A. Long).
