= We Wear the Mask =

Poem by Paul Laurence Dunbar

"We Wear the Mask" is an 1895 poem in the rondeau form by Paul Laurence Dunbar. It is one of his most famous works and has been cited by several scholars as his best poem. The poem appeared in Dunbar's second volume of poetry.

== Background ==
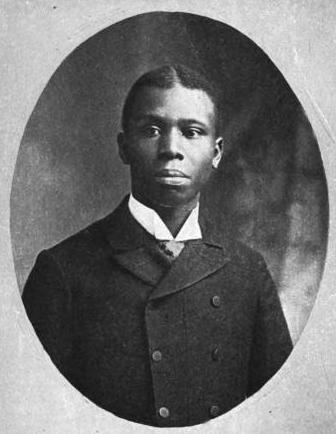
Dunbar in 1897

Paul Laurence Dunbar (1872 – 1906) was an American poet. Born to formerly enslaved people, he became one of the most prominent African-American poets of his time in the 1890s. "We Wear the Mask" was first published in Dunbar's 1895 Majors and Minors, which was his second volume of poems.

== Text ==
We wear the mask that grins and lies,
It hides our cheeks and shades our eyes,—
This debt we pay to human guile;
With torn and bleeding hearts we smile,
And mouth with myriad subtleties.

Why should the world be over-wise,
In counting all our tears and sighs?
Nay, let them only see us, while
We wear the mask.

We smile, but, O great Christ, our cries
To thee from tortured souls arise.
We sing, but oh the clay is vile
Beneath our feet, and long the mile;
But let the world dream otherwise,
We wear the mask!

== Reception ==
The poem, a rondeau, has been cited as one of Dunbar's most famous poems.

In her introduction to The Collected Poetry of Paul Laurence Dunbar, the literary critic Joanne Braxton deemed "We Wear the Mask" one of Dunbar's most famous works and noted that it has been "read and reread by critics". The poem is written from a "we" point of view, which represents the "black folk collective", according to Braxton. Braxton considers "We Wear the Mask" to be a protest poem which showed "strong racial pride". Across the three stanzas, the world is unaware of the struggle of black people. Martin and Hudson write that "Dunbar was persuaded that the world was an affair of masks, that he could reveal himself only by the way he concealed himself, that the truths of his being were masked" and conclude that similar sentiments were later expressed by poets such as Robert Frost and W. B. Yeats, as well as civil rights activists such as W. E. B. Du Bois in his work The Souls of Black Folk.

Peter Revell, Dunbar's biographer, described "We Wear the Mask" as "arguably the finest poem Dunbar produced" and drew parallels to the later Peau Noire Masques Blancs by Frantz Fanon. Dunbar was perhaps best known for writing poems in "African-American dialect", but abandoned that style in this poem. The mask may refer to African Americans being forced to conform to stereotypes forced upon them by white society, such as Dunbar's dialect poems, which he at times felt confined to writing. Dunbar is saying that African Americans were only seen for their "mask", or through the mold that white society forced them to fill. Dunbar is expressing the idea of a "double consciousness", which civil rights activists would later adopt. The metaphor of a mask also says that African Americans are "preeminently commodities" and "marginally" citizens, according to the scholar Willie J. Harrell Jr. The scholar Daniel P. Black considered "We Wear the Mask" Dunbar's magnum opus but described it as a risk that "could have cost him his life, and indeed ... undoubtedly would have—had nineteenth-century readers comprehended fully the poem's multiple meanings."
