= "Encore, Robeson!" =

Studio album by Paul Robeson
- Released: 1960
- Label: Monitor

Professional ratings
Review scores
Source	Rating
Billboard	Positive ("Spotlight" pick)

"Encore, Robeson!", subtitled Paul Robeson: Favorites, Vol. 2, is a studio album by Paul Robeson, released on Monitor in 1960.

== Track listing ==
The album was originally issued in 1960 as a long-playing record, catalog numbers MP 581 (mono) and MPS 581 (stereo).

Side A
No.	Title	Length
1.	"Skye Boat Song"
2.	"Sholk fein kind"
3.	"Now Sleeps the Crimson Petal"
4.	"Dans le printemps"
5.	"Passing By"
6.	"Little Gal"
7.	"O Mistress Mine"
8.	"Kevin Barrey"
9.	"Zvornost" ("Freedom")

Side B
No.	Title	Length
1.	"No More Auction"
2.	"Some Day He'll Make It Plain to Me"
3.	"Didn't My Lord Deliver Daniel"
4.	"Bear the Burden in the Heat of the Day"
5.	"Mount Zion: "On My Journey""
6.	"I'm Gonna Let It Shine"
7.	"Let Us Break Bread Together on Our Knees"
8.	"Amazing Grace"
