= On My Journey Now =

Spiritual popularized by Paul Robeson

"Mount Zion: "On My Journey""

Song by Paul Robeson

from the album "Encore, Robeson!"
- Released: 1960
- Genre: Spirituals
- Label: Monitor

"On My Journey Now, Mount Zion" is a spiritual popularized by Paul Robeson.

== Recordings ==
- The Fairfield Four "On My Journey Now/Love Like a River", Dot, 1950
- Paul Robeson 1960
- The Weavers 1964
- Nat Adderley, on Live at Memory Lane

Lloyd L. Brown. 1997 published a partial biography, The Young Paul Robeson: On My Journey Now (Westview Press.)
