= Claudia Tate =

American literary critic (1947–2002)

- Born: Rosa Cuthbert; December 14, 1947; Long Branch, New Jersey, U.S.
- Died: July 29, 2002 (aged 54); Fair Haven, New Jersey, US
- Education: University of Michigan; Harvard University
- Occupations: Literary critic and professor
- Notable work: Black Women Writers at Work

Claudia Tate (December 14, 1947 – July 29, 2002) was a noted literary critic and professor of English and African American Studies at Princeton University. She is credited with moving African-American literary criticism into the realm of psychology.

== Life and career ==
Tate was born in Long Branch, New Jersey. She earned her bachelor's degree from the University of Michigan and her Ph.D. from Harvard University. She taught at the historic black school Howard University for 12 years before teaching at George Washington University. She then decided to teach African-American studies at Princeton University.

Tate's most notable scholarly book is Black Women Writers at Work. She was also the author of two other major works, Domestic Allegories of Political Desire: The Black Heroine's Text at the Turn of the Century (1992) and Psychoanalysis and Black Novels: Desire and the Protocols of Race (1998).

Tate died of lung cancer in 2002, aged 54, in Fair Haven, New Jersey.
