= Paul du Feu =

Welsh model (1935–2013)

- Born: Paul Bernard du Feu; September 1935; Wrexham, Wales
- Died: 1 January 2013 (aged 77); Oakland, California, U.S.
- Education: King's College London
- Spouses: Shirley Thompson (m. 1956; div. 1968) Germaine Greer (m. 1968; div. 1973) Maya Angelou (m. 1974; div. 1983)
- Children: 2

Paul Bernard du Feu (September 1935 – 1 January 2013) was a Welsh man best known for his marriages to the feminist Germaine Greer and the poet Maya Angelou.

In 1973, he published the memoir Let's Hear It for the Long-legged Women.

== Life ==
Born in 1935 in Wrexham, Wales, the son of a civil servant, du Feu grew up in London. His French surname came from ancestors who settled in the Channel Islands.

He attended King's College London, studying English literature, during which time he married Shirley Thompson, with whom he had two children. After graduating, he worked as a builder.

=== Marriage to Germaine Greer ===
In 1968, after being discharged from the hospital where he had been treated for alcohol poisoning, du Feu met Germaine Greer, then an assistant lecturer at the University of Warwick, outside a pub in Portobello Road, and after a brief courtship they married at Paddington Registry Office. Though their marriage officially lasted five years, their relationship lasted only three weeks. Greer later recalled that she had been unfaithful to du Feu seven times during their short relationship, and she had spent her wedding night in an armchair because her husband, drunk, would not let her in bed. Eventually, during a party near Ladbroke Grove, "[h]e turned to me and sneered (drunk as usual): 'I could have any woman in this room.' 'Except me,' I said, and walked away forever.'"

After this, du Feu posed in British Cosmopolitan, thought to be their first almost-naked male centrefold. In 1973, he also published an erotic memoir, Let's Hear It for the Long-legged Women, for which it is claimed he was paid more than Greer had been given as the advance for her 1970 work The Female Eunuch.

=== Marriage to Maya Angelou ===
Du Feu met Maya Angelou in Soho in 1971 at a literary event for her best-selling autobiography, I Know Why the Caged Bird Sings. They married in 1974, and exchanged vows two further times, but divorced in 1983. They remained friends, and Angelou helped du Feu financially during his later years.

=== Later life ===
Du Feu spent the rest of his life in California, both in Berkeley and later in Oakland, where he worked in home renovation. He died in January 2013.
