= Richard A. Long =

American cultural historian and writer (1927–2013)

- Born: Richard Alexander Long; February 9, 1927; Philadelphia, Pennsylvania U.S.
- Died: January 3, 2013 (aged 85); Atlanta, Georgia, U.S.
- Occupations: Cultural historian Author
- Years active: 1975–2013

Richard A. Long (February 9, 1927 – January 3, 2013) was an American cultural historian and author, who has been called "one of the great pillars of African-American arts and culture". As an academic, he taught at University of Pennsylvania, University of Paris, University of Poitiers, Atlanta University, Emory University, Morgan State College and West Virginia State College, and had worked as a visiting lecturer at universities in Africa and India.

== Early life and education ==
Richard Alexander Long was the fourth of six children born to Thaddeus B. Long and Leila Washington in Philadelphia, Pennsylvania. He graduated from Temple University, where he received his B.A. in 1947 and M.A. in 1948. He did doctoral studies at the University of Pennsylvania, was a Fulbright Scholar at the University of Paris, and received his PhD from the University of Poitiers in France in 1965.

== Career ==
Having begun his teaching career as a graduate assistant at Temple University, Long subsequently taught at West Virginia State College. He also spent a decade and a half as a teacher at Morgan State College (now University). He taught English and French at the Hampton Institute and was also director of its College Museum. At Hampton in 1968 he founded the Triennial Symposium on African Art, now an annual conference at Atlanta University's Center for African and African American Studies.

In 1968 he became a professor of English at Atlanta University (now Clark Atlanta University), where he was founder of the African American Studies program. From 1971 to 1973 he was visiting lecturer at Harvard University.

In 1973, he began a long and distinguished tenure at Emory University. In 1987, he was named the Atticus Haygood Professor of Interdisciplinary Studies in the Graduate Institute of the Liberal Arts. In 2001, he retired from the Emory faculty and received emeritus status. In October 2004, Long was the featured guest at Emeritus College’s Alumni-Emeriti Teacher Appreciation Celebration at Emory. To honor his legacy, the Richard A. Long / HBCU Fellowship was established to assist graduate students conducting research at Rose Library's African American collections at Emory.

Long served as a consultant and as a committee member of many cultural organizations and institutions, including the Second World Black and African Festival of Arts and Culture, both the National Endowment for the Arts and the National Endowment for the Humanities, the Smithsonian Museum of African Art, the High Museum of Art, the Society of Dance History Scholars, and the Zora Neale Hurston Festival. In addition, Long served on the editorial boards of several publications, including the Langston Hughes Bulletin, Phylon and the Zora Neale Hurston Bulletin.

Long died at home on January 3, 2013, at the age of 85.

== Writings ==
Long began his literary career in 1985 with Black Americana, and later published books such as The Black Tradition in American Dance (1989), African Americans: A Portrait (1993), Grown Deep: Essays on the Harlem Renaissance (1998) and One More Time: Harlem Renaissance History and Historicism (2007). He was co-author with Marcia Ann Gillespie and Rosa Johnson Butler of Maya Angelou: A Glorious Celebration (2008).

His papers are deposited at the Atlanta Fulton Public Library's Auburn Avenue Research Library.

== Art collection ==
Long maintained a notable art collection that included works by Amalia Amaki, William Artis, Radcliffe Bailey, Romare Bearden, Beauford Delaney, Sam Gilliam, Henry Ossawa Tanner, Alma Thomas, Mildred Thompson, Hale Woodruff, and others. In October 2014, pieces of his collection were deaccessioned by his estate and auctioned at Swann Galleries.

== Selected bibliography ==
- Black Americana, 1985
- The Black Tradition in American Dance, Rizzoli, 1989
- African Americans: A Portrait, 1993
- Grown Deep: Essays on the Harlem Renaissance, 1998
- One More Time: Harlem Renaissance History and Historicism, 2007
- With Marcia Ann Gillespie and Rosa Johnson Butler, Maya Angelou: A Glorious Celebration, 2008
