= Joanne Braxton =

American author, teacher, and literary critic

Joanne M. Braxton
- Born: 25 May 1950 (age 76)
- Education: Sarah Lawrence College
- Occupations: Author, teacher and literary critic
- Title: Dr

Joanne Margaret Braxton (born May 25, 1950) is an American author, teacher, and literary critic. She has written about topics including Maya Angelou and the book Black Women Writing Autobiography. Braxton has also edited works such as Wild Women in the Whirlwind: Afra-American Culture and the Contemporary Literary Renaissance and a collection of Paul Laurence Dunbar's poetry. She is an emeritus Frances L. and Edwin L. Cummings Professor of the Humanities at the College of William & Mary, and President of the Board of the Braxton Institute.

== Biography ==
Joanne Margaret Braxton was born on May 25, 1950, in Lakeland, Maryland, to Harry McHenry Braxton and Mary Ellen Weems Braxton. She is the second born and has 3 brothers; James, Harry Jr. and Douglas, respectively. She attended the Northwestern Senior High School in Hyattsville, Maryland. She has a B.A. from Sarah Lawrence College and an M.A. and Ph.D. from Yale University, and an M.Div. from the Samuel DeWitt Proctor School of Theology of Virginia Union University. Braxton is also known as "Jodi".

She has published some of her own poetry, including the 1977 collection Sometimes I Think of Maryland, which was praised by Gwendolyn Brooks. As a literary critic, Braxton has written about topics including Maya Angelou and the books Black Women Writing Autobiography. She based Black Women Writing Autobiography on her dissertation. Braxton has also edited works such as Wild Women in the Whirlwind: Afra-American Culture and the Contemporary Literary Renaissance and a collection of Paul Laurence Dunbar's poetry. She has taught at universities including Yale and the University of Michigan and is currently an emeritus Frances L. and Edwin L. Cummings Professor of the Humanities at the College of William & Mary, where she directs the Middle Passage Project. Braxton is also CEO and President of the Board of the Braxton Institute for Human Sustainability Resiliency and Joy.

Braxton has won an Outstanding Educator Award from the State Council of Higher Education for Virginia and several lifetime achievement awards, including an Oni Award in 2002 from the International Black Women's Congress "for uncompromising commitment to uplifting the lives of African people."
