= List of awards and honors received by Maya Angelou =

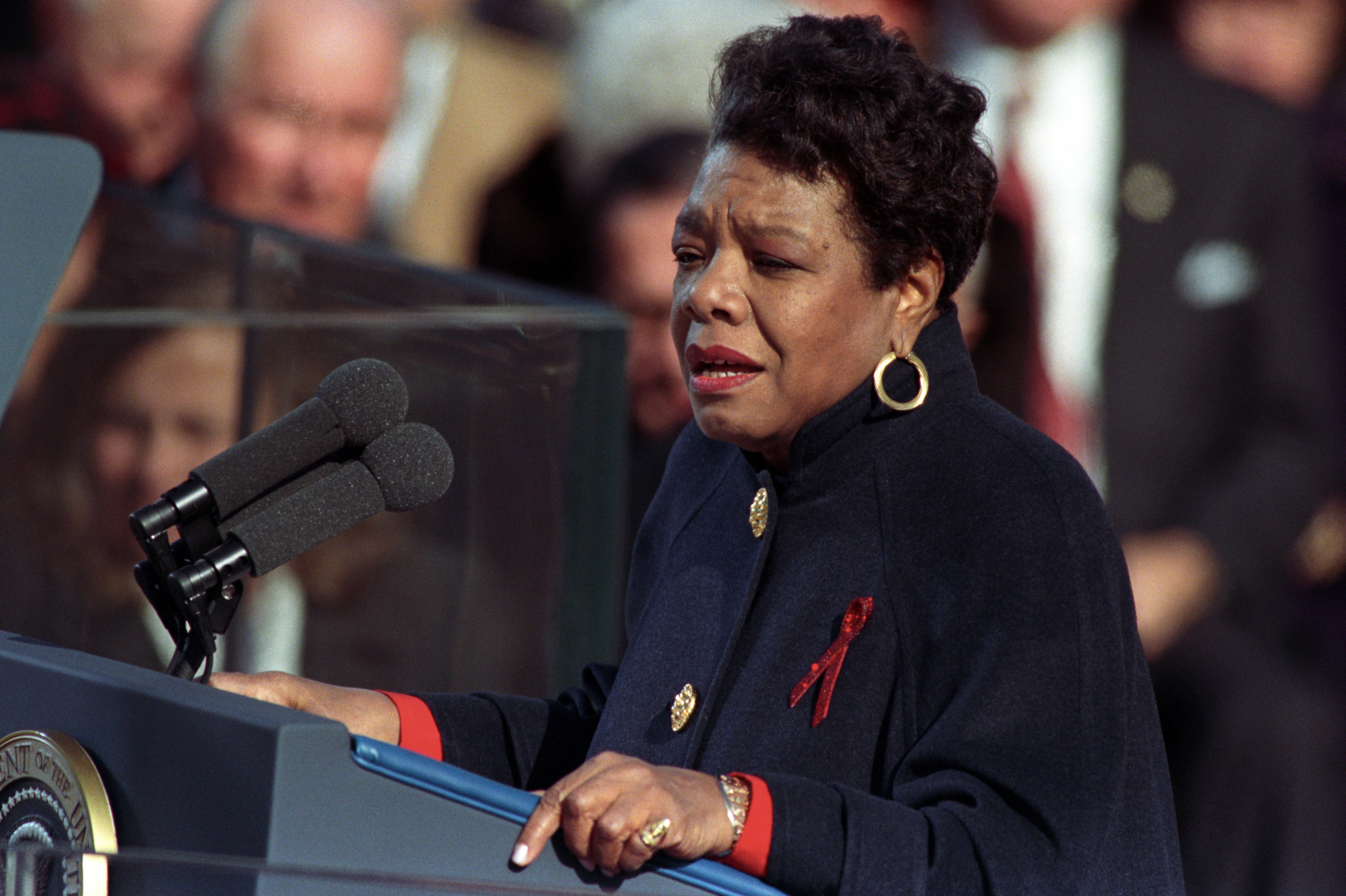
Maya Angelou reciting her poem "On the Pulse of Morning" at President Bill Clinton's inauguration in 1993.

African-American writer and poet Maya Angelou (1928–2014) was honored by universities, literary organizations, government agencies, and special interest groups. Her honors include a Pulitzer Prize nomination for her book of poetry Just Give Me a Cool Drink of Water 'fore I Diiie, a Tony Award nomination for her role in the 1973 play Look Away, and three Grammys from five nominations for her spoken-word albums. Beginning in 1982, Angelou held the first lifetime Reynolds Professorship of American Studies at Wake Forest University in Winston-Salem, North Carolina.

She served on two presidential committees – for Gerald Ford in 1975 and for Jimmy Carter in 1977. In 2000, she was awarded the National Medal of Arts by President Bill Clinton. In 2010, she was awarded the Presidential Medal of Freedom, the highest civilian honor in the U.S., by President Barack Obama. More than thirty health care and medical facilities have been named after Angelou. She was awarded more than 50 honorary degrees.

== Awards ==
Year	Honor	Notes	Ref.
1970	Chubb Fellowship	Given by Yale University, provides the recipient with an opportunity to make a public address open to the Yale and New Haven communities, as well as a meal, reception, or seminar with groups of students and faculty	
1971	Coretta Scott King Award	Given to African-American authors and illustrators of books for children and young people	
1972	Pulitzer Prize nomination	For Angelou's first book of poetry, Just Give Me a Cool Drink of Water 'fore I Diiie	
1973	Tony Award nomination	For her role in the Broadway play Look Away	
1975–76	Member, American Revolution Bicentennial Council	Appointed by President Gerald Ford; The council developed and planned activities and events celebrating the 200th anniversary of the American Revolution.	
1975	Rockefeller Foundation Bellagio Center Resident	Competitive residency program at the foundation's property in Bellagio, Italy, where scholars and artists from all over the world work on projects of their own choosing for a period of four weeks.	
1976	Ladies' Home Journal "Woman of the Year in Communication" Award	Yearly award given by the magazine	
1977	Member, Presidential Commission for International Women's Year	Appointed by President Jimmy Carter, the commission was established to make recommendations to end barriers to women's equality in the U.S.	
1981	Reynold's Professor of American Studies, Wake Forest University	Lifetime appointment	
1983	Ladies' Home Journal "Top 100 Most Influential Women"	Yearly award given by the magazine	
1983	Matrix Award	Given by the New York Association for Women in Communications to women who excel in the field of communication	
1984	Member, North Carolina Arts Council	Committee that gives recommendations to the state's art counsel, especially its policies regarding the arts	
1986	Fulbright Program 40th Anniversary Distinguished Lecturer	Recognition by the U.S. Department of State for African Americans who have contributed to "increase mutual understanding between the people of the United States and the people of other countries ..."	
1987	North Carolina Award in Literature	Highest honor bestowed by North Carolina; recognizes residents for contributions in scholarship, research, the fine arts, and public leadership	
1990	Golden Plate Award, Academy of Achievement	Given for accomplishments in the sciences, business, industry, arts, literature, sports, entertainment, and public service	
1990	Candace Award, National Coalition of 100 Black Women	Given to African-American women for leadership and achievement	
1991	Langston Hughes Medal	Awarded to African-American writers who explore their cultural heritage	
1992	Horatio Alger Award	Yearly award to those "who have overcome adversity and made significant contributions in their fields"	
1992	Distinguished Woman of North Carolina award	Given by the North Carolina Council for Women to women who make major contributions in the arts, business, education, government, recreation, or volunteerism	
1992	Crystal Award	Honors women who have helped expand the role of women in entertainment	
1992	St. Louis Walk of Fame	Honors individuals from the St. Louis, Missouri area who made major national contributions to our cultural heritage.	
1993	Inaugural Poet	Named for reading her poem "On the Pulse of Morning" at President Bill Clinton's inauguration	
1993	Arkansas Black Hall of Fame	Part of the first group of those native to Arkansas honored as role models for young people	
1993	Grammy, "Best Spoken Word Album"	First Grammy, for inaugural poem "On the Pulse of Morning"	
1994	Rollins College Walk of Fame	Stone dedicated on campus walkway made up of rocks and bricks from the homes of over 600 historical figures	
1994	Spingarn Medal	Given by the National Association for the Advancement of Colored People (NAACP) for outstanding achievement by an African American	
1995	Frank G. Wells American Teachers Award	Recognizes those outside the teaching profession who teach	
1995	Grammy, "Best Spoken Word or Non-Musical Album"	For Angelou's performance of her poem Phenomenal Woman	
1996	American Ambassador	Given by UNICEF to assist with their fundraising efforts	
1997	Homecoming Award	Given every two years by the Oklahoma Center for Poets and Writers to authors from the U.S. South and Southwest	
1998	NAACP Image Award	Outstanding Literary Work, Nonfiction for “Even the Stars Look Lonesome,”	
1998	Alston-Jones International Civil & Human Rights Award	Bestowed by the International Civil Rights Center & Museum in Greensboro, North Carolina, honoring individuals who have contributed to the Civil Rights Movement	
1998	National Women's Hall of Fame	Inducted for making contributions to society and for the freedom and progress of women	
1999	Christopher Award	The Christophers' annual media award, given to Angelou for her directorial debut (Down in the Delta)	
1999	Shelia Award	Given by the Tubman African American Museum annually to "extraordinary black women of achievement"	
2000	National Medal of Arts	Awarded by President Bill Clinton; Selected by the U.S. National Endowment for the Arts and awarded by the President of the United States to Americans who have contributed to the arts and culture	
2002	Lifetime Achievement Award	Given as part of the Ethnic Multicultural Media Awards (EMMAs) presented at the annual Hay Festival of Literature & Arts in Wales	
2002	Grammy, "Best Spoken Word Album"	For the audio book of A Song Flung Up to Heaven, Angelou's sixth autobiography	
2003	Museum of Tolerance "Finding Our Families, Finding Ourselves" multimedia exhibit	Featured with Billy Crystal, Joe Torre, and Carlos Santana	
2004	Charles Evans Hughes Award	Presented by the National Conference for Community and Justice for civic and humanitarian contributions	
2005	NAACP Image Awards	Outstanding Literary Work, Nonfiction for Hallelujah! The Welcome Table	
2005	Heart's Day Honoree	Presented during Howard University English Department's annual celebration and conference	
2006	Mother Teresa Award	Presented by the St. Bernadette Institute of Sacred Art in Albuquerque, New Mexico, after being nominated by the public at large	
2007	Martha Parker Legacy Award	Given by the Cleo Parker Robinson Dance studio in Denver; attendees of the ceremony were served dishes from Angelou's cookbook Hallelujah! The Welcome Table	
2008	Voice of Peace award	First recipient of award presented by the Hope for Peace and Justice Center in Dallas; also in honor of Angelou's 80th birthday	
2008	Gracie Award	Honors accomplishments in the media; for Angelou's radio show on XM Radio	
2008	Marian Anderson Award	Honors "artists whose leadership benefits humanity"	
2008	Lincoln Medal	Presented by Ford's Theatre to those who exemplify the legacy and character embodied by President Abraham Lincoln	
2009	Literary Award	Given by the Black Caucus of the American Library Association, recognizing excellence in adult fiction and nonfiction written by African Americans	
2009	NAACP Image Awards	Outstanding Literary Work, Nonfiction for Letter to My Daughter	
2010	Presidential Medal of Freedom	The highest American civilian honor; awarded by President Barack Obama	
2012	Black Cultural Society Award	Given by Elon University in North Carolina, for humanitarian contributions for the promotion of world cultures	
2013	Literarian Award	Given by the National Book Foundation	
2013	Norman Mailer Prize (Lifetime Achievement)	Given by the Norman Mailer Center and The Norman Mailer Writers Colony to celebrate writers and their works	
2014	Conference of Minority Transportation Officials Lifetime Achievement award	Given to celebrate the contributions of women leaders who work in transportation, and to recognize Angelou for being the first Black female streetcar conductor in San Francisco.	
2015	Stamp issued by the U.S. Postal Service	The stamp features a quote, "A bird doesn't sing because it has an answer, it sings because it has a song", which was often cited by Angleou during interviews, but was written by Joan Walsh Anglund in 1967. President Obama wrongly attributed the sentence to Angelou during the presentation of the 2013 National Medal of Arts and National Humanities Medal.	
2017	Residence hall named in Angelou's honor at Wake Forest University.	The first building at Wake Forest named for an African-American and the second named for a female faculty member.	
2018	Google Doodle	In honor of what would have been Angelou's 90th birthday (April 4)	
2019	Butler Banner project	Angelou was included in the list of names of women writers on a banner placed above the names of male writers etched at the top of Butler Library at Columbia University.	
2022	American Women quarters	Will be one of the first two prominent American women honored in the coin series	

== Honorary degrees ==
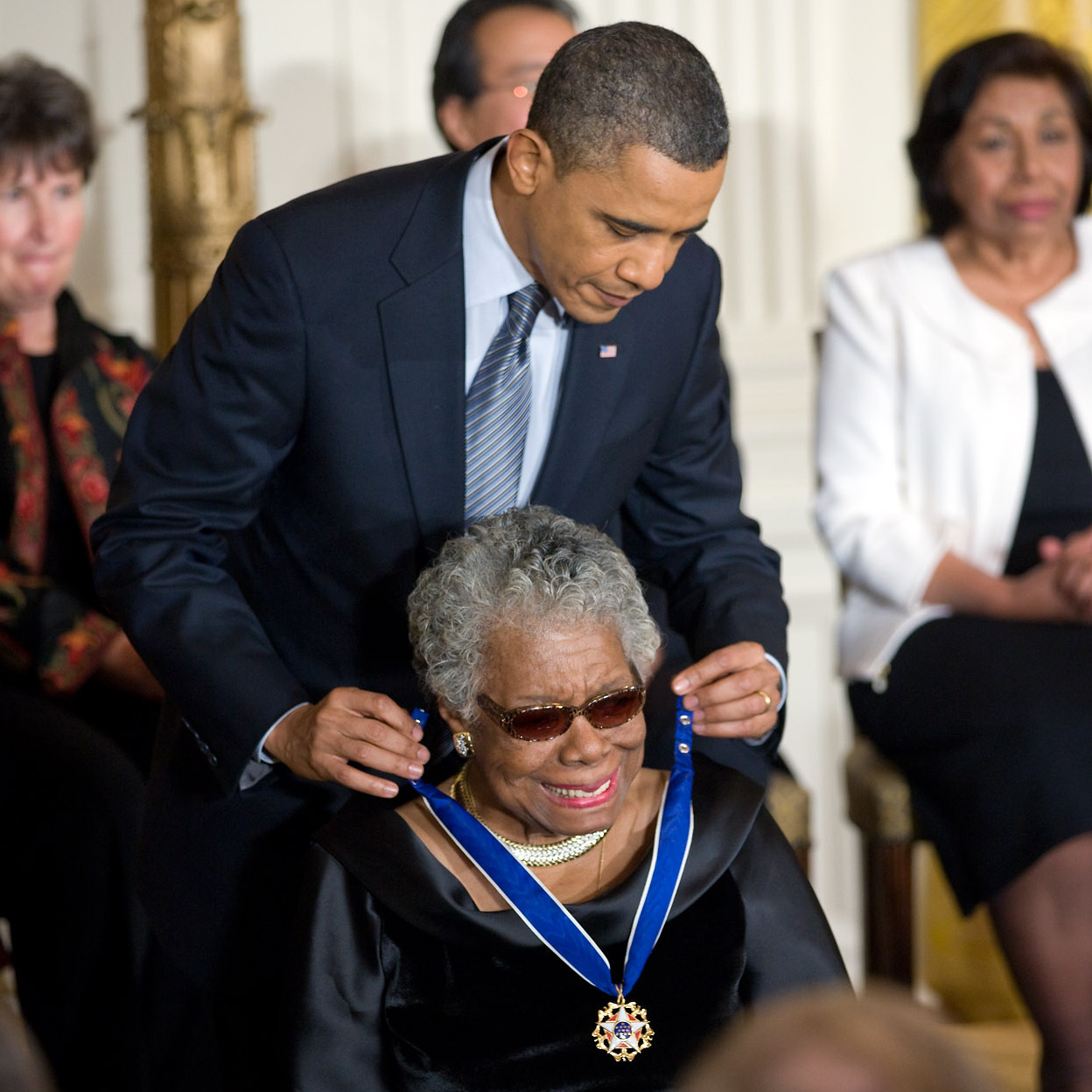
President Barack Obama presenting Angelou with the Presidential Medal of Freedom, 2011

- Smith College, 1975
- Mills College, 1975
- Lawrence University, 1976
- Wake Forest University, 1977
- Columbia College Chicago, 1979
- Wheaton College, 1981
- Boston College, 1983
- Rollins College, 1985
- Howard University, 1985
- Tufts University, 1985
- Mount Holyoke College, 1987
- University of Southern California, 1989
- Northeastern University, 1992
- University of North Carolina at Greensboro, 1993
- Lafayette College, 1999
- Hope College, 2001
- University of Illinois at Urbana-Champaign, 2003
- Eastern Connecticut State University, 2003
- Chapman University, 2007
- Shenandoah University, 2008
- University of Redlands, 2011

== Works cited ==
- Gillespie, Marcia Ann, Rosa Johnson Butler, and Richard A. Long. (2008). Maya Angelou: A Glorious Celebration. New York: Random House. ISBN 978-0-385-51108-7
- Lupton, Mary Jane (1998). Maya Angelou: A Critical Companion. Westport, Connecticut: Greenwood Press. ISBN 0-313-30325-8
