= Woman Work =

Poem by Maya Angelou

- by Maya Angelou
- Country: United States
- Genre(s): Feminism

"Woman Work" is a poem composed by Maya Angelou. In this poem, Angelou writes about the work women often do, and she expresses a wish to rest from the many tasks women have to complete.
