= Maya Angelou Birthplace =

Birthplace of writer and activist, Maya Angelou in St. Louis, Missouri

Coordinates: 38.622798°N 90.229746°W

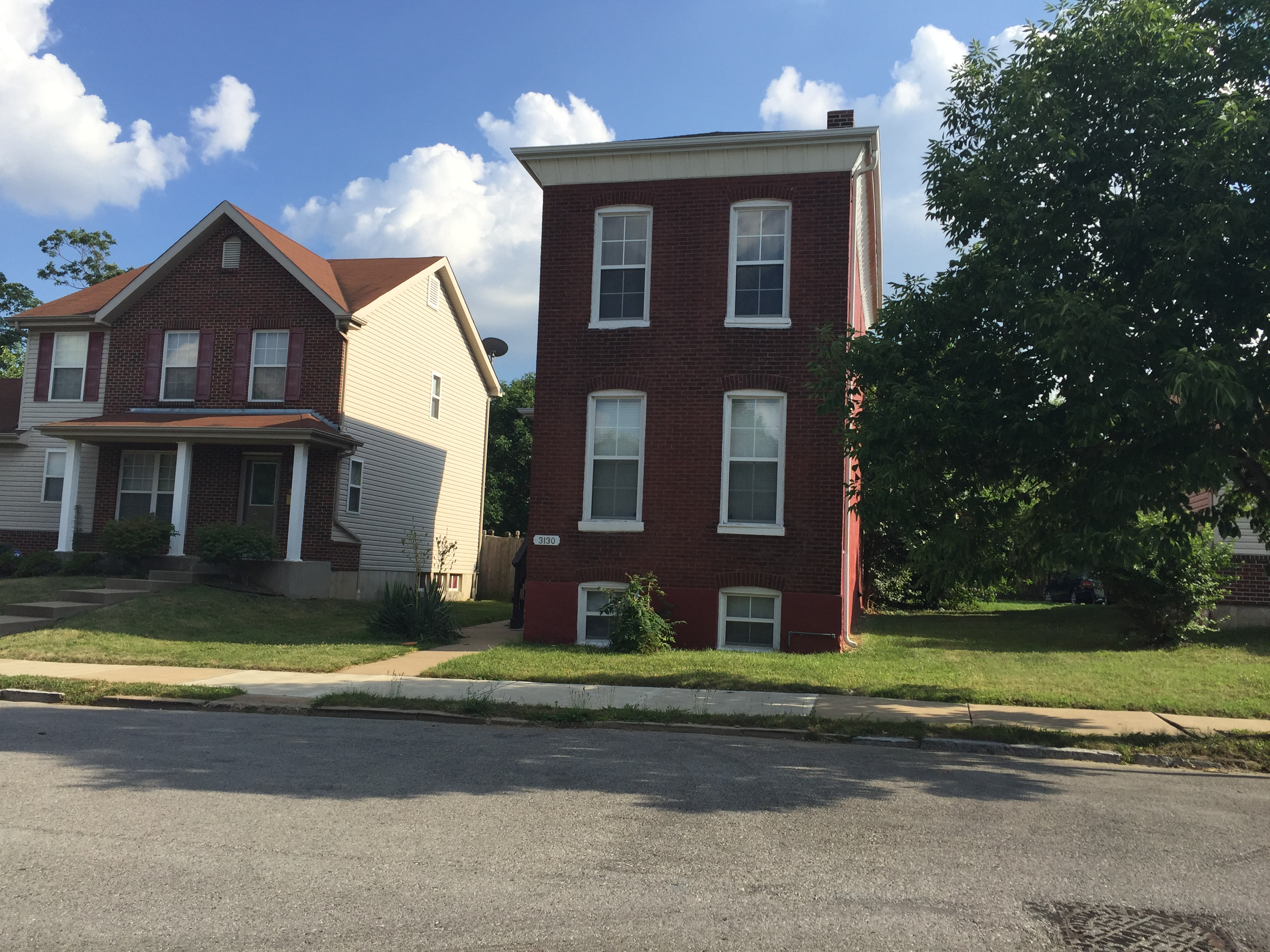

General information
- Location: 3120 Hickory Street, St. Louis, Missouri, United States
- Year built: 1875 or earlier

Technical details
- Floor count: 2
- Floor area: 1,100 square feet (100 m^{2})

Design and construction
- Designations: St. Louis Landmark
- Known for: Birthplace of Maya Angelou

The Maya Angelou Birthplace in St. Louis, Missouri is a 19th-century two-story home where writer, poet and activist Maya Angelou was born and spent the first three years of her life. The house, at 3120 Hickory Street, lies in the Gate District of St. Louis. When her parents divorced in 1931, Angelou and her brother, Bailey were sent to live with their grandmother in Arkansas. They returned to St. Louis four years later and lived in a different home in the same neighborhood. Angelou and her brother returned to Arkansas in 1936 and later moved to California in the early 1940s. After Angelou's death in 2014, the house was officially recognized as a St. Louis City Landmark.

== Description ==
The brick two-story house at 3130 Hickory Street, now in the Gate District of St. Louis, was originally part of the neighborhood of "Compton Hill" when Angelou and her family live there. The Compton and Dry Pictorial St. Louis: The Great Metropolis of the Mississippi Valley. A Topographical Survey Drawn in Perspective A.D. 1875, illustrates that the Hickory Street house, which was visible in the published survey, was built in 1875 or earlier. The Compton Hill neighborhood was originally a working-class white neighborhood. In 1916, a new segregation law was passed in St. Louis that prevented any potential homeowner from moving to a neighborhood in which more than 75% of the residents were another race. By the time Angelou was born, Compton Hill was a segregated African American community. The neighborhood is bordered by Jefferson Avenue to the east, Lafayette Avenue to the south, Grand Boulevard to the west and the railroad tracks to the north. Many in the neighborhood worked at the nearby rail yards.

The St. Louis Board of Aldermen designated the house as a city landmark in 2015 after Angelou's death in 2014.

== History ==
Angelou was born Marguerite Annie Johnson on April 4, 1928, in the home of her maternal grandparents at 3130 Hickory Street in St. Louis, Missouri. She lived in the house with her brother, Bailey, her parents, and grandparents. In 1931, Angelou's parents divorced and Angelou and her brother were sent to live with their paternal grandmother, Annie Henderson, in Stamps, Arkansas. In 1935, Angelou and her brother returned to St. Louis. They lived with their mother and grandparents at 2714 1/2 Caroline Street. Angelou and Bailey attended Toussaint L’Ouverture Elementary School, which was originally named Colored School No 4, but was renamed in 1890 after the black leader of the Haitian Revolution. In 1936, after Angelou had been raped by her mother's boyfriend, she and her brother were sent back to Arksansas to live with their grandmother. In 1942, 14-year old Angelou moved to Oakland, California to live with her mother.

== See also ==
- I Know Why the Caged Bird Sings: 1969 autobiography of Maya Angelou
- List of Maya Angelou works
- List of residences of American writers
