= Now Sheba Sings the Song =

Book by Maya Angelou

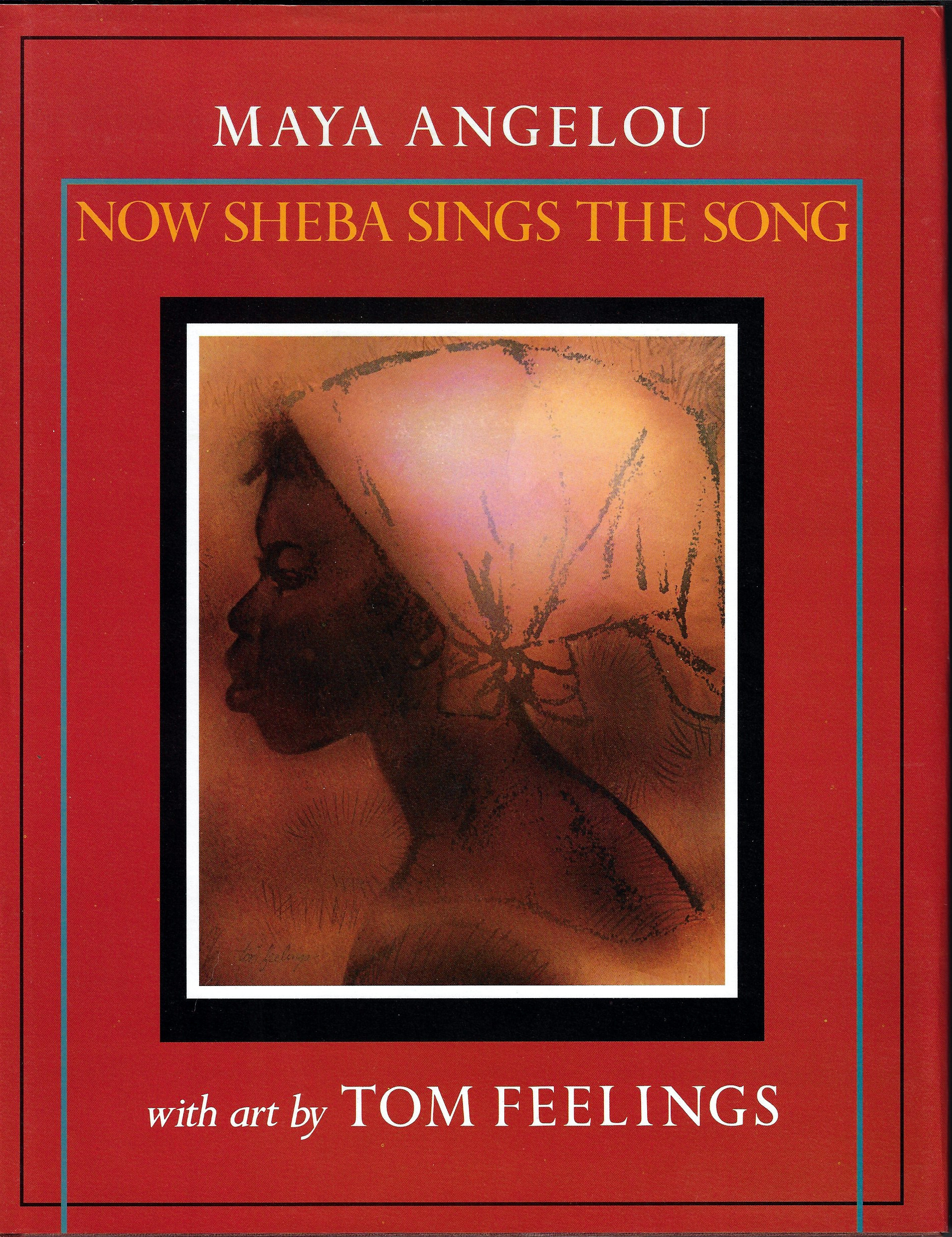
- Author: Maya Angelou
- Language: English
- Published: 1987

Now Sheba Sings the Song is a book of poems by Maya Angelou, published in 1987.
