= Great Food, All Day Long =

2010 cookbook by Maya Angelou

Great Food, All Day Long: Cook Splendidly, Eat Smart
- Cover of Great Food, All Day Long
- Author: Maya Angelou
- Language: English
- Genre: Culinary arts, essays
- Publisher: Random House
- Publication date: 2010
- Publication place: United States
- Media type: Print
- Pages: 218
- ISBN: 1-4000-6844-4
- Preceded by: Hallelujah! The Welcome Table: A Lifetime of Memories with Recipes

Great Food, All Day Long: Cook Splendidly, Eat Smart (2010) is Maya Angelou's second cookbook. A follow-up to Hallelujah! The Welcome Table (2004), Great Food, All Day Long similarly combines recipes and autobiographical sketches about how Angelou lost weight by eating smaller portions of satisfying meals. Her focus in this book is weight loss through portion control and flavor.
