= Hallelujah! The Welcome Table =

Book by Maya Angelou

Hallelujah! The Welcome Table: A Lifetime of Memories with Recipes
- Cover of Hallelujah! The Welcome Table
- Author: Maya Angelou
- Language: English
- Genre: Culinary Arts, Essays
- Publisher: Random House
- Publication date: 2004
- Publication place: United States
- Media type: Print
- Pages: 218
- ISBN: 1-4000-6289-6
- Followed by: Great Food, All Day Long: Cook Splendidly, Eat Smart

Hallelujah! The Welcome Table: A Lifetime of Memories with Recipes (2004) is author Maya Angelou's first cookbook. It pairs 28 essays written by Angelou with 73 recipes. Angelou got the title from an African-American spiritual. The book's audio version, which was produced at the same time as the print edition was published, was narrated by Angelou and included five cards created from recipes from the book.

== Background ==
Angelou learned to cook by observing her mother and grandmother. Her grandmother, Annie Henderson, who raised Angelou and her brother for most of their childhood, supported herself and her family during the early part of the 20th century and the Depression with food stalls catering for Black factory workers, which eventually developed into a store. Despite no previous experience, Angelou was a cook in a Creole restaurant when she was a 17-year-old single mother. She has called herself both a writer and a cook, which inspired The Welcome Table.

According to Angelou's biographer Marcia Ann Gillespie and her co-authors, Angelou's "skill in the kitchen is the stuff of legend—from haute cuisine to down-home comfort food". Angelou is known for her "good cooking and expansive hospitality". She also hosts several celebrations each year at her main residence in Winston-Salem, North Carolina, including Thanksgiving. She followed up The Welcome Table with a second cookbook, Great Food, All Day Long: Cook Splendidly, Eat Smart, published in 2010, which focused on weight loss through portion control and flavor.

== Composition ==
Welcome Table is dedicated "to every wannabe cook who will dare criticism by getting into the kitchen and stirring up some groceries", and well as to Angelou's friend Oprah Winfrey, "who said she wanted a big, pretty cookbook". Angelou adds: "Well, honey, here you are". Angelou, on her acknowledgement page, also thanks "all the great cooks whose food I have eaten and whose stories I have heard". She thanks those who helped her compile the recipes in the book, and her family, who sampled her food. She also thanked Brian Lanker, who photographed the dishes, and Brian Daigle, who drove her tour bus as she and her assistant, Lydia Stuckey, traveled the U.S.

The first half of Welcome Table is made up of Angelou's grandmother's and mother's recipes, along with anecdotes associated with them; the second half of the book includes "a dazzling array of international grownup tales, flavored with a collage of recipes joined together by association with Angelou". The Baltimore Sun states that Angelou "uses remembered meals and dishes as a prism through which to view her own life, its turning points and its intersections with the lives of others". The essays focus on events, paired with food, that occurred throughout Angelou's life, from her childhood in Stamps, Arkansas, to her adolescence and young adulthood spent with her mother Vivian Baxter, and to her career, which brought her fame. She impresses a prospective employer with Southern food; he tells her, "If you can write half as good as you can cook, you are going to be famous." As her fame grows, "the food world widens (tamales, pâté, minestrone, chachouka)" and her dining companions are also among the famous (Oprah Winfrey, Jessica Mitford, Rosa Guy). She serves what M. F. K. Fisher called "the first honest cassoulet I have eaten in years".

== Reception ==
The reviewer in Publishers Weekly characterises Welcome Table as a "collection of tear- and laughter-provoking vignettes". He also calls Angelou's food "delectable and comfortable", and states that her directions were simple but clear enough for experienced cooks. The Chicago Tribune, which re-created Angelou's recipes in their test kitchen, reports that their tasters gave the dishes high marks, but states that the instructions were not always clear for beginners. Angelou's caramel cake was considered delicious, but its frosting non-traditional.

== Works cited ==
- Angelou, Maya (2004). Hallelujah! The Welcome Table: A Lifetime of Memories with Recipes. New York: Random House. ISBN 1-4000-6289-6
- Gillespie, Marcia Ann, Rosa Johnson Butler, and Richard A. Long. (2008). Maya Angelou: A Glorious Celebration. New York: Random House. ISBN 978-0-385-51108-7
