= Just Give Me a Cool Drink of Water 'fore I Diiie =

Book by Maya Angelou

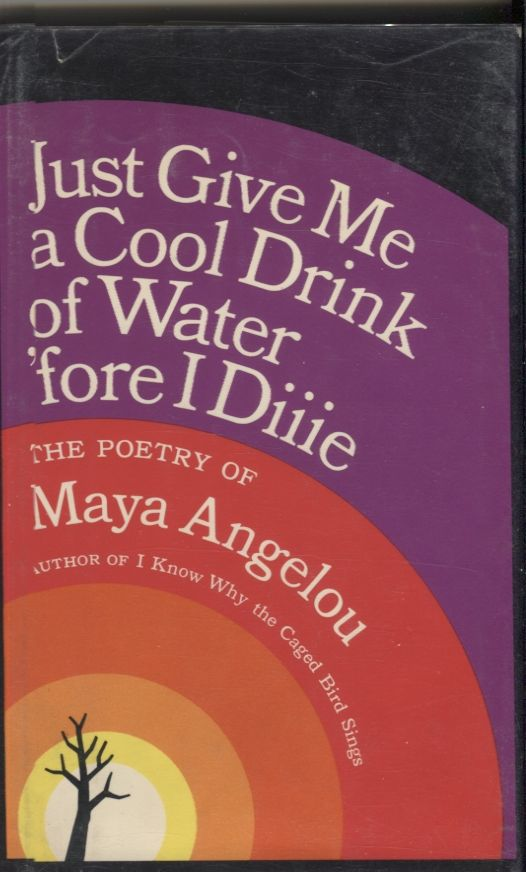
- Cover of Just Give Me a Cool Drink of Water 'fore I Diiie
- Author: Maya Angelou
- Language: English
- Genre: Poetry
- Publisher: Random House, Inc.
- Publication date: August 12, 1971 (1st edition)
- Publication place: United States
- Media type: Print (hardcover & paperback)
- Pages: 48 pp (hardcover 1st edition)
- ISBN: 978-0-394-47142-6 (hardcover 1st edition)
- OCLC: 160599
- Dewey Decimal: 811
- Followed by: Oh Pray My Wings Are Gonna Fit Me Well

Just Give Me a Cool Drink of Water 'fore I Diiie (1971) is the first collection of poems by African-American writer and poet Maya Angelou. Many of the poems in Diiie were originally song lyrics, written during Angelou's career as a night club performer, and recorded on two albums before the publication of Angelou's first autobiography I Know Why the Caged Bird Sings (1969). Angelou considered herself a poet and a playwright, but is best known for her seven autobiographies. Early in her writing career she began a practice of alternating the publication of an autobiography and a volume of poetry. Although her poetry collections have been best-sellers, they have not received serious critical attention and are more interesting when read aloud.

Diiie is made up of two sections of 38 poems. The 20 poems in the first section, "Where Love is a Scream of Anguish", center on love. Many of the poems in this section and the next are structured like blues and jazz music, and have universal themes of love and loss. The eighteen poems in the second section, "Just Before the World Ends", focus on the experience of the survival of African Americans despite living in a society dominated by whites.

Angelou uses the vernacular of African Americans, irony, understatement, and humor to make her statements about race and racism in America. She acts as a spokesperson for her race in these poems, in which her use of irony and humor allows her to speak for the collective and to assume a distance in order to make comments about her themes, topics, and subjects. Critic Kathy M. Essick have called the poems in Diiie "protest poems". The metaphors in her poetry serve as "coding", or litotes, for meanings understood by other Blacks, although her themes and topics are universal for most readers to understand.

Just Give Me a Cool Drink of Water 'fore I Diiie has received mixed reviews from critics but was a best-seller. Many critics expected that the volume would be popular despite their negative reviews, but others considered it well written, lyrical, and a moving expression of social observation.

== Background ==
Just Give Me a Cool Drink of Water 'fore I Diiie is Maya Angelou's first volume of poetry. She studied and began writing poetry at a young age. After her rape at the age of eight, as recounted in her first autobiography I Know Why the Caged Bird Sings, she dealt with her trauma by memorizing and reciting great works of literature, including poetry, which helped bring her out of her self-imposed muteness.

Angelou recorded two albums of poetry and songs she wrote during her career as a night club performer; the first in 1957 for Liberty Records and the second The Poetry of Maya Angelou, for GWP Records the year before the publication of her first autobiography I Know Why the Caged Bird Sings (1969). They were later incorporated into her volumes of poetry, including Diiie, which was published the year after Caged Bird became a best-seller. Diiie also became a best-seller, and was nominated for a Pulitzer Prize. Despite thinking of herself a playwright and poet when her editor Robert Loomis challenged her to write Caged Bird, she has been best known for her autobiographies. Many of Angelou's readers identify her as a poet first and an autobiographer second, yet like Lynn Z. Bloom, many critics consider her autobiographies more important than her poetry. Critic William Sylvester agrees, and states that although her books have been best-sellers, her poetry has not been perceived as seriously her prose. Bloom also believes that Angelou's poetry is more interesting when she recites them. Bloom considers her performances dynamic, and says that Angelou "moves exuberantly, vigorously to reinforce the rhythms of the lines, the tone of the words. Her singing and dancing and electrifying stage presence transcend the predictable words and phrases".

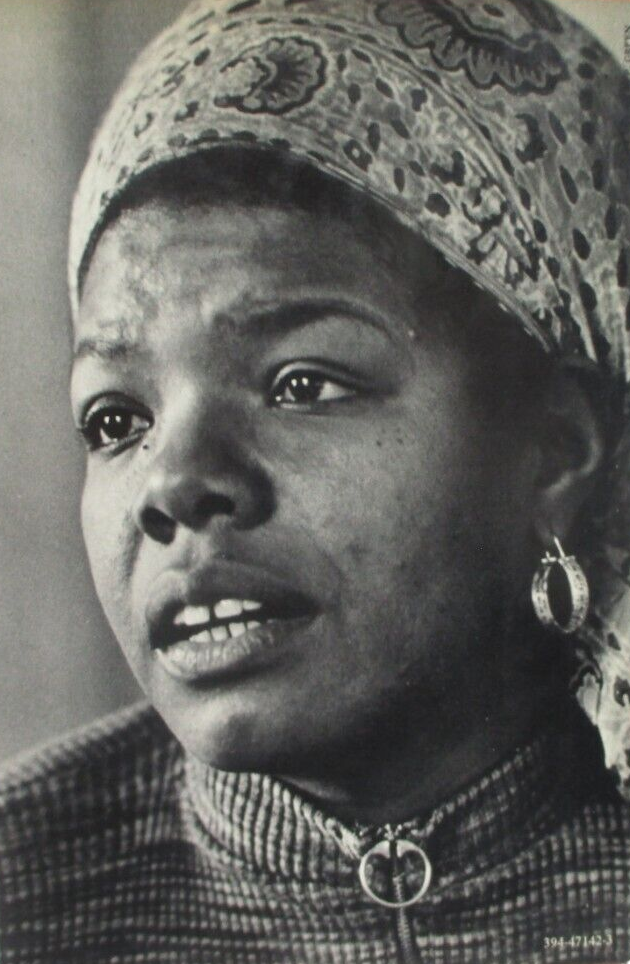
Portrait of Angelou from the first edition of Diiie

Early in her writing career, Angelou began alternating the publication of an autobiography and a volume of poetry. Her publisher, Random House, placed the poems in Diiie, along with her next four volumes, in her first collection of poetry, The Complete Collected Poems of Maya Angelou (1994), perhaps to capitalize on her popularity following her reading of her poem "On the Pulse of Morning" at President Bill Clinton's inauguration in 1993. A year later, in 1995, Angelou's publisher placed four more poems in a smaller volume, entitled Phenomenal Woman.

=== Title ===
Angelou chose "Just Give Me a Cool Drink of Water 'fore I Diiie" as the volume's title because of her interest in unconscious innocence, which she says is "even lovelier than trying to remain innocent." The title is a reference to her belief that "we as individuals ... are still so innocent that we think if we asked our murderer just before he puts the final wrench upon the throat, 'Would you please give me a cool drink of water?' and he would do so'". Angelou has said that if she "didn't believe that, [she] wouldn't get up in the morning".

== Themes ==
Angelou uses rhyme and repetition throughout all her works, yet rhyme is only found in seven of the poems in Just Give Me a Cool Drink of Water 'fore I Diiie; critic Lyman B. Hagen calls her use of rhythm "rather ordinary and unimaginative". Death is an important theme throughout many of Angelou's works, especially in Caged Bird, which opens with it and, according to scholar Liliane K. Arensberg, is resolved at the book's end, when her son is born. Death is directly mentioned in 19 of the 38 poems in Diiie. According to scholar Yasmin Y. DeGout, many of the poems in Diiie, along with those in Angelou's second volume Oh Pray My Wings Are Gonna Fit Me Well, "lack the overt empowerment themes of her later, better known works", especially And Still I Rise (1978) and I Shall Not Be Moved (1990).

=== Part One: Where Love is a Scream of Anguish ===
The themes in the first section of Just Give Me a Cool Drink of Water 'fore I Diiie focus on love. In Southern Women Writers, Carol Neubauer states that the first twenty poems in the volume "describe the whole gamut of love, from the first moment of passionate discovery to the first suspicion of painful loss". Kirkus Reviews finds more truth in the poems in this section, which describe love from the perspective of a Black woman, compared to those in the second section. Hagen feels that Angelou's best love poem in Diiie is "The Mothering Blackness", which uses repetition and biblical allusions to state that the Black mother loves and forgives her children unconditionally.

In "To a Husband", Angelou praises the Black slaves who helped in the development and growth of America. She idealizes Black men, especially in "A Zorro Man" and "To a Man"; she dedicates Diiie to the subjects of both poems. DeGout views "A Zorro Man" as an example of Angelou's ability to translate her personal experience into political discourse and the "textured liberation" she places in all her poetry. The use of concrete imagery and abstract symbolism to describe emotional and sexual experience, but also has another meaning, that of liberation from painful and poignant memories. According to DeGout, "A Zorro Man" lacks the clear themes of liberation that Angelou's later poems such as "Phenomenal Woman" have, but its subtle use of themes and techniques infer the liberation theme and compliment her poems that are more overtly liberating. The poem and others in Diiie, with its focus on women's sexual and romantic experiences, challenges the gender codes of poetry written in previous eras. She also challenges the male-centered and militaristic themes and messages found in the poetry of the Black Arts movement of the late 1960s and early 1970s. Angelou's use of sexual imagery, from a woman's point of view, provides new interpretations" and excavates it from derogatory assessments". Although the poem's speaker feels trapped, women's sexuality is depicted as powerful and controls her partner, which moves away from "the patriarchal assumption of male control over the sexual act". Angelou's depiction allows her readers, mostly women, to identify, celebrate, and universalize their sexuality to all races. DeGout states that "A Zorro Man" "enact[s] empowerment by liberating the reader from stigmas placed on women's sexuality from gender assumptions of male (sexual) power, and from racialized notions of women's experience".

Librarian John Alfred Avant states that many of Angelou's poems could be set to music like that of jazz singer and musician Nina Simone, especially the first poem in this section, "They Went Home," which he says "fits into the torchy unrequited love bag". Hagen considers Angelou's best poems to be the ones meant to be song lyrics, such as "They Went Home". In his analysis of "They Went Home", Hagen calls Angelou a realist because she recognizes that the married man who dates other women usually returns to his wife. He states, "While the sentiment is psychologically sound, the lines are prosaic, reflecting the pitiful state of the abandoned". Essick, when analyzing "When I Think About Myself", states that the poem central theme is "one's self-exultation and self-pride that prevent one from losing her will in spite of experiences involving pain and degradation".

According to Hagen, in his analysis of "No Loser, No Weeper", the speaker expresses the common experience of loss, beginning with childish and minor ones such as losing a dime, a doll, and a watch, and ending with the loss of the speaker's boyfriend. Kirkus Reviews considers this poem, along with "They Went Home", both slight and carrying "the weight of experience".

=== Part Two: Just Before the World Ends ===
The poems in the second section of Diiie are more militant in tone; according to critic Lyman B. Hagen, the poems in this section have "more bite" and express the experience of being Black in a white-dominated world. He states that Angelou acts as a spokesperson, especially in "To a Freedom Fighter", when she acknowledges a debt owed to those involved in the civil rights movement. According to Bloom, the themes in Angelou's poetry, which tend to be made up of short lyrics with strong, jazz-like rhythms, are common in the lives of many American Blacks. Angelou's poems commend the survivors who have prevailed despite racism and a great deal of difficulty and challenges. Neubauer states that Angelou focuses on the lives of American Black people from the time of slavery to the 1960s, and that her themes "deal broadly with the painful anguish suffered by blacks forced into submission, with guilt over accepting too much, and with protest and basic survival".

Critic William Sylvester states that the metaphors in Angelou's poetry serve as "coding", or litotes, for meanings understood by other Blacks. In her poem "Sepia Fashion Show", for example, the last lines ("I'd remind them please, look at those knees / you got a Miss Ann's scrubbing") is a reference to slavery, when Black women had to show their knees to prove how hard they had cleaned. Sylvester states that this is true in much of Angelou's poetry, and that it elicits a change in the reader's emotions; in this poem, from humor to anger. Sylvester says that Angelou uses the same technique in "Letter to an Aspiring Junkie", in which understatement contained in the repeated phrase "nothing happens" is a litotes for the prevalence of violence in society. Hagen connects this poem with the final scene in her second autobiography, Gather Together in My Name, which describes her encounter with her friend, a drug addict who shows her the effects of his drug habit. According to Hagen, the poem is full of disturbing images, such as drugs being a slave master and the junkie being tied to his habit like a monkey attached to the street vendor's strap.

Hagen calls Angelou's coding "signifying" and states, "A knowledge of black linguistic regionalisms and folklore enhances the appreciation of Angelou's poems". Line six in "Harlem Hopscotch," for example ("If you're white, all right / If you're brown, hang around / If you're black stand back"), is a popular jingle used by African Americans that people of other cultures might not recognize. Hagen believes that despite the signifying that occurs in many of Angelou's poems, the themes and topics are universal enough that all readers would understand and appreciate them.

In "When I Think About Myself", Angelou presents the perspective of an aging maid to make an ironic statement about Blacks surviving in a world dominated by whites, and in "Times-Square-Shoeshine-Competition", a Black shoeshine boy defends his prices to a white customer, his words punctuated by the "pow pow" of his shoeshine rag. Her poems, such as "Letter to an Aspiring Junkie", in this and other volumes deal with universal social problems from a Black perspective. African-American literature professor Priscilla R. Ramsey, when analyzing the poem "When I Think About Myself," states that the first-person singular pronoun "I", which Angelou uses often, is a symbol that refers to all her people. Ramsey calls this "a self-defining function", in which Angelou ironically views the world as an outsider, resulting in the loss of her direct and literal relationship to the world and providing her with the ability to "laugh at its characteristics no matter how politically and socially devastating". Scholar Kathy M. Essick discusses the same poem, calling it and most of the poems in Diiie, Angelou's "protest poems".

According to critic Harold Bloom, in his analysis of "Times-Square", the first line of the fourth stanza ("I ain't playing dozens mister") is an allusion to the Dozens, a game in which the participants insult each other. The game is mentioned in later poems, "The Thirteens (Black)" and "The Thirteens (White)." According to critic Geneva Smitherman, Angelou uses the Thirteens, a twist on the Dozens, to compare the insults of blacks and whites, which allows her to compare the actions of the two races. Bloom compares "Times-Square" to Langston Hughes' blues/protest poetry. He suggests that the best way to analyze the subjects, style, themes, and use of vernacular in this and most of Angelou's poems is to use "a blues-based model", since like the blues singer, Angelou uses laughter or ridicule instead of tears to cope with minor irritations, sadness, and great suffering. Hagen compares the themes in "The Thirteens (Black and White)" with Angelou's poems "Communication I" and "Communication II", which appear in Oh Pray My Wings Are Gonna Fit Me Well, her second volume of poetry.

Neubauer analyzes two poems in Diiie, "Times-Squares" and "Harlem Hopscotch", that support her assertion that for Angelou, "conditions must improve for the black race" She states, "Both [poems] ring with a lively, invincible beat that carries defeated figures into at least momentary triumph". In "Times-Squares", the shoeshiner claims to be the best at his trade and retains his pride despite his humiliating circumstances. "Harlem Hopscotch" celebrates survival and the strength, resilience, and energy necessary to accomplish it. Its rhythm echoes the beat of the player, and compares life to a brutal match. By the end of the poem, however, the speaker wins, both the game and in life. Neubauer states, "These poems are the poet's own defense against the incredible odds in the game of life".

Essick also analyzes "Times-Square", stating that the language and rhythm used by the poem's subject, especially the repetitive onomatopoeia ("pow pow") that punctuates the end of each line, parallels the sound of his work. The shoeshiner relies on the rhythm and repetition of his song to maintain his pace and to relieve his boredom. It also provides a way to help him brag about his abilities and talents. The shoeshiner takes on the role of the trickster, a common character in Black folklore, and demonstrates his control of vernacular language, especially when he refers to the Dozens.

== Critical response ==
Just Give Me a Cool Drink of Water 'fore I Diiie was a best-seller and was nominated for a Pulitzer Prize. The poems in the volume have received mixed reviews. Critic John Alfred Avant recognized that the volume would be popular due to the success of Caged Bird, but he characterized it as "rather well done schlock poetry, not to be confused with poetry for people who read poetry" and stated, "This collection isn't accomplished, not by any means; but some readers are going to love it." Martha Liddy, who reviewed the collection in the same issue of the Library Journal in 1971, classified it, like Caged Bird, in the young adult category and called Diiie a "volume of marvelously lyrical, rhythmical poems". Kirkus Reviews also found the poems in the volume unsophisticated yet sensitive to the spoken aspects of poetry, such as rhythm and diction, and considered her prose more poetic and unrestrained than her poetry.

A reviewer from Choice called the poems in Diiie "craftsmanlike and powerful though not great poetry", and recommended it for libraries with a collection of African-American literature. Critic William Sylvester, who says that Angelou "has an uncanny ability to capture the sound of a voice on a page", places her poems, especially the ones in this volume, in the "background of black rhythms". Chad Walsh, reviewing Diiie in Book World, calls Angelou's poems "a moving blend of lyricism and harsh social observation".

== Poems ==
Of the 38 poems in Just Give Me a Cool Drink of Water 'fore I Diiie, twenty are in the first part, "Where Love is a Scream of Anguish," and the remaining eighteen are in the second part, "Just Before the World Ends." The volume is dedicated "to Amber Sam and the Zorro Man," a reference to the poems "A Zorro Man" and "To a Man," both of which are in the first part of the book. According to Liddy, "Part One contains poetry of love, and therefore of anguish, sharing, fear, affection and loneliness. Part Two features poetry of racial confrontation—of protest, anger, and irony". Most of the poems are short in length and are freeform.

Part One: Where Love is a Scream of Anguish

- "They Went Home"
- "The Gamut"
- "A Zorro Man"
- "To a Man"
- "Late October"
- "No Loser, No Weeper"
- "When You Come to Me"
- "Remembering"
- "In a Time"
- "Tears"
- "The Detached"
- "To a Husband"
- "Accident"
- "Let's Majeste"
- "After"
- "The Mothering Blackness"
- "On Diverse Deviations"
- "Mourning Grace"
- "How I Can Lie to You"
- "Sounds Like Pearls"

Part Two: Just Before the World Ends

- "When I Think About Myself"
- "On a Bright Day, Next Week"
- "Letter to an Aspiring Junkie"
- "Miss Scarlett, Mr. Rhett and Other Latter-Day Saints"
- "Times-Square-Shoeshine-Composition"
- "Faces"
- "To a Freedom Fighter"
- "Riot: 60's"
- "We Saw Beyond Our Seeming"
- "Black Ode"
- "No No No No"
- "My Guilt"
- "The Calling of Names"
- "On Working White Liberals"
- "Sepia Fashion Show"
- "The Thirteens (Black)"
- "The Thirteens (White)"
- "Harlem Hopscotch"
