= Maya Angelou =

American writer and activist (1928–2014)

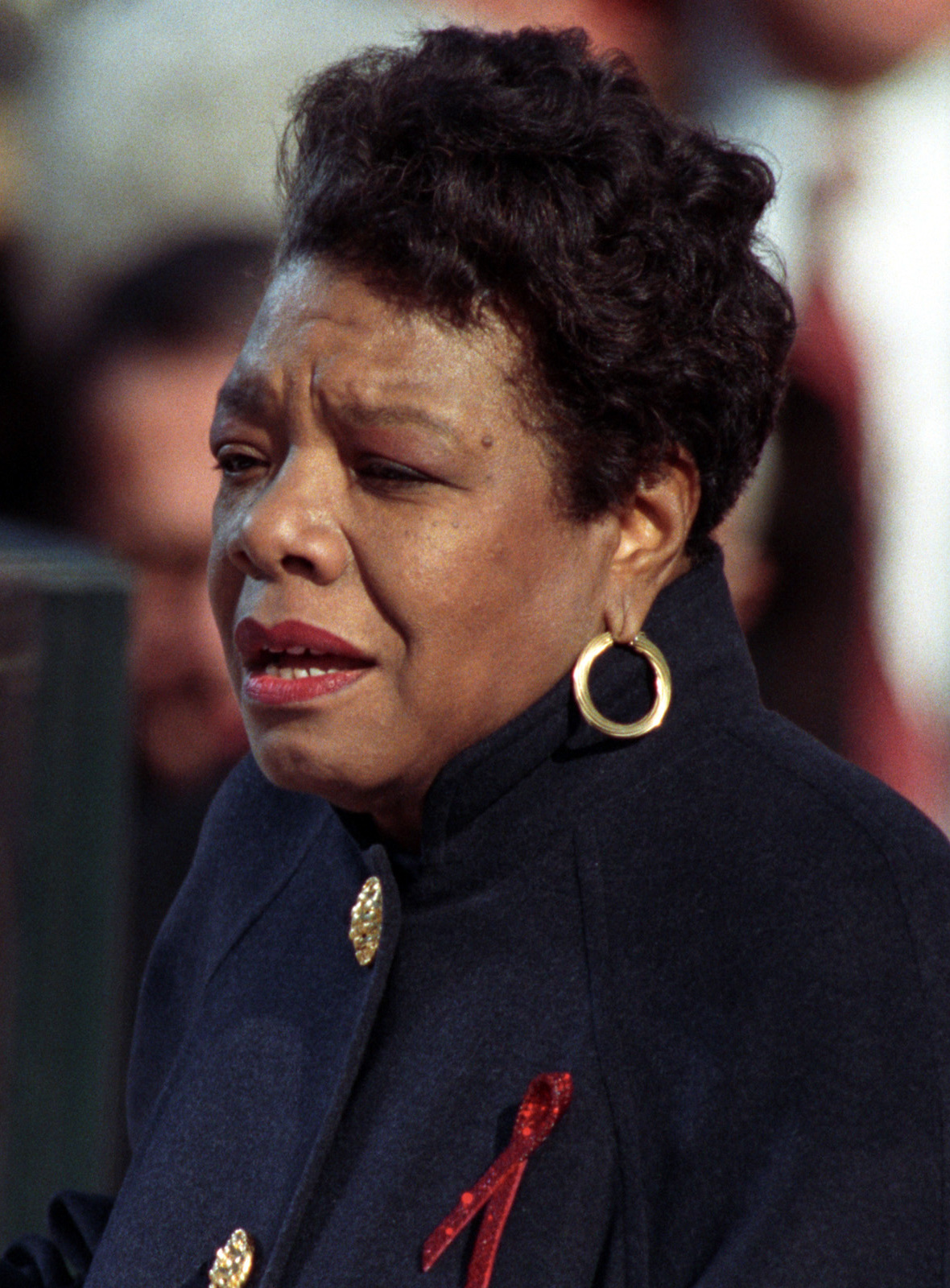
- Angelou in 1993
- Born: Marguerite Annie Johnson; April 4, 1928; St. Louis, Missouri, U.S.
- Died: May 28, 2014 (aged 86); Winston-Salem, North Carolina, U.S.
- Occupations: Writer; poet; civil rights activist
- Spouses: Tosh Angelos (m. 1951; div. 1954) Paul du Feu (m. 1974; div. 1983)
- Children: 1
- Writing career
- Period: 1951–2014
- Subjects: Memoir; poetry
- Works: List of works
- Website: www.mayaangelou.com

Maya Angelou (/ˈændʒəloʊ/ AN-jə-loh; born Marguerite Annie Johnson; April 4, 1928 – May 28, 2014) was an American memoirist, essayist, poet, and civil rights activist. She published seven autobiographies, three books of essays, several books of poetry, and is credited with a list of plays, movies, and television shows spanning more than 50 years. She received dozens of awards and more than 50 honorary degrees. Angelou's series of seven autobiographies focus on her childhood and early adult experiences. The first, I Know Why the Caged Bird Sings (1969), tells of her life up to the age of 17 and brought her international recognition and acclaim.

She became a poet and writer after a string of odd jobs during her young adulthood. In 1982, Angelou was named the first Reynolds Professor of American Studies at Wake Forest University in Winston-Salem, North Carolina. Angelou was active in the civil rights movement and worked with Martin Luther King Jr. and Malcolm X. Beginning in the 1990s, she made approximately 80 appearances a year on the lecture circuit, something she continued into her eighties. In 1993, Angelou recited her poem "On the Pulse of Morning" (1993) at the first inauguration of Bill Clinton, making her the first poet to make an inaugural recitation since Robert Frost at the inauguration of John F. Kennedy in 1961.

With the publication of I Know Why the Caged Bird Sings, Angelou publicly discussed aspects of her personal life. She was respected as a spokesperson for African Americans and women, and her works have been considered a defense of African-American culture. Her works are widely used in schools and universities worldwide, although attempts have been made to ban her books from some U.S. libraries. Angelou's most celebrated works have been labeled as autobiographical fiction, but many critics consider them to be autobiographies. She made a deliberate attempt to challenge the common structure of the autobiography by critiquing, changing, and expanding the genre. Her books center on themes that include racism, identity, family, and travel.

== Early life ==
Maya Angelou was born Marguerite Annie Johnson on April 4, 1928, in St. Louis, Missouri, the younger of two children of Bailey Johnson, a doorman and navy dietitian, and Vivian (née Baxter) Johnson, a nurse and card dealer. (Note: Angelou wrote about Vivian Baxter's life and their relationship in Mom & Me & Mom (2013), her final installment in her series of seven autobiographies.) For the first three years of her life, her family lived in her maternal grandparents' home. Angelou's older brother, Bailey Jr., nicknamed Marguerite "Maya", derived from "My" or "Mya Sister". When Angelou was three and her brother four, their parents' "calamitous marriage" ended, and their father sent them to Stamps, Arkansas, alone by train, to live with their paternal grandmother, Annie Henderson. In "an astonishing exception" to the harsh economics of African Americans of the time, Angelou's grandmother prospered financially during the Great Depression and World War II, because the general store she owned sold basic and needed commodities and because "she made wise and honest investments". (Note: According to Angelou, Annie Henderson built her business with food stalls catering to Black workers, which eventually developed into a store.)

Four years later, when Angelou was seven and her brother eight, the children's father "came to Stamps without warning" and returned them to their mother's care in St. Louis. At the age of eight, while living with her mother, Angelou was sexually abused and raped by her mother's boyfriend, a man named Freeman. She told her brother, who told the rest of their family. Freeman was found guilty but was jailed for only one day. Four days after his release, he was murdered, probably by Angelou's uncles. Angelou became mute for almost five years, believing she was to blame for his death; as she stated: "I thought, my voice killed him; I killed that man, because I told his name. And then I thought I would never speak again, because my voice would kill anyone." According to Marcia Ann Gillespie and her colleagues, who wrote a biography about Angelou, it was during this period of silence when Angelou developed her extraordinary memory, her love for books and literature, and her ability to listen and observe the world around her.

To know her life story is to simultaneously wonder what on earth you have been doing with your own life and feel glad that you didn't have to go through half the things she has.

— The Guardian writer Gary Younge, 2009

Shortly after Freeman's murder, when Angelou was eight and her brother nine, Angelou and her brother were sent back to their grandmother. She attended the Lafayette County Training School, in Stamps, a Rosenwald School. Angelou credits a teacher and friend of her family, Mrs. Beulah Flowers, with helping her speak again, challenging her by saying: "You do not love poetry, not until you speak it." Flowers introduced her to Charles Dickens, William Shakespeare, Edgar Allan Poe, Georgia Douglas Johnson, and James Weldon Johnson, authors who would affect Angelou's life and career, as well as Black female artists such as Frances Harper, Anne Spencer, and Jessie Fauset.

When Angelou was 14 and her brother 15, she and her brother moved in once again with their mother, who had since moved to Oakland, California. During World War II, Angelou attended the California Labor School. At the age of 16, she became the first Black female streetcar conductor in San Francisco. She wanted the job badly, admiring the uniforms of the operators, describing the women in uniform as having "their little money-changing belts and with bibs on their caps and well-fitted uniforms"—so much so that her mother referred to it as her "dream job". Her mother encouraged her to pursue the position, but warned her that she would need to arrive early and work harder than others. In 2014, Angelou received a lifetime achievement award from the Conference of Minority Transportation Officials as part of a session billed "Women Who Move the Nation".

Three weeks after completing school, at the age of 17, she gave birth to her son, Clyde (who later changed his name to Guy Johnson).

== Career ==
=== Adulthood and early career: 1951–1961 ===
In 1951, Angelou married Tosh Angelos, a Greek electrician, former sailor, and aspiring musician, despite the condemnation of interracial relationships at the time and the disapproval of her mother. (Note: The correct Greek spelling of Angelou's husband name is probably "Anastasios Angelopoulos".) She took modern dance classes during this time and met dancers and choreographers Alvin Ailey and Ruth Beckford. Ailey and Angelou formed a dance team, calling themselves "Al and Rita", and performed modern dance at fraternal Black organizations throughout San Francisco but never became successful. Angelou, her new husband, and her son moved to New York City so she could study African dance with Trinidadian dancer Pearl Primus, but they returned to San Francisco a year later.

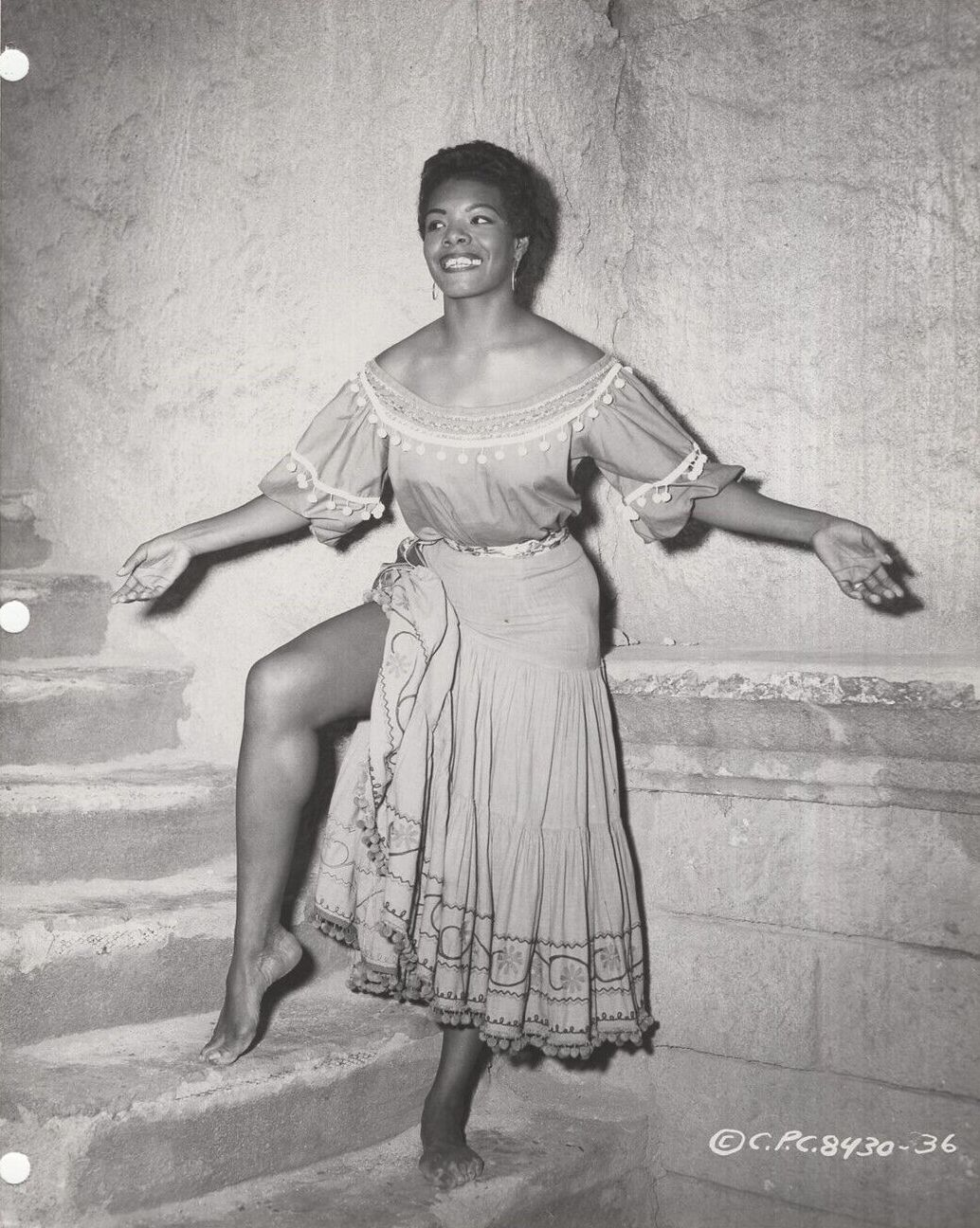
Publicity photo for Calypso Heat Wave, 1957

After Angelou's marriage ended in 1954, she danced professionally in clubs around San Francisco, including the nightclub The Purple Onion, where she sang and danced to calypso music. Up to that point, she went by the name of "Marguerite Johnson", or "Rita", but at the strong suggestion of her managers and supporters at The Purple Onion, she changed her professional name to "Maya Angelou" (her nickname and former married surname). It was a "distinctive name" that set her apart and captured the feel of her calypso dance performances. During 1954 and 1955, Angelou toured Europe with a production of the opera Porgy and Bess. She began her practice of learning the language of every country she visited, and in a few years she gained proficiency in several languages. In 1957, riding on the popularity of calypso, Angelou recorded her first album, Miss Calypso, which was reissued as a CD in 1996. She appeared in an off-Broadway review that inspired the 1957 film Calypso Heat Wave, in which Angelou sang and performed her own compositions. (Note: Reviewer John M. Miller calls Angelou's performance of her song "All That Happens in the Marketplace" the "most genuine musical moment in the film".) (Note: In Angelou's third book of essays, Letter to My Daughter (2009), she credits Cuban artist Celia Cruz as one of the greatest influences of her singing career, and later, credits Cruz for the effectiveness and impact of Angelou's poetry performances and readings.)

In 1959, Angelou met novelist John Oliver Killens and, at his urging, moved to New York to concentrate on her writing career. She joined the Harlem Writers Guild, where she met several major African American authors, including John Henrik Clarke, Rosa Guy, Paule Marshall, and Julian Mayfield, and was published for the first time. In 1960, after meeting civil rights leader Martin Luther King Jr. and hearing him speak, she and Killens organized "the legendary" Cabaret for Freedom to benefit the Southern Christian Leadership Conference (SCLC), and she was named SCLC's Northern Coordinator. According to scholar Lyman B. Hagen, her contributions to civil rights as a fundraiser and SCLC organizer were successful and "eminently effective". Angelou also began her pro-Castro and anti-apartheid activism during this time, joining the Fair Play for Cuba Committee. She had joined the crowd cheering for Fidel Castro when he first entered the Hotel Theresa in Harlem, New York, during the United Nations 15th General Assembly on September 19, 1960.

=== Africa to Caged Bird: 1961–1969 ===
In 1961, Angelou performed in Jean Genet's play The Blacks (playing the part of the Queen), along with Abbey Lincoln, Roscoe Lee Browne, James Earl Jones, Louis Gossett, Godfrey Cambridge, and Cicely Tyson. Also in 1961, she met South African freedom fighter Vusumzi Make; they never officially married. She and her son Guy moved with Make to Cairo, where Angelou worked as an associate editor at the weekly English-language newspaper The Arab Observer. In 1962, her relationship with Make ended, and she and Guy moved to Accra, Ghana, so he could attend college, but he was seriously injured in an automobile accident. (Note: Guy Johnson, who as a result of this accident in Accra and one in the late 1960s, underwent a series of spinal surgeries. He, like his mother, became a writer and poet.) Angelou remained in Accra for his recovery and ended up staying there until 1965. She became an administrator at the University of Ghana and was active in the African American expatriate community. She was a feature editor for The African Review, a freelance writer for the Ghanaian Times, wrote and broadcast for Radio Ghana, and worked and performed for Ghana's National Theatre. She performed in a revival of The Blacks in Geneva and Berlin.

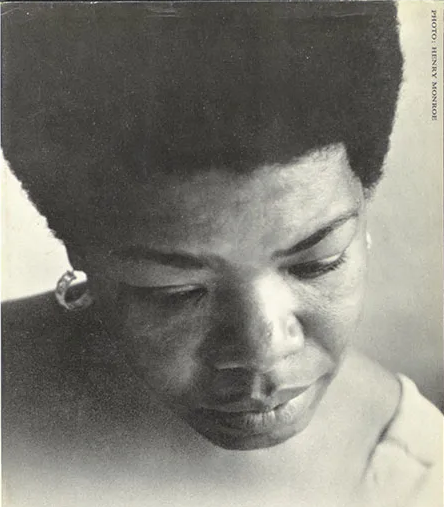
Portrait from the first edition of I Know Why the Caged Bird Sings (1969)

In Accra, she became close friends with Malcolm X during his visit in the early 1960s. (Note: Angelou called her friendship with Malcolm X "a brother/sister relationship".) Angelou returned to the U.S. in 1965 to help him build a new civil rights organization, the Organization of Afro-American Unity; he was assassinated shortly afterward. Devastated and adrift, she joined her brother in Hawaii, where she resumed her singing career. She moved back to Los Angeles to focus on her writing career. Working as a market researcher in Watts, Angelou witnessed the riots in the summer of 1965. She acted in and wrote plays and returned to New York in 1967. She met her lifelong friend Rosa Guy and renewed her friendship with James Baldwin, whom she had met in Paris in the 1950s and called "my brother", during this time. Her friend Jerry Purcell provided Angelou with a stipend to support her writing.

In 1968, Martin Luther King Jr. asked Angelou to organize a march. She agreed, but postponed once again, and in what Gillespie calls "a macabre twist of fate", he was assassinated on her 40th birthday (April 4). (Note: Angelou did not celebrate her birthday for many years, choosing instead to send flowers to King's widow Coretta Scott King.) Devastated again, she was encouraged out of her depression by her friend James Baldwin. As Gillespie states, "If 1968 was a year of great pain, loss, and sadness, it was also the year when America first witnessed the breadth and depth of Maya Angelou's spirit and creative genius". Despite having almost no experience, she wrote, produced, and narrated Blacks, Blues, Black!, a ten-part series of documentaries about the connection between blues music and Black Americans' African heritage, and what Angelou called the "Africanisms still current in the U.S." for National Educational Television, the precursor of PBS. Also in 1968, inspired at a dinner party she attended with Baldwin, cartoonist Jules Feiffer, and his wife Judy, and challenged by Random House editor Robert Loomis, she wrote her first autobiography, I Know Why the Caged Bird Sings, published in 1969. This brought her international recognition and acclaim.

=== Later career ===
==== 1970s to 1980s: Writing and teaching ====
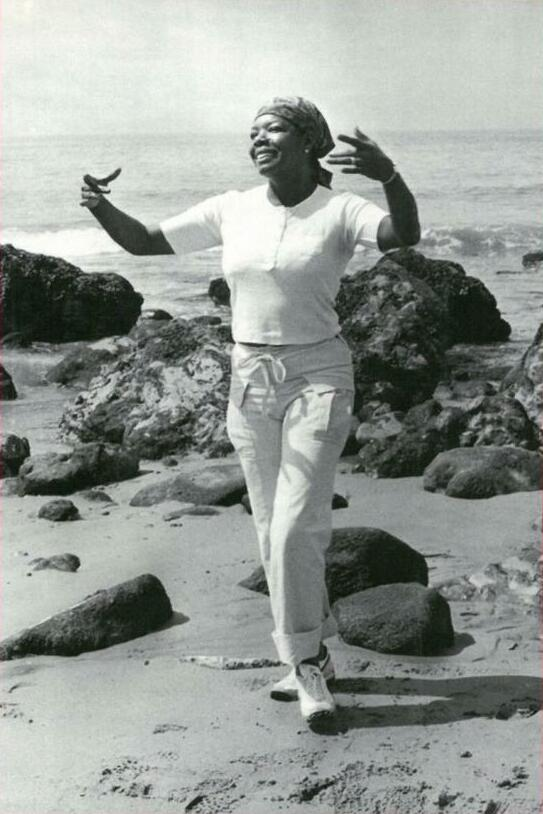
Portrait from the first edition of And Still I Rise (1978)

Released in 1972, Angelou's Georgia, Georgia, produced by a Swedish film company and filmed in Sweden, was the first produced screenplay by a Black woman. She also wrote the film's soundtrack, despite having very little additional input in the filming of the movie. (Note: See Mom & Me & Mom, pp. 168–178, for a description of Angelou's experience in Stockholm.) Angelou married Paul du Feu, a Welsh carpenter and ex-husband of writer Germaine Greer, in San Francisco in 1973. (Note: Angelou described their marriage, which she called "made in heaven", in her second book of essays Even the Stars Look Lonesome (1997).) Over the next ten years, as Gillespie has stated, "She [Angelou] had accomplished more than many artists hope to achieve in a lifetime." Angelou worked as a composer, writing for singer Roberta Flack, (Note: Angelou co-wrote "And So It Goes" on Flack's 1988 album Oasis.) and composing movie scores. She wrote articles, short stories, TV scripts, documentaries, autobiographies, and poetry. She produced plays and was named a visiting professor at several colleges and universities. She was "a reluctant actor", and was nominated for a Tony Award in 1973 for her role in Jerome Kilty's play Look Away. As a theater director, in 1988 she undertook a revival of Errol John's play Moon on a Rainbow Shawl at the Almeida Theatre in London.

In 1977, Angelou appeared in a supporting role in the television mini-series Roots. She was given multiple awards during this period, including more than thirty honorary degrees from colleges and universities from all over the world. In the late 1970s, Angelou met Oprah Winfrey when Winfrey was a TV anchor in Baltimore, Maryland; Angelou would later become Winfrey's close friend and mentor. (Note: Angelou dedicated her 1993 book of essays Wouldn't Take Nothing for My Journey Now to Winfrey.) In 1981, Angelou and du Feu divorced.

She returned to the southern United States in 1981 because she felt she had to come to terms with her past there and, despite having no bachelor's degree, accepted the lifetime Reynolds Professorship of American Studies at Wake Forest University in Winston-Salem, North Carolina, where she was one of a few full-time African American professors. From that point on, she considered herself "a teacher who writes". Angelou taught a variety of subjects that reflected her interests, including philosophy, ethics, theology, science, theater, and writing. The Winston-Salem Journal reported that even though she made many friends on campus, "she never quite lived down all of the criticism from people who thought she was more of a celebrity than an intellect ... [and] an overpaid figurehead". The last course she taught at Wake Forest was in 2011, but she was planning to teach another course in late 2014. Her final speaking engagement at the university was in late 2013. Beginning in the 1990s, Angelou actively participated in the lecture circuit in a customized tour bus, something she continued into her eighties. She also taught at the University of California, Los Angeles, the University of Kansas, and the University of Ghana and was recognized as a Rockefeller Foundation Scholar and a Yale University Fellow. She wrote the poetry and played a role in the 1993 movie Poetic Justice starring Janet Jackson.

==== 1990s onward ====
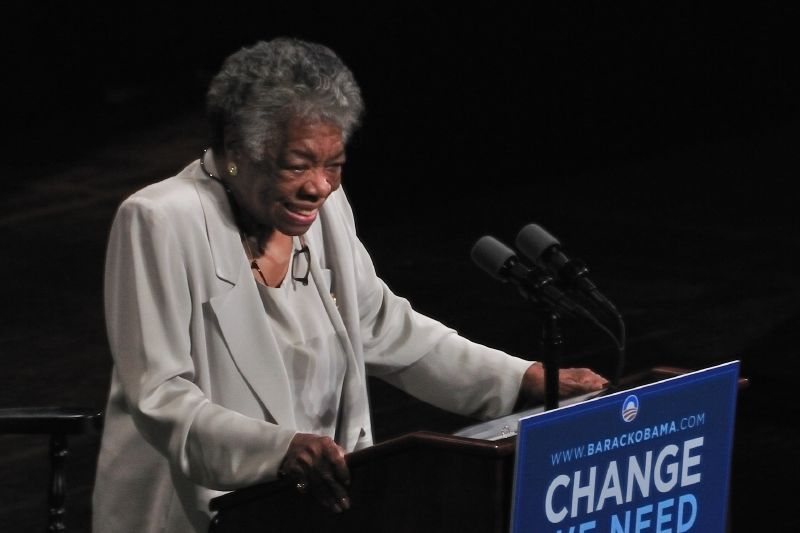
Angelou speaking at a rally for Barack Obama, 2008

In 1993, Angelou recited her poem "On the Pulse of Morning" at the presidential inauguration of Bill Clinton, becoming the first poet to make an inaugural recitation since Robert Frost at John F. Kennedy's inauguration in 1961. Her recitation resulted in more fame and recognition for her previous works, and broadened her appeal "across racial, economic, and educational boundaries". The recording of the poem won a Grammy Award. In June 1995, she delivered what Richard Long called her "second 'public' poem", entitled "A Brave and Startling Truth", which commemorated the 50th anniversary of the United Nations.

Angelou achieved her goal of directing a feature film in 1996, Down in the Delta, which featured actors such as Alfre Woodard and Wesley Snipes. Also in 1996, she collaborated with R&B artists Ashford & Simpson on seven of the eleven tracks of their album Been Found. The album was responsible for three of Angelou's only Billboard chart appearances. In 2000, she created a successful collection of products for Hallmark, including greeting cards and decorative household items. She responded to critics who charged her with being too commercial by stating that "the enterprise was perfectly in keeping with her role as 'the people's poet'". More than thirty years after Angelou began writing her life story, she completed her sixth autobiography A Song Flung Up to Heaven, in 2002.

Angelou campaigned for the Democratic Party in the 2008 presidential primaries, giving her public support to Hillary Clinton. In the run-up to the January Democratic primary in South Carolina, the Clinton campaign ran ads featuring Angelou's endorsement. The ads were part of the campaign's efforts to rally support in the Black community; but Barack Obama won the South Carolina primary, finishing 29 points ahead of Clinton and taking 80% of the Black vote. When Clinton's campaign ended, Angelou put her support behind Obama, who went on to win the presidential election and become the first African American president of the United States. After Obama's inauguration, she stated, "We are growing up beyond the idiocies of racism and sexism."

Angelou and Hillary Clinton at an event in North Carolina in 2008

In late 2010, Angelou donated her personal papers and career memorabilia to the Schomburg Center for Research in Black Culture in Harlem. They consisted of more than 340 boxes of documents that featured her handwritten notes on yellow legal pads for I Know Why the Caged Bird Sings, a 1982 telegram from Coretta Scott King, fan mail, and personal and professional correspondence from colleagues such as her editor Robert Loomis. In 2011, Angelou served as a consultant for the Martin Luther King, Jr. Memorial in Washington, D.C. She spoke out in opposition to a paraphrase of a quotation by King that appeared on the memorial, saying, "The quote makes Dr. Martin Luther King look like an arrogant twit", and demanded that it be changed. Eventually, the paraphrase was removed.

In 2013, at the age of 85, Angelou published the seventh volume of autobiography in her series, entitled Mom & Me & Mom, which focuses on her relationship with her mother.

== Personal life ==
I make writing as much a part of my life as I do eating or listening to music.

— Maya Angelou, 1999

I also wear a hat or a very tightly pulled head tie when I write. I suppose I hope by doing that I will keep my brains from seeping out of my scalp and running in great gray blobs down my neck, into my ears, and over my face.

— Maya Angelou, 1984

Nothing so frightens me as writing, but nothing so satisfies me. It's like a swimmer in the [English] Channel: you face the stingrays and waves and cold and grease, and finally you reach the other shore, and you put your foot on the ground—Aaaahhhh!

— Maya Angelou, 1989

Evidence suggests that Angelou was partially descended from the Mende people of West Africa through her maternal line. (Note: In her fifth autobiography All God's Children Need Traveling Shoes (1987), Angelou recounts being identified, on the basis of her appearance, as part of the Bambara people, a subset of the Mande.) In 2008, a DNA test revealed that 45 percent of her genetic makeup was from Central African peoples from Congo-Angola region and 55 percent came from West Africans. A 2008 PBS documentary found that Angelou's maternal great-grandmother, Mary Lee, who had been emancipated after the Civil War, became pregnant by her white former owner, John Savin. Savin forced Lee to sign a false statement accusing another man of being the father of her child. After Savin was indicted for forcing Lee to commit perjury, and despite the discovery that Savin was the father, a jury found him not guilty. Lee was sent to the Clinton County poorhouse in Missouri with her daughter, Marguerite Baxter, who became Angelou's grandmother. Angelou described Lee as "that poor little black girl, physically and mentally bruised." Her maternal grandfather, Thomas Baxter, was from Trinidad and Tobago. He jumped ship in Florida at the turn of the 20th century, and later moved north and became a railway porter in St. Louis.

The details of Angelou's life described in her seven autobiographies and in numerous interviews, speeches, and articles tended to be inconsistent. Critic Mary Jane Lupton has explained that when Angelou spoke about her life, she did so eloquently, but informally, and "with no time chart in front of her." For example, she was married at least twice, but never clarified the number of times she had been married, "for fear of sounding frivolous." According to her autobiographies and to Gillespie, she married Tosh Angelos in 1951, and Paul du Feu in 1973 or 1974, and began her relationship with Vusumzi Make in 1961, but never formally married him. Angelou held many jobs, including some in the sex trade working as a prostitute and madam for lesbians, and describes so in her second autobiography, Gather Together in My Name. In a 1995 interview, Angelou said:

I wrote about my experiences because I thought too many people tell young folks, "I never did anything wrong. Who, Moi? – never I. I have no skeletons in my closet. In fact, I have no closet." They lie like that and then young people find themselves in situations and they think, "Damn I must be a pretty bad guy. My mom or dad never did anything wrong." They can't forgive themselves and go on with their lives.

Angelou had one son, Guy, whose birth she described in her first autobiography; one grandson, two great-grandchildren, and, according to Gillespie, a large group of friends and extended family. (Note: See Gillespie et al., pp. 153–175.) Angelou's mother Vivian Baxter died in 1991 and her brother Bailey Johnson Jr. died in 2000 after a series of strokes; both were important figures in her life and her books. (Note: Angelou describes her brother's addiction to heroin in Mom & Me & Mom, pp. 189–194.) In 1981, the mother of her grandson disappeared with him; finding him took four years. (Note: In Angelou's essay, "My Grandson, Home at Last", published in Woman's Day in 1986, she describes the kidnapping and her response to it.)

Angelou did not earn a university degree, but according to Gillespie it was Angelou's preference to be called "Dr. Angelou" by people outside of her family and close friends. She owned two homes in Winston-Salem, North Carolina, and a "lordly brownstone" in Harlem, which was purchased in 2004 and was full of her "growing library" of books she collected throughout her life, artwork collected over the span of many decades, and well-stocked kitchens. The Guardian writer Gary Younge reported that in Angelou's Harlem home were several African wall hangings and her collection of paintings, including ones of several jazz trumpeters, a watercolor of Rosa Parks, and a Faith Ringgold work entitled "Maya's Quilt Of Life".

According to Gillespie, she hosted several celebrations per year at her main residence in Winston-Salem; "her skill in the kitchen is the stuff of legend—from haute cuisine to down-home comfort food". The Winston-Salem Journal stated: "Securing an invitation to one of Angelou's Thanksgiving dinners, Christmas tree decorating parties or birthday parties was among the most coveted invitations in town." The New York Times, describing Angelou's residence history in New York City, stated that she regularly hosted elaborate New Year's Day parties. She combined her cooking and writing skills in her 2004 book Hallelujah! The Welcome Table, which featured 73 recipes, many of which she learned from her grandmother and mother, accompanied by 28 vignettes. She followed up in 2010 with her second cookbook, Great Food, All Day Long: Cook Splendidly, Eat Smart, which focused on weight loss and portion control.

Beginning with I Know Why the Caged Bird Sings, Angelou used the same "writing ritual" for many years. She would wake early in the morning and check into a hotel room, where the staff was instructed to remove any pictures from the walls. She would write on legal pads while lying on the bed, with only a bottle of sherry, a deck of cards to play solitaire, Roget's Thesaurus, and the Bible, and would leave by the early afternoon. She would average 10–12 pages of written material a day, which she edited down to three or four pages in the evening. (Note: In Letter to My Daughter (2009), Angelou's third book of essays, she related the first time she used legal pads to write.) She went through this process to "enchant" herself, and as she said in a 1989 interview with the British Broadcasting Corporation, "relive the agony, the anguish, the Sturm und Drang". She placed herself back in the time she wrote about, even traumatic experiences such as her rape in Caged Bird, to "tell the human truth" about her life. She was quoted as saying: "The way I deal with any pain is to admit it – let it come." Angelou stated that she played cards to get to that place of enchantment and to access her memories more effectively. She said, "It may take an hour to get into it, but once I'm in it—ha! It's so delicious!" She did not find the process cathartic; rather, she found relief in "telling the truth".

In 2009, the gossip website TMZ erroneously reported that Angelou had been hospitalized in Los Angeles when she was alive and well in St. Louis, which resulted in rumors of her death and, according to Angelou, concern among her friends and family worldwide.

== Death ==
Angelou died on the morning of May 28, 2014, at age 86. Although Angelou had been in poor health and had canceled recent scheduled appearances, she was working on another book, an autobiography about her experiences with national and world leaders. During her memorial service at Wake Forest University, her son Guy Johnson stated that despite being in constant pain due to her dancing career and respiratory failure, she wrote four books during the last ten years of her life. He said, "She left this mortal plane with no loss of acuity and no loss in comprehension."

Tributes to Angelou and condolences were paid by artists, entertainers, and world leaders, including President Obama, whose sister was named after Angelou, and Bill Clinton. Harold Augenbraum, from the National Book Foundation, said that Angelou's "legacy is one that all writers and readers across the world can admire and aspire to." The week after Angelou's death, I Know Why the Caged Bird Sings rose to number 1 on Amazon.com's bestseller list.

On May 29, 2014, Mount Zion Baptist Church in Winston-Salem, of which Angelou was a member for 30 years, held a public memorial service to honor her. On June 7, a private memorial service was held at Wait Chapel on the campus of Wake Forest University in Winston-Salem. The memorial was shown live on local stations in the Winston-Salem/Triad area and streamed live on the university web site with speeches from her son, Oprah Winfrey, Michelle Obama, and Bill Clinton. On June 15, a memorial was held at Glide Memorial Church in San Francisco, where Angelou was a member for many years. Rev. Cecil Williams, Mayor Ed Lee, and former mayor Willie Brown spoke.

== Works ==
Angelou wrote a total of seven autobiographies. According to scholar Mary Jane Lupton, Angelou's third autobiography Singin' and Swingin' and Gettin' Merry Like Christmas marked the first time a well-known African American autobiographer had written a third volume about her life. Her books "stretch over time and place", from Arkansas to Africa and back to the U.S., and take place from the beginnings of World War II to the assassination of Martin Luther King Jr. In her fifth autobiography, All God's Children Need Traveling Shoes (1986), Angelou tells about her return to Ghana searching for the past of her tribe. She published her seventh autobiography Mom & Me & Mom in 2013, at the age of 85. Critics have tended to give Caged Bird the highest praise. Angelou wrote five collections of essays, which writer Hilton Als called her "wisdom books" and "homilies strung together with autobiographical texts". Angelou used the same editor throughout her writing career, Robert Loomis, an executive editor at Random House; he retired in 2011 and has been called "one of publishing's hall of fame editors". Angelou said regarding Loomis: "We have a relationship that's kind of famous among publishers."

All my work, my life, everything I do is about survival, not just bare, awful, plodding survival, but survival with grace and faith. While one may encounter many defeats, one must not be defeated.

— Maya Angelou

Angelou's long and extensive career also included poetry, plays, screenplays for television and film, directing, acting, and public speaking. She was a prolific writer of poetry; her volume Just Give Me a Cool Drink of Water 'fore I Diiie (1971) was nominated for the Pulitzer Prize, and she was chosen by U.S. president Bill Clinton to recite her poem "On the Pulse of Morning" during his inauguration in 1993.

Angelou's successful acting career included roles in numerous plays, films, and television programs, among them her appearance in the television mini-series Roots in 1977. Her screenplay, Georgia, Georgia (1972), was the first original script by a Black woman to be produced, and she was the first African American woman to direct a major motion picture, Down in the Delta, in 1998.

=== Chronology of autobiographies ===
- I Know Why the Caged Bird Sings (1969): Up to 1944 (age 17)
- Gather Together in My Name (1974): 1944–48
- Singin' and Swingin' and Gettin' Merry Like Christmas (1976): 1949–55
- The Heart of a Woman (1981): 1957–62
- All God's Children Need Traveling Shoes (1986): 1962–65
- A Song Flung Up to Heaven (2002): 1965–68
- Mom & Me & Mom (2013): overview

== Reception and legacy ==
=== Influence ===
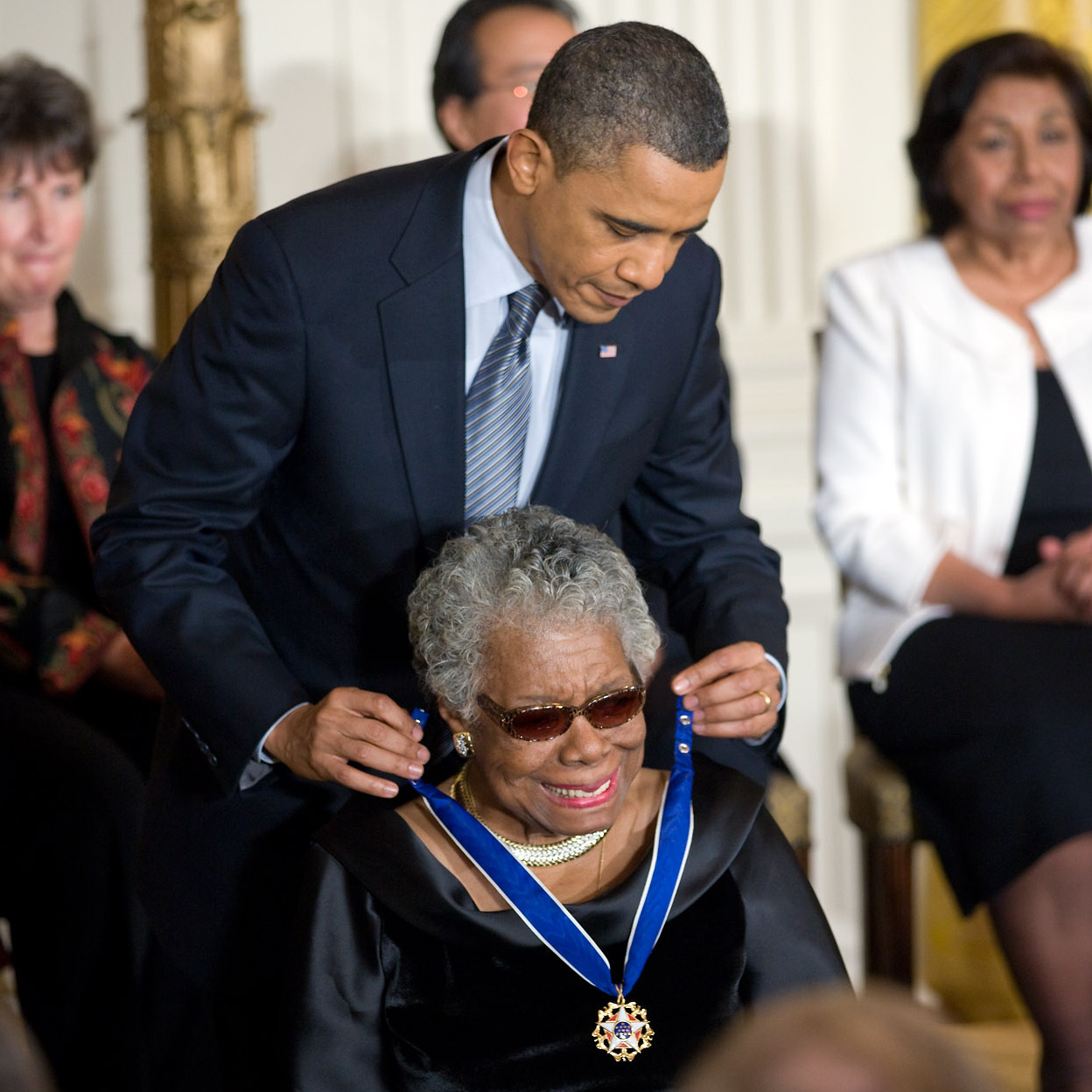
U.S. president Barack Obama presenting Angelou with the Presidential Medal of Freedom, 2011

When I Know Why the Caged Bird Sings was published in 1969, Angelou was hailed as a new kind of memoirist, one of the first African American women who were able to publicly discuss their personal lives. According to scholar Hilton Als, up to that point, Black female writers were marginalized to the point that they were unable to present themselves as central characters in the literature they wrote. Linguist John McWhorter agreed, seeing Angelou's works, which he called "tracts", as "apologetic writing". He placed Angelou in the tradition of African American literature as a defense of Black culture, which he called "a literary manifestation of the imperative that reigned in the black scholarship of the period". Writer Julian Mayfield, who called Caged Bird "a work of art that eludes description", argued that Angelou's autobiographies set a precedent for not only other Black women writers, but also African American autobiography as a whole. Als said that Caged Bird marked one of the first times that a Black autobiographer could, as he put it, "write about blackness from the inside, without apology or defense". Through the writing of her autobiography, Angelou became recognized and highly respected as a spokesperson for Blacks and women. It made her "without a doubt, ... America's most visible black woman autobiographer", and "a major autobiographical voice of the time". As writer Gary Younge said, "Probably more than almost any other writer alive, Angelou's life literally is her work."

Als said that Caged Bird helped increase Black feminist writings in the 1970s, less through its originality than "its resonance in the prevailing Zeitgeist", or the time in which it was written, at the end of the American civil rights movement. Als also claimed that Angelou's writings, more interested in self-revelation than in politics or feminism, have freed other female writers to "open themselves up without shame to the eyes of the world". Angelou critic Joanne M. Braxton stated that Caged Bird was "perhaps the most aesthetically pleasing" autobiography written by an African American woman in its era. Angelou's poetry has influenced the modern hip-hop music community, including artists such as Kanye West, Common, Tupac Shakur, and Nicki Minaj.

=== Critical reception ===
Reviewer Elsie B. Washington called Angelou "the black woman's poet laureate". Sales of the paperback version of her books and poetry rose by 300–600% the week after Angelou's recitation. Random House, which published the poem later that year, had to reprint 400,000 copies of all her books to keep up with the demand. They sold more of her books in January 1993 than they did in all of 1992, accounting for a 1,200% increase. Angelou famously said, in response to criticism regarding using the details of her life in her work, "I agree with Balzac and 19th-century writers, black and white, who say, 'I write for money'." Younge, speaking after the publication of Angelou's third book of essays, Letter to My Daughter (2008), has said, "For the last couple of decades she has merged her various talents into a kind of performance art—issuing a message of personal and social uplift by blending poetry, song and conversation."

Angelou's books, especially I Know Why the Caged Bird Sings, have been criticized by many parents, causing their removal from school curricula and library shelves. According to the National Coalition Against Censorship, some parents and some schools have objected to Caged Bird's depictions of lesbianism, premarital cohabitation, pornography, and violence. Some have been critical of the book's sexually explicit scenes, use of language, and irreverent depictions of religion. Caged Bird appeared third on the American Library Association (ALA) list of the 100 Most Frequently Challenged Books of 1990–2000 and sixth on the ALA's 2000–2009 list.

=== Awards and honors ===
Angelou was honored by universities, literary organizations, government agencies, and special interest groups. Her honors included a Pulitzer Prize nomination for her book of poetry, Just Give Me a Cool Drink of Water 'fore I Diiie, a Tony Award nomination for her role in the 1973 play Look Away, and three Grammys for her spoken-word albums. She served on two presidential committees, and was awarded the Spingarn Medal in 1994, the National Medal of Arts in 2000, and the Presidential Medal of Freedom in 2011. Angelou was awarded more than fifty honorary degrees. In 2021, the United States Mint announced that Angelou would be among the first women depicted on the reverse of the quarter as a part of the American Women quarters series. The coins were released in January 2022. She is the first Black woman to be depicted on a quarter.

=== Uses in education ===
Angelou's autobiographies have been used in narrative and multicultural approaches in teacher education. Jocelyn A. Glazier, a professor at George Washington University, has trained teachers how to "talk about race" in their classrooms with I Know Why the Caged Bird Sings and Gather Together in My Name. According to Glazier, Angelou's use of understatement, self-mockery, humor, and irony have left readers of Angelou's autobiographies unsure of what she left out and how they should respond to the events she described. Angelou's depictions of her experiences of racism have forced white readers to either explore their feelings about race and their own "privileged status", or to avoid the discussion as a means of keeping their privilege. Glazier found that critics have focused on the way Angelou fits within the genre of African American autobiography and on her literary techniques, but readers have tended to react to her storytelling with "surprise, particularly when [they] enter the text with certain expectations about the genre of autobiography".

Educator Daniel Challener, in his 1997 book Stories of Resilience in Childhood, analyzed the events in Caged Bird to illustrate resiliency in children. He argued that Angelou's book has provided a "useful framework" for exploring the obstacles many children like Maya have faced and how their communities have helped them succeed. Psychologist Chris Boyatzis has reported using Caged Bird to supplement scientific theory and research in the instruction of child development topics such as the development of self-concept and self-esteem, ego resilience, industry versus inferiority, effects of abuse, parenting styles, sibling and friendship relations, gender issues, cognitive development, puberty, and identity formation in adolescence. He found Caged Bird a "highly effective" tool for providing real-life examples of these psychological concepts.

In 2025, Connie and Peter Roop published a children's book illustrated by Noa Denmon, entitled Maya Angelou Finds Her Voice, which Publishers Weekly described as a "sensitively rendered biography".

== Poetry ==
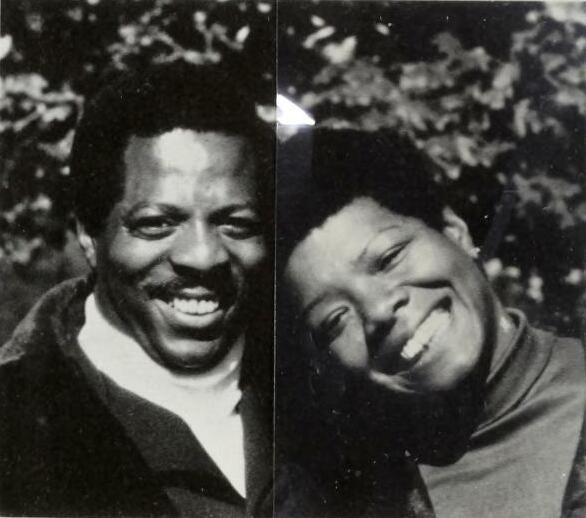
Angelou with Tom Feelings, who illustrated Now Sheba Sings the Song, her 1987 book of poetry.

Angelou is best known for her seven autobiographies, but she was also a prolific and successful poet. She was called "the black woman's poet laureate", and her poems have been called the anthems of African Americans. Angelou studied and began writing poetry at a young age, and used poetry and other great literature to cope with her rape as a young girl, as described in Caged Bird. According to scholar Yasmin Y. DeGout, literature also affected Angelou's sensibilities as the poet and writer she became, especially the "liberating discourse that would evolve in her own poetic canon".

Many critics consider Angelou's autobiographies more important than her poetry. Although all her books have been bestsellers, her poetry has not been perceived to be as serious as her prose and has been understudied. Her poems were more interesting when she recited and performed them, and many critics emphasized the public aspect of her poetry. Angelou's lack of critical acclaim has been attributed to both the public nature of many of her poems and to Angelou's popular success, and to critics' preferences for poetry as a written form rather than a verbal, performed one. Zofia Burr has countered Angelou's critics by condemning them for not taking into account Angelou's larger purposes in her writing: "to be representative rather than individual, authoritative rather than confessional".

In the view of Harold Bloom, Professor of Literature (Yale University and New York University) and literary critic:

Her poetry has a large public, but very little critical esteem. It is, in every sense, "popular poetry," and makes no formal or cognitive demands upon the reader. Of Angelou's sincerity, good-will towards all, and personal vitality, there can be no doubt. She is professionally an inspirational writer, of the self-help variety, which perhaps places her beyond criticism. [...] Angelou seems best at ballads, the most traditional kind of popular poetry. The function of such work is necessarily social rather than aesthetic, particularly in an era totally dominated by visual media. One has to be grateful for the benignity, humor, and whole-heartedness of Angelou's project, even if her autobiographical prose necessarily centers her achievement.

== Style and genre in autobiographies ==
Angelou's use of fiction-writing techniques such as dialogue, characterization, and development of theme, setting, plot, and language has often resulted in the placement of her books into the genre of autobiographical fiction. Angelou made a deliberate attempt in her books to challenge the common structure of the autobiography by critiquing, changing, and expanding the genre. Scholar Mary Jane Lupton argues that all of Angelou's autobiographies conform to the genre's standard structure: they are written by a single author, they are chronological, and they contain elements of character, technique, and theme. Angelou recognizes that there are fictional aspects to her books; Lupton agrees, stating that Angelou tended to "diverge from the conventional notion of autobiography as truth", which parallels the conventions of much of African American autobiography written during the abolitionist period of U.S. history, when as both Lupton and African American scholar Crispin Sartwell put it, the truth was censored out of the need for self-protection. Scholar Lyman B. Hagen places Angelou in the long tradition of African American autobiography but claims that Angelou created a unique interpretation of the autobiographical form.

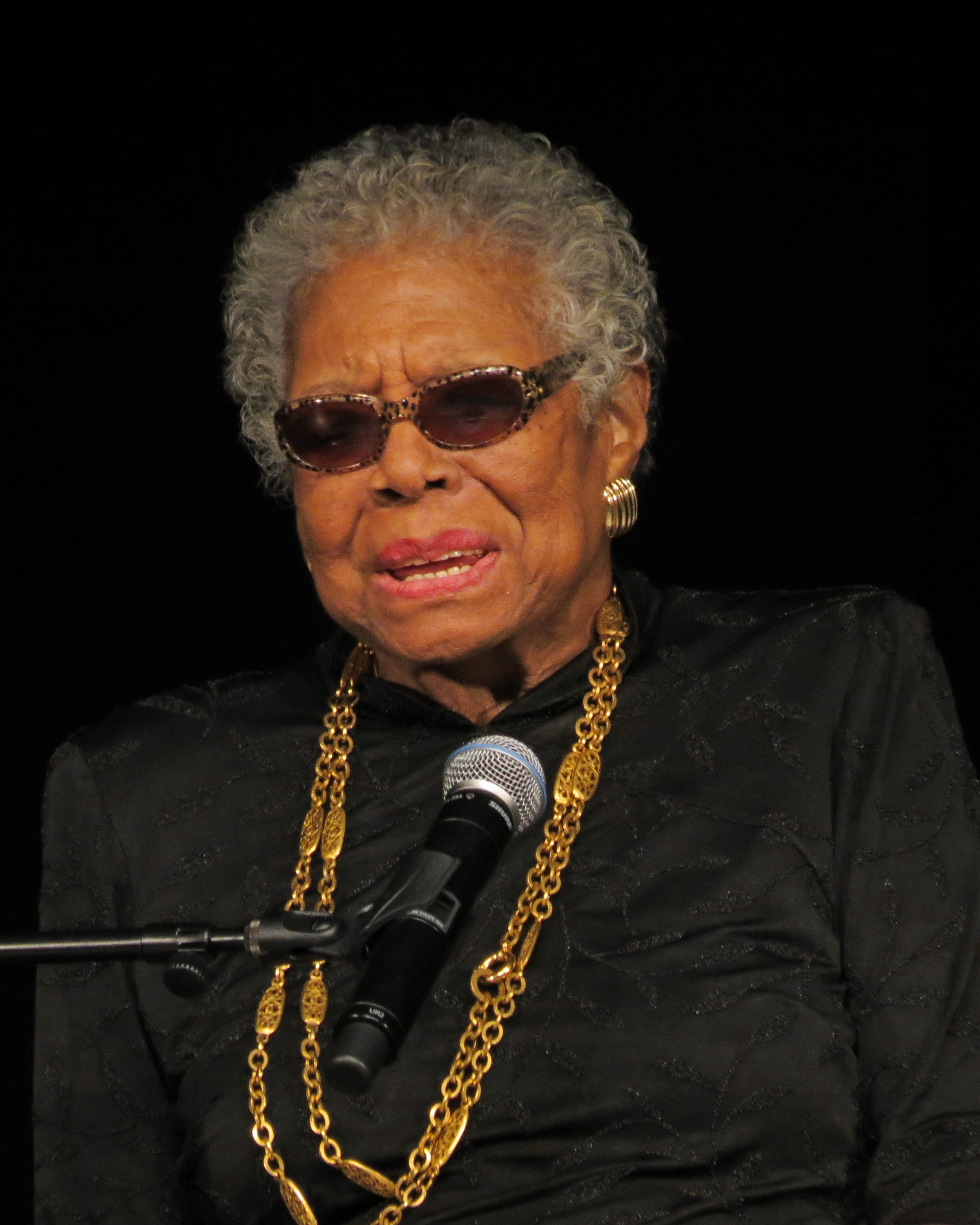
Angelou at York College in February 2013

According to African American literature scholar Pierre A. Walker, the challenge for much of the history of African American literature was that its authors have had to confirm its status as literature before they could accomplish their political goals, which was why Angelou's editor Robert Loomis was able to dare her into writing Caged Bird by challenging her to write an autobiography that could be considered "high art". Angelou acknowledged that she followed the slave narrative tradition of "speaking in the first-person singular talking about the first-person plural, always saying I meaning 'we'". Scholar John McWhorter calls Angelou's books "tracts" that defend African American culture and fight negative stereotypes. According to McWhorter, Angelou structured her books, which to him seem to be written more for children than for adults, to support her defense of Black culture. McWhorter sees Angelou as she depicts herself in her autobiographies "as a kind of stand-in figure for the Black American in Troubled Times". McWhorter views Angelou's works as dated but recognizes that "she has helped to pave the way for contemporary black writers who are able to enjoy the luxury of being merely individuals, no longer representatives of the race, only themselves". Scholar Lynn Z. Bloom compares Angelou's works to the writings of Frederick Douglass, stating that both fulfilled the same purpose: to describe Black culture and to interpret it for their wider, white audiences.

According to scholar Sondra O'Neale, Angelou's poetry can be placed within the African American oral tradition, and her prose "follows classic technique in nonpoetic Western forms". O'Neale states that Angelou avoided using a "monolithic Black language", and accomplished, through direct dialogue, what O'Neale calls a "more expected ghetto expressiveness". McWhorter finds both the language Angelou used in her autobiographies and the people she depicted unrealistic, resulting in a separation between her and her audience. As McWhorter states, "I have never read autobiographical writing where I had such a hard time summoning a sense of how the subject talks, or a sense of who the subject really is". McWhorter asserts, for example, that key figures in Angelou's books, like herself, her son Guy, and mother Vivian do not speak as one would expect, and that their speech is "cleaned up" for her readers. Guy, for example, represents the young Black male, while Vivian represents the idealized mother figure, and the stiff language they use, as well as the language in Angelou's text, is intended to prove that Blacks can use standard English competently.

McWhorter recognizes that much of the reason for Angelou's style was the "apologetic" nature of her writing. When Angelou wrote Caged Bird at the end of the 1960s, one of the necessary and accepted features of literature at the time was "organic unity", and one of her goals was to create a book that satisfied that criterion. The events in her books were episodic and crafted like a series of short stories, but their arrangements did not follow a strict chronology. Instead, they were placed to emphasize the themes of her books, which include racism, identity, family, and travel. English literature scholar Valerie Sayers has asserted that "Angelou's poetry and prose are similar". They both rely on her "direct voice", which alternates steady rhythms with syncopated patterns and uses similes and metaphors (e.g., the caged bird). According to Hagen, Angelou's works were influenced by both conventional literary and the oral traditions of the African American community. For example, she referenced more than 100 literary characters throughout her books and poetry. In addition, she used the elements of blues music, including the act of testimony when speaking of one's life and struggles, ironic understatement, and the use of natural metaphors, rhythms, and intonations. Angelou, instead of depending upon plot, used personal and historical events to shape her books.
