= Themes in Maya Angelou's autobiographies =

Themes including racism, identity, family, and travel

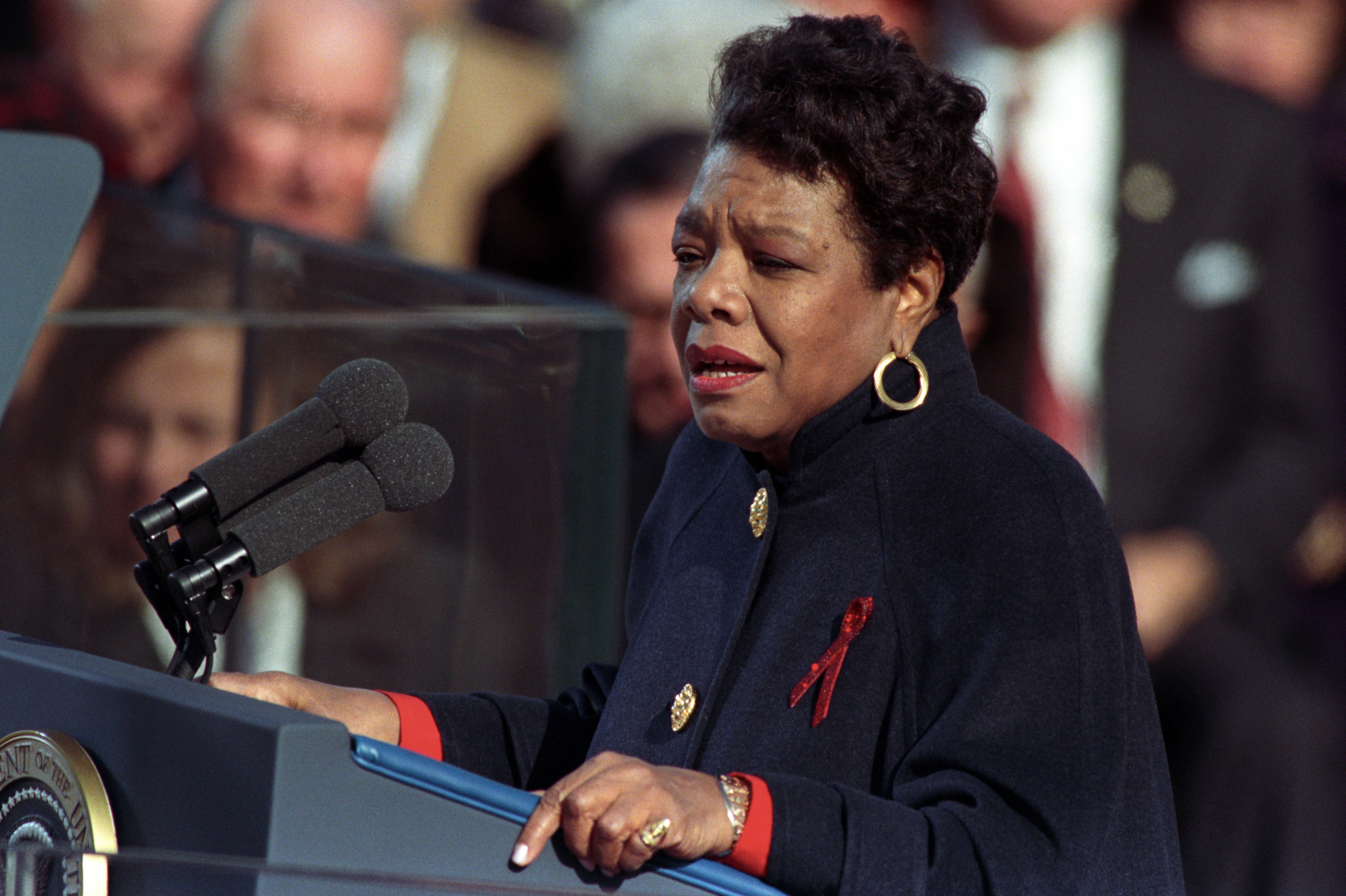
Maya Angelou, reciting her poem, "On the Pulse of Morning", at the 1993 inauguration of President Bill Clinton

The themes encompassed in African-American writer Maya Angelou's seven autobiographies include racism, identity, family, and travel. Angelou (1928–2014) is best known for her first autobiography, I Know Why the Caged Bird Sings (1969). The rest of the books in her series are Gather Together in My Name (1974), Singin' and Swingin' and Gettin' Merry Like Christmas (1976), The Heart of a Woman (1981), All God's Children Need Traveling Shoes (1986), A Song Flung Up to Heaven (2002), and Mom & Me & Mom (2013).

Beginning with Caged Bird and ending with her final autobiography, Angelou uses the metaphor of a bird (which represents the confinement of racism and depression) struggling to escape its cage, as described in the Paul Laurence Dunbar poem "Sympathy". Angelou's autobiographies can be placed in the African-American literature tradition of political protest. Their unity underscores one of Angelou's central themes: the injustice of racism and how to fight it. According to scholar Pierre A. Walker, all of Angelou's books describe "a sequence of lessons about resisting racist oppression". In the course of her autobiographies, her views about Black-white relationships changed and she learned to accept different points of view. Angelou's theme of identity was established from the beginning of her autobiographies, with the opening lines in Caged Bird, and like other female writers in the late 1960s and early 1970s, she used the autobiography to reimagine ways of writing about women's lives and identities in a male-dominated society. Her original goal was to write about the lives of Black women in America, but it evolved in her later volumes to document the ups and downs of her own personal and professional life.

The theme of family and family relationships—from the character-defining experience of Angelou's parents' abandonment in Caged Bird to her relationships with her son, husbands, friends, and lovers—are important in all of her books. As in American autobiography generally and in African-American autobiography specifically, which has its roots in the slave narrative, travel is another important theme in Angelou's autobiographies. Scholar Yolanda M. Manora called the travel motif in Angelou's autobiographies, beginning in Caged Bird, "a central metaphor for a psychic mobility". Angelou's autobiographies "stretch time and place", from Arkansas to Africa and back to the US, and span almost forty years, beginning from the start of World War II to the assassination of Martin Luther King Jr.

== Background ==
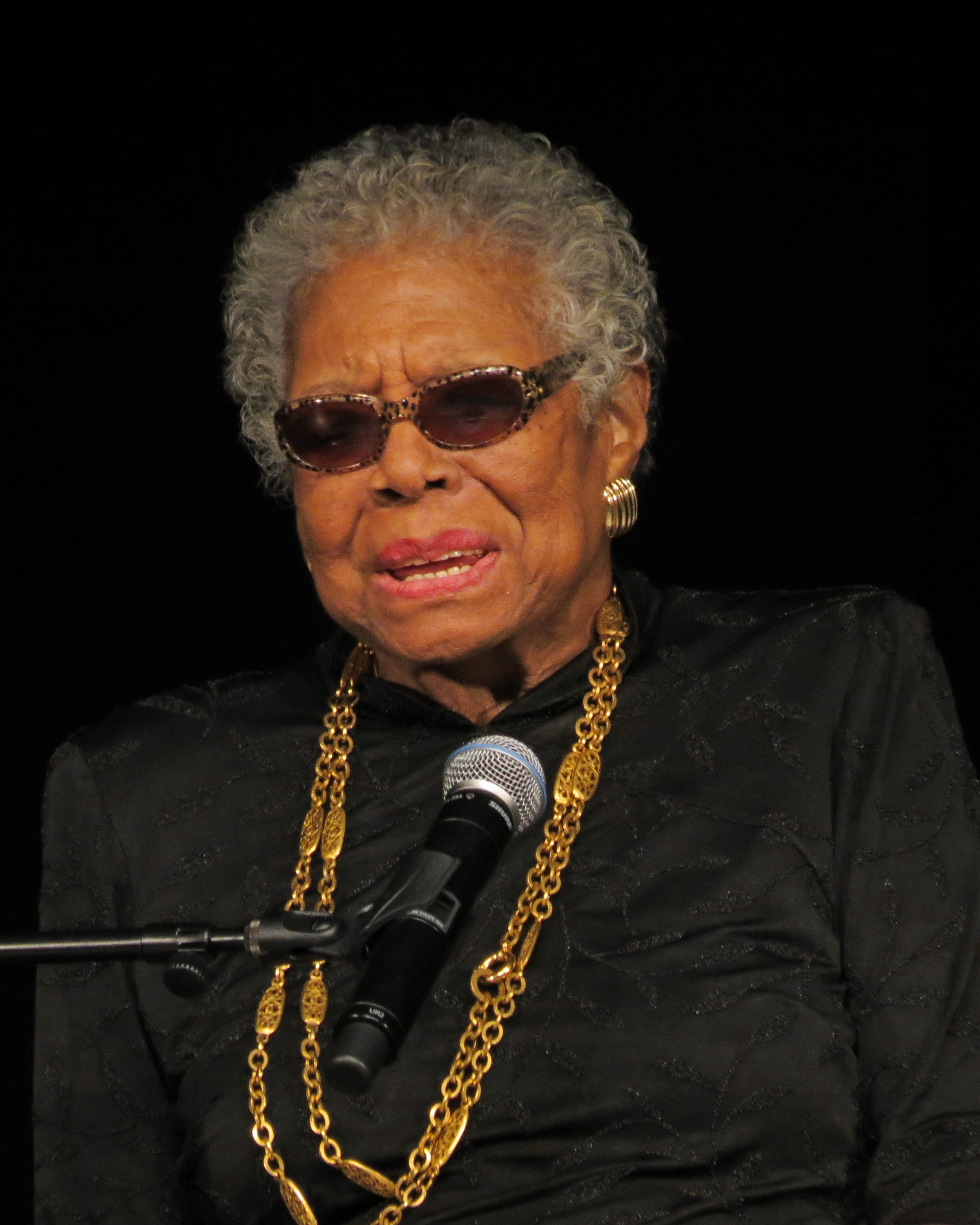
Maya Angelou, in 2013, at 85 years old

Before writing I Know Why the Caged Bird Sings at the age of forty, Maya Angelou had a long and varied career, holding jobs such as composer, singer, actor, civil rights worker, journalist, and educator. In the late 1950s, she joined the Harlem Writers Guild, where she met a number of important African-American authors, including her friend and mentor James Baldwin. After hearing civil rights leader Dr. Martin Luther King Jr. speak for the first time in 1960, she was inspired to join the Civil Rights Movement. She organized several benefits for him, and he named her Northern Coordinator of the Southern Christian Leadership Conference. She worked for several years in Ghana, West Africa, as a journalist, actress, and educator. She was invited back to the US by Malcolm X to work for him shortly before his assassination in 1965. In 1968, King asked her to organize a march, but he too was assassinated on April 4, which also happened to be her birthday.

Angelou was deeply depressed in the months following King's assassination, so to help lift her spirits, Baldwin brought her to a dinner party at the home of cartoonist Jules Feiffer and his wife Judy in late 1968. The guests began telling stories of their childhoods and Angelou's stories impressed Judy Feiffer. The next day she called Robert Loomis at Random House, who became Angelou's editor throughout her long writing career until he retired in 2011, and "told him that he ought to get this woman to write a book". At first, Angelou refused, since she thought of herself as a poet and playwright. According to Angelou, Baldwin had a "covert hand" in getting her to write the book, and advised Loomis to use "a little reverse psychology", and reported that Loomis tricked her into it by daring her: "It's just as well", he said, "because to write an autobiography as literature is just about impossible". Angelou was unable to resist a challenge, and she began writing Caged Bird.

Angelou did not write Caged Bird with the intention of writing a series of autobiographies, however critics have "judged the subsequent autobiographies in light of the first", with Caged Bird generally receiving the highest praise. Angelou's autobiographies have a distinct style, (Note: See Maya Angelou#Style and genre in autobiographies.) and "stretch over time and place", from Arkansas to Africa and back to the U.S. They take place from the beginnings of World War II to the assassination of Martin Luther King Jr. According to scholar Mary Jane Lupton, Angelou's autobiographies have been characterized as autobiographical fiction, but Lupton disagrees, stating that they conform to the genre's standard structure: they are written by a single author, they are chronological, and they contain elements of character, technique, and theme.

Angelou's use of themes, especially that of racism, connects all seven autobiographies. One of her goals, beginning with Caged Bird, was to incorporate "organic unity" into them, and the events she described were episodic, crafted like a series of short stories, and were placed to emphasize the themes of her books. Through the writing of her life stories in her autobiographies, Angelou became recognized and highly respected as a spokesperson for Blacks and women. According to scholar Joanne Braxton, it made her "without a doubt ... America's most visible black woman autobiographer".

Beginning with Caged Bird, Angelou used the same "writing ritual" for many years, for most of her books and poetry. She would get up at five in the morning and check into a hotel room, where the staff were instructed to remove any pictures from the walls. She wrote on yellow legal pads while lying on the bed, with a bottle of sherry, a deck of cards to play solitaire, Roget's Thesaurus, and the Bible, and left by the early afternoon. She averaged 10–12 pages of material a day, which she edited down to three or four pages in the evening. Lupton stated that this ritual indicated "a firmness of purpose and an inflexible use of time". Angelou went through this process to give herself time to turn the events of her life into art, and to "enchant" herself; as she said in a 1989 interview with the BBC, to "relive the agony, the anguish, the Sturm und Drang". She placed herself back in the time she wrote about, even during traumatic experiences like her rape in Caged Bird, to "tell the human truth" about her life. Critic Opal Moore says about Caged Bird: "...Though easily read, [it] is no 'easy read'". Angelou stated that she played cards to reach that place of enchantment, to access her memories more effectively. She has stated, "It may take an hour to get into it, but once I'm in it—ha! It's so delicious!" She did not find the process cathartic; rather, she found relief in "telling the truth".

== Racism ==
=== Caged Bird and Gather Together ===
Angelou uses the metaphor of a bird struggling to escape its cage described in the Paul Laurence Dunbar poem "Sympathy" throughout all of her autobiographies; she uses the metaphor in the titles of both I Know Why the Caged Bird Sings and her sixth autobiography A Song Flung Up to Heaven. Like elements within a prison narrative, the "caged bird" represents Angelou's confinement resulting from racism and oppression. This metaphor also invokes the "supposed contradiction of the bird singing in the midst of its struggle". Reviewer Hilton Als observed that Angelou's witnessing of the evil in her society, as directed towards Black women, shaped Angelou's young life and informed her views into adulthood. Scholar Lynn Z. Bloom asserted that Angelou's autobiographies and lectures, which she called "ranging in tone from warmly humorous to bitterly satiric", have gained a respectful and enthusiastic response from the general public and critics.

I know why the caged bird sings, ah me,
When his wing is bruised and his bosom sore,—
When he beats his bars and would be free;
It is not a carol of joy or glee,
But a prayer that he sends from his heart's deep core,
But a plea, that upward to Heaven he flings—
I know why the caged bird sings!

— Third and final stanza of Paul Laurence Dunbar's poem "Sympathy".

Reviewer Daisy Aldan of World Literature Today criticized Angelou for harboring "a fanatic hostility expressed toward all white people", but writer Lyman B. Hagen disagreed, stating that like Angelou's friend and mentor Langston Hughes, Angelou explained and illuminated the conditions of African Americans, but without alienating her readers of any race. Hagen also argued that Angelou promotes the importance of hard work, a common theme in slave narratives, throughout all her autobiographies, in order to break stereotypes of laziness associated with African-Americans. For instance, Angelou's description of the strong and cohesive Black community of Stamps demonstrates how African Americans have subverted repressive institutions to withstand racism. Angelou evolved from wishing that she could become white in Caged Bird to being "forced to contend with her blackness".

Critic Pierre A. Walker placed Angelou's autobiographies in the African-American literature tradition of political protest written in the years following the American Civil Rights Movement. He emphasized that the unity of Angelou's autobiographies underscored one of her central themes: the injustice of racism and how to fight it. Angelou's autobiographies, beginning with Caged Bird, consisted of "a sequence of lessons about resisting racist oppression". This sequence led Angelou, as the protagonist, from "helpless rage and indignation to forms of subtle resistance, and finally to outright and active protest". In the course of her work, Angelou changed her views about Black-white relationships and learned to accept different points of view. It was the changes in how she regarded race and her views of white people that provided Angelou with freedom. According to Hagen, one of Angelou's themes was that humans tend to be more alike than different.

I note the obvious differences between each sort and type, but we are more alike, my friends, than we are unalike.
— Maya Angelou, 1990 Scholar Mary Jane Lupton has called this one of Angelou's most well-known sayings.

Angelou's goal, beginning with Caged Bird, was to "tell the truth about the lives of black women". Like her other autobiographies, she described her living arrangements, how she coped within the context of a larger white society, and the ways that her story played out within that context. Critic Selwyn Cudjoe stated that in Angelou's second autobiography, Gather Together in My Name, Angelou was concerned with the questions of what it meant to be a Black woman in the U.S. in the years immediately following World War II. Written three years after Caged Bird, Gather Together "depicts a single mother's slide down the social ladder into poverty and crime". It begins with a prologue describing the confusion and disillusionment of the African-American community during that time, which matched the alienated and fragmented nature of the main character's life. According to critic Dolly A. McPherson, African Americans were promised a new racial order that never materialized. Angelou also compares and contrasts how she and her grandmother dealt with racism; Angelou with defiance and the pragmatic take of her grandmother, who had learned that defiance was dangerous. In 1971, Angelou published her first volume of poetry, Just Give Me a Cool Drink of Water 'fore I Diiie (1971), which became a bestseller and was nominated for a Pulitzer Prize. (It was Angelou's early practice to alternate a prose volume with a poetry volume.)

=== Singin' and Swingin' ===
Angelou's third autobiography Singin' and Swingin' and Gettin' Merry Like Christmas (1976) marked the first time a well-known African-American woman writer had expanded her life story into a third autobiography. She marries a white man, and comes into intimate contact with whites who were very different from the racists she encountered in her childhood. She discovered that her distrust of whites had developed to protect herself from their cruelty and indifference. As McPherson indicated, "Conditioned by earlier experiences, Angelou distrusts everyone, especially whites. Nevertheless, she is repeatedly surprised by the kindness and goodwill of many whites she meets, and, thus, her suspicions begin to soften into understanding". Cudjoe wrote that in Singin' and Swingin', Angelou effectively demonstrated "the inviolability of the African American personhood", as well as her own closely guarded defense of it. In order for her to have any positive relationships with whites and people of other races; however, McPherson insisted that Angelou "must examine and discard her stereotypical views about Whites". Scholar Lyman B. Hagen agreed and pointed out that Angelou had to re-examine her lingering prejudices when faced with a broader world full of different kinds of white people.

The stories she tells in Singin' and Swingin' contain "strong forceful statements that convey firmly her indignation and ire about black displacement". For example, when she marries Tosh Angelos against her mother's advice and wishes, she experiences negative reactions from others. Although Tosh treated her and her son Guy well at the beginning of their marriage, he quickly tired of their relationship and she felt used and betrayed by another white man. Angelou moved between the white and Black worlds, both defining herself as a member of her community and encountering whites in "a much fuller, more sensuous manner". She describes the tension she experienced as a Black woman entertainer, functioning in the white-dominated world of the 1950s. Her perceptions of relationships between Blacks and whites had to be constantly modified, despite the attitudes and ideas about whites she learned from her mother and grandmother. Angelou's feelings about race and racism were ambivalent as she began to have increasingly positive experiences with white people.

=== Heart of a Woman ===
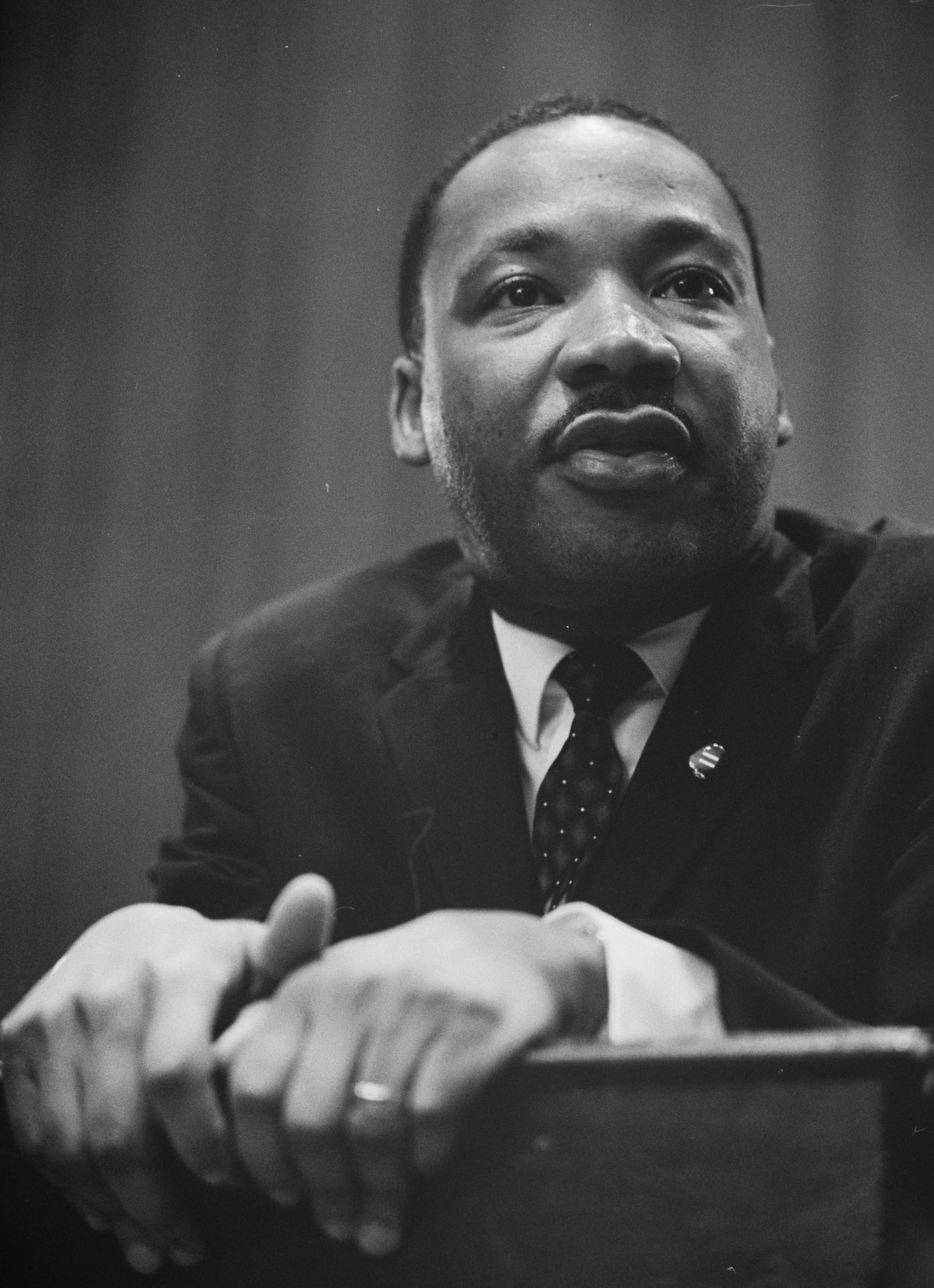
Martin Luther King Jr. Angelou's work with King was called "successful and efficient".

By the time Angelou's fourth autobiography, The Heart of a Woman, was published in 1981, the success of her previous autobiographies and the publication of three volumes of poetry had brought Angelou a considerable amount of fame. The book opens with Angelou and her son Guy living in an experimental commune with whites, in an attempt to participate in the new openness between Blacks and whites. She was not completely comfortable with the arrangement, however; as Lupton pointed out, Angelou was still distrustful of whites and never named or described the characters of her roommates. For the most part, Angelou freely interacts with white people in this book, but she occasionally encounters prejudice reminiscent of her early years, such as when she requires the assistance of white friends to rent a home in a segregated neighborhood. Lupton stated that compared to her other books, Angelou had come "a long way" in her interactions with whites and people of other races. She remained suspicious of white liberals, but reported on Dr. Martin Luther King Jr.'s optimism about race relations and other positive interactions with whites. Angelou maintains her indictment of the white power structure, and her protests against racial injustice became a theme throughout all her books. Instead of offering solutions, however, she simply reports on, reacts to, and dramatizes events.

Angelou became more "politicized" in The Heart of Woman, and developed a new sense of Black identity. McPherson argued that even Angelou's decision to leave show business was political, and regarded this book as "a social and cultural history of Black Americans" during the late 1950s and early 1960s. Angelou saw herself as a historian of both the Civil Rights movement and the Black literary movement. She became more attracted to the causes of Black militants, both in the U.S. and in Africa, to the point of entering into a relationship with South African freedom fighter Vusumzi Make, and became more committed to activism. She became an active political protestor during this period, and she used the autobiographical form to demonstrate how the Civil Rights movement influenced one person involved in it. According to Hagen, her contributions to civil rights as a fundraiser and SCLC organizer were successful and effective.

=== Traveling Shoes ===
According to Lupton, "Angelou's exploration of her African and African-American identities" was an important theme in her fifth autobiography All God's Children Need Traveling Shoes (1986). McPherson called Travelling Shoes "a mixture of Maya Angelou's personal recollection and a historical document of the time in which it is set", the early 1960s. This was the first time that many Black Americans, due to the independence of Ghana and other African states, as well as the emergence of African leaders such as Kwame Nkrumah, were able to view Africa in a positive way. Ghana was "the center of an African cultural renaissance" and of Pan-Africanism during this time. The alliances and relationships with the people Angelou met in Ghana contributed to her identity and growth. Her experiences as an expatriate helped her come to terms with her personal and historical past, and by the end of the book she is ready to return to America with a deeper understanding of both the African and American parts of her character. McPherson called Angelou's parallels and connections between Africa and America her "double-consciousness", which contributed to her understanding of herself.

In Traveling Shoes, Angelou is able to recognize similarities between African and African-American culture; as Lupton put it, the "blue songs, shouts, and gospels" she has grown up with in America "echo the rhythms of West Africa". Marcia Ann Gillespie and her colleagues, writing in A Glorious Celebration, published in 2008 for Angelou's 80th birthday, agreed, stating that Angelou recognized the connections between African and American Black cultures, including the children's games, the folklore, the spoken and non-verbal languages, the food, sensibilities, and behavior. She connects the behavior of many African mother figures, especially their generosity, with her grandmother's actions. In one of the most significant sections of Traveling Shoes, Angelou recounts an encounter with a West African woman who recognized her, on the basis of her appearance, as a member of the Bambara group of West Africa. These and other experiences in Ghana demonstrated Angelou's maturity, as a mother able to let go of her adult son, as a woman no longer dependent upon a man, and as an American able to "perceive the roots of her identity" and how they affected her personality.

Also in Traveling Shoes, Angelou comes to terms with her difficult past, both as a descendant of Africans taken forcibly to America as slaves and as an African America who had experienced segregation and Jim Crow racism. As she told an interviewer, she brought her son to Ghana to protect him from the negative effects of racism because she did not think he had the tools to withstand them. For the first time in their lives, she and Guy did not "feel threatened by racial hate" in Ghana. The theme of racism was still an important theme in Traveling Shoes, but Angelou had matured in the way she dealt with it. As Hagen stated, Angelou was "not yet ready to toss off the stings of prejudice, but tolerance and even a certain understanding can be glimpsed". This was demonstrated in Angelou's treatment of the "genocidal involvement of Africans in slave-trading", something that has often been overlooked or misrepresented by other Black writers. Angelou was taught an important lesson about combating racism by Malcolm X, who compared it to a mountain in which everyone's efforts were needed to overcome it.

Angelou learned about herself and about racism throughout Traveling Shoes, even during her brief tour of Venice and Berlin for the revival of The Blacks, the play by Jean Genet that Angelou had originally performed in 1961; reuniting with the play's original cast, she revived her passion for African-American culture and values, "putting them into perspective" as she compared them with Germany's history of racial prejudice and military aggression. The verbal violence of the folk tales shared during her luncheon with her German hosts and Israeli friend was as significant to Angelou as physical violence, to the point that she became ill. Angelou's experience with fascism in Italy, her performances with 'The Blacks cast, and the reminders of the holocaust in Germany, "help[ed] shape and broaden her constantly changing vision" regarding racial prejudice, clarified her perceptions of African Americans, and "contribute to her reclaiming herself and her evolution as a citizen of the world".

== Identity ==
The theme of identity was established from the beginning of Angelou's series of autobiographies, with the opening lines in Caged Bird, which "foretell Angelou's autobiographical project: to write the story of the developing black female subject by sharing the tale of one Southern Black girl's becoming". Angelou and other female writers in the late 1960s and early 1970s used the autobiography to reimagine ways of writing about women's lives and identities in a male-dominated society. Feminist scholar Maria Lauret has made a connection between Angelou's autobiographies, which Lauret called "fictions of subjectivity" and "feminist first-person narratives", with fictional first-person narratives (such as The Women's Room by Marilyn French and The Golden Notebook by Doris Lessing) written during the same period. Both genres employed the narrator as protagonist and used "the illusion of presence in their mode of signification". Scholar Yolanda M. Manora agreed, stating that Angelou broke stereotypes of African-American women by describing these images and stereotypes, and then disproving them, which set the stage for Angelou's identity development in her later autobiographies.

When I try to describe myself to God I say, "Lord, remember me? Black? Female? Six-foot tall? The writer?" And I almost always get God's attention.
— Maya Angelou, 2008.

As a Black woman, Angelou demonstrates the formation of her own cultural identity throughout her narratives, and has used her many roles, incarnations, and identities to connect the layers of oppression within her personal history. Angelou also presents herself as a role model for African-American women more broadly by reconstructing the Black woman's image through themes of individual strength and the ability to overcome. Throughout her work, Angelou explores the women who influenced her evolution and growth. According to Manora, three characters in Caged Bird, Angelou's mother Vivian, her grandmother Annie Henderson, and Mrs. Flowers (who helps Angelou find her voice again after her rape), collaborated to "form a triad which serves as the critical matrix in which the child is nurtured and sustained during her journey through Southern Black girlhood". (Note: Manora categorized these women into three archetypes, which represented the Black woman in Angelou's autobiographies: Vivian as "the Black Jezebel", Annie as the "Black Matriarch", and Mrs. Flowers as "the Lady".)

Angelou's original goal was to write about the lives of Black women in America, but her voluminous work documents the ups and downs of her own life as well. Angelou's autobiographies provide a historical overview of the places she has lived and how she coped within the context of a racist white society. In her third autobiography, Singin' and Swingin' and Gettin' Merry Like Christmas, Angelou successfully demonstrates the integrity of the African-American character as she began to experience more positive interactions with whites. In Angelou's second volume, Gather Together in My Name, she was concerned with what it meant to be a Black female in the U.S., through the lens of her own experience. Writer Selwyn Cudjoe said regarding her second autobiography: "It is almost as though the incidents in the text were simply 'gathered together' under the name of Maya Angelou".

== Family ==
According to scholar Dolly McPherson, the theme of family and family relationships, which she called "kinship concerns", in Angelou's books begins with "a preoccupation with the traditional nuclear family", despite Angelou's experience of being abandoned by her parents in Caged Bird. Eventually, however, Angelou's concept of family expands to the extended family in which "trust is the key to a display of kinship concerns". Scholar Mary Jane Lupton insists that the concept of family must be understood in light of Maya and Bailey's displacement. Angelou's description of close familial relationships, such as her relationships with her parents and son (which Lupton called "the mother-child pattern") was a unifying theme that connected all of her autobiographies. Motherhood was a recurring theme, explored through Angelou's experiences as a single mother, a daughter, and a granddaughter. Lupton believed that Angelou's plot construction and character development were influenced by the mother/child motif found in the work of Harlem Renaissance poet Jessie Fauset.

Scholar Yolanda M. Manora insisted that three women in Caged Bird—the "hybridized mother" of Angelou's grandmother, her mother, and her friend Mrs. Flowers—taught her how to be a mother to her son Guy. Although Angelou's grandmother died early in the series, Angelou quotes her grandmother extensively in her third autobiography Singin' and Swingin' and Gettin' Merry Like Christmas. Angelou's desire for security for Guy drove her to marry Tosh Angelos in Singin' and Swingin', and drove many of her other decisions, job choices, and romantic relationships as well. Scholar Siphokazi Koyana stated that due to Angelou's race and economic background, her "experience of motherhood is inseparably intertwined with work". According to Koyana, "... Black motherhood always encompassed work". Angelou's long list of occupations attests to the challenges, especially in her second autobiography Gather Together in My Name, she faced as a working teenager mother, which often led Angelou to "quick and easy" decisions. Koyana stated that it was not until Angelou was able to take advantage of opportunities, such as her role in Porgy and Bess, when she was able to fully support herself and her son Guy, and the quality of her life and her contribution to society improved. It was impossible, however, for Angelou to become successful without her extended family to provide childcare; for example, she left Guy in the care of his grandmother in spite of the conflict and guilt she experienced as a result (something Koyana insisted was imposed on her by the larger society), a pattern established in Caged Bird by her own mother when she left Angelou and her brother in the care of Angelou's grandmother.

The woman who survives intact and happy must be at once tender and tough.
— Maya Angelou, Wouldn't Take Nothing For My Journey Now (1993)

Black women autobiographers like Angelou have debunked stereotypes surrounding African-American mothers, such as "breeder and matriarch", and have presented them as having more creative and satisfying roles. According to scholar Sondra O'Neale, Angelou's autobiographies presented Black women differently from their literary portrayals up to that time. O'Neale maintained that "no Black woman in the world of Angelou's books are losers", and that Angelou was the third generation of intelligent and resourceful women who overcame the obstacles of racism and oppression. Koyana recognized that Angelou depicted women and "womanist theories" in an era of cultural transition, and that her books described one Black woman's attempts to create and maintain a healthy self-esteem. Angelou's experiences as a working-class single mother challenged traditional and Western viewpoints of women and family life, including the nuclear family structure. Angelou described societal forces, strategies of economic survival, and differential experiences of family structure.

== Travel ==
Travel is a common theme in American autobiography as a whole; as McPherson stated, it is something of a national myth to Americans as a people. This was also the case for African-American autobiography, which was rooted in and developed out of the slave narrative tradition. Like the narratives that focused on the writers' search for freedom from bondage, modern African-American autobiographers like Angelou sought to develop "an authentic self" and the freedom to find it in their community. Scholar Yolanda M. Manora called the travel motif in Angelou's autobiographies "fluidity". This fluidity began in Caged Bird and was a metaphor for Angelou's psychological growth, influenced by her displacement and trauma throughout the book, something Manora states that Angelou had to escape in order to transcend. As Hagen stated, Angelou structured Caged Bird into three parts: arrival, sojourn, and departure, with both geographic and psychological aspects.

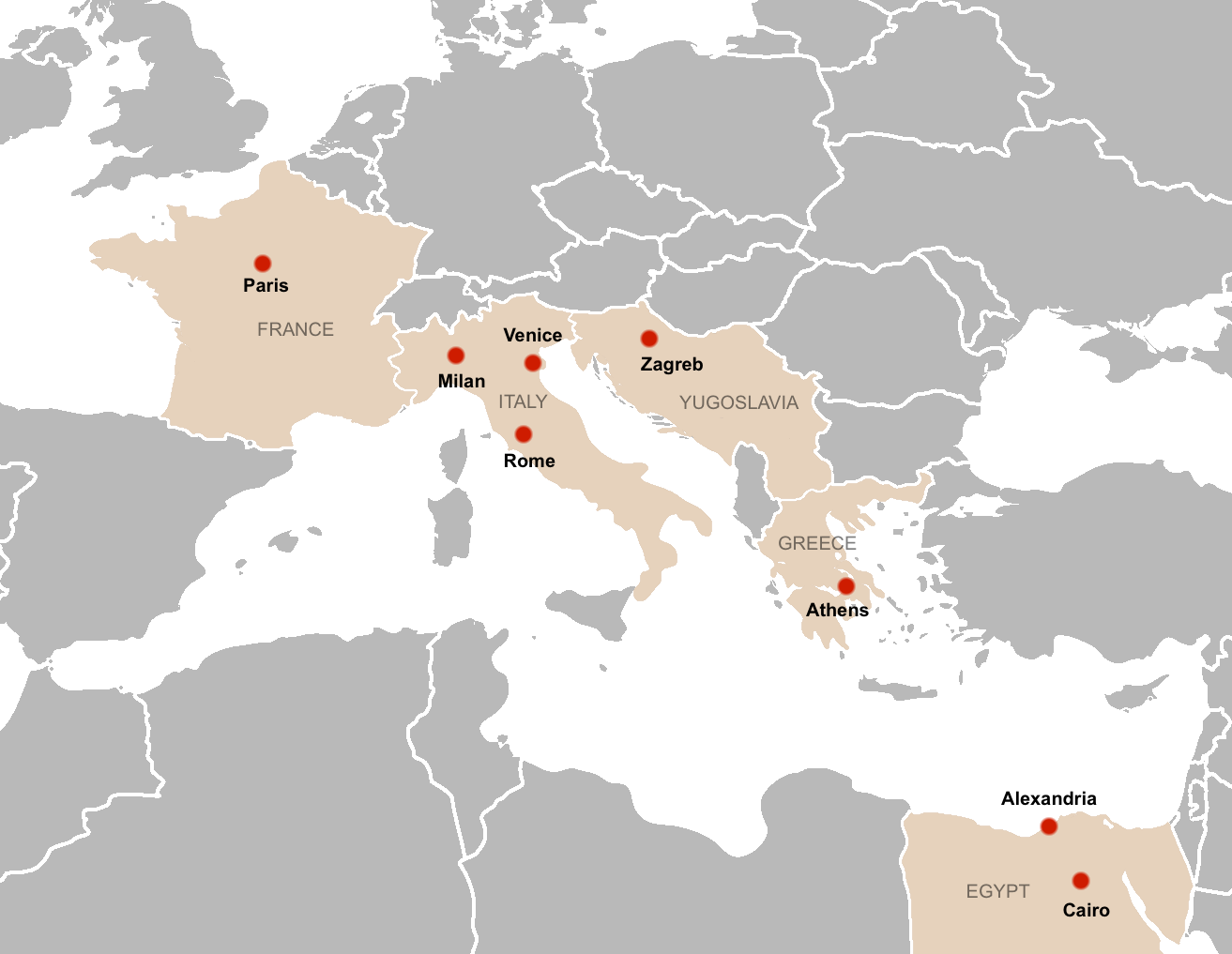
Map of the cities mentioned during Angelou's European tour with the opera Porgy and Bess, as depicted in her third autobiography, Singin' and Swingin' and Gettin' Merry Like Christmas.

As McPherson stated, "The journey to a distant goal, the return home, and the quest which involves the voyage out, achievement, and return are typical patterns in Black autobiography." For Angelou, this quest took her from her childhood and adolescence, as described in her first two books, into the adult world. The setting in Angelou's first two autobiographies was limited to three places (Arkansas, Missouri, and California), but the "setting breaks open" in Singin' and Swingin' and Gettin' Merry Like Christmas to include Europe as she traveled with her Porgy and Bess company. McPherson saw Angelou's third autobiography as "a sunny tour of Angelou's twenties", from early years marked by disappointments and humiliation, into the broader world and international community. This period described "years of joy", as well as the start of Angelou's great success and fulfillment as an entertainer. Lupton stated that Angelou's travel narrative in Singin' and Swingin', which took up approximately 40 percent of the book, gave the book its organized structure. However, Angelou's observations about race, gender, and class made the book more than a simple travel narrative. As a Black American, her travels around the world put her in contact with many nationalities and classes, expanded her experiences beyond her familiar circle of community and family, and complicated her understandings of race relations.

Angelou continued to expand the settings of her autobiographies in her subsequent volumes. The Heart of a Woman had three primary settings—the San Francisco Bay Area, New York City, and Egypt—and two secondary ones—London and Accra. Lupton stated that like all of Angelou's books, the structure of The Heart of a Woman was based upon a journey. Angelou emphasized the theme of movement by opening the book with a spiritual ("The ole ark's a moverin'"), stating, "That ancient spiritual could have been the theme song of the United States in 1957". This spiritual, which contains a reference to Noah's ark, presents Angelou as a type of Noah and demonstrates her spirituality. Angelou also mentions Allen Ginsberg and On the Road, the 1951 novel by Jack Kerouac, thus connecting her own journey and uncertainty about the future with the journeys of other literary figures. Although the reason Angelou traveled to Africa is an eventual failed relationship, she made a connection with the continent, both in this book and in the one that follows it, All God's Children Need Traveling Shoes. As Lupton stated, "Africa is the site of her growth". Angelou's time in Africa made her more aware of her African roots. Lupton insisted, however, that although Angelou journeys to many places in the book, the most important journey she described is "a voyage into the self".

The travel motif is a recurring theme in Traveling Shoes, as evidenced in the book's title, but Angelou's primary motivation for living in Africa, as she told interviewer George Plimpton in 1990, was "trying to get home". Angelou not only related her own journey of an African-American woman searching for a home, but the journeys of other Black expatriates at the time, and white expatriates in Europe in the 1920s, much like writers such as Ernest Hemingway and Henry James did. Angelou's issues were resolved at the end of Traveling Shoes when she decided to return to America. She called her departure a "second leave-taking", and compared it to the last time she left her son with his grandmother in Singin' and Swingin' when he was a child, and to the forced departure from Africa by her ancestors. As Lupton states, "Angelou's journey from Africa back to America is in certain ways a restatement of the historical phase known as mid-passage, when slaves were brutally transported in ships from West Africa to the so-called New World". Even though Angelou's sixth autobiography A Song Flung Up to Heaven took place in her home country, the travel motif continued. Reviewer Patricia Elam described Song as a "journey through an authentic and artistic life".

== Works cited ==
- Cudjoe, Selwyn (1984). "Maya Angelou and the Autobiographical Statement". In Black Women Writers (1950–1980): A Critical Evaluation, Mari Evans, ed. Garden City, N.Y: Doubleday. ISBN 978-0-385-17124-3
- Hagen, Lyman B. (1997). Heart of a Woman, Mind of a Writer, and Soul of a Poet: A Critical Analysis of the Writings of Maya Angelou. Lanham, Maryland: University Press. ISBN 978-0-7618-0621-9
- Lauret, Maria. (1994) Liberating literature: Feminist fiction in America. New York: Routledge.
- Lupton, Mary Jane (1998). Maya Angelou: A Critical Companion. Westport, Connecticut: Greenwood Press. ISBN 978-0-313-30325-8
- Manora, Yolanda M. (2005). "'What You Looking at Me For? I Didn't Come to Stay': Displacement, Disruption and Black Female Subjectivity in Maya Angelou's I Know Why the Caged Bird Sings." Women's Studies 34, no. 5: 359–375
- McPherson, Dolly A. (1990). Order Out of Chaos: The Autobiographical Works of Maya Angelou. New York: Peter Lang Publishing. ISBN 978-0-8204-1139-2
