= The Heart of a Woman =

1961 memoir by Maya Angelou

- First edition cover
- Author: Maya Angelou
- Language: English
- Genre: Autobiography
- Publisher: Random House
- Publication date: 1981
- Publication place: United States
- Media type: Print (hardback & paperback)
- Pages: 336 pp (hardcover 1st edition)
- ISBN: 978-0-8129-8032-5 (hardcover 1st edition)
- Preceded by: Singin' and Swingin' and Gettin' Merry Like Christmas
- Followed by: All God's Children Need Traveling Shoes
- Website: www.penguinrandomhouse.com/books/3954/the-heart-of-a-woman-by-maya-angelou/

The Heart of a Woman (1981) is an autobiography by American writer Maya Angelou. The book is the fourth installment in Angelou's series of seven autobiographies. The Heart of a Woman recounts events in Angelou's life between 1957 and 1962 and follows her travels to California, New York City, Cairo, and Ghana as she raises her teenage son, becomes a published author, becomes active in the civil rights movement, and becomes romantically involved with a South African anti-apartheid fighter. One of the most important themes of The Heart of a Woman is motherhood, as Angelou continues to raise her son. The book ends with her son leaving for college and Angelou looking forward to newfound independence and freedom.

Like Angelou's previous volumes, the book has been described as autobiographical fiction, though most critics, as well as Angelou, have characterized it as autobiography. Although most critics consider Angelou's first autobiography I Know Why the Caged Bird Sings more favorably, The Heart of a Woman has received positive reviews. It was chosen as an Oprah's Book Club selection in 1997.

Critic Mary Jane Lupton says it has "a narrative structure unsurpassed in American autobiography" and that it is Angelou's "most introspective" autobiography. The title is taken from a poem by Harlem Renaissance poet Georgia Douglas Johnson, which connects Angelou with other female African-American writers. African-American literature critic Lyman B. Hagen states, "Faithful to the ongoing themes of survival, sense of self, and continuing education, The Heart of a Woman moves its central figures to a point of full personhood". The book follows Angelou to several places in the US and Africa, but the most important journey she describes is "a voyage into the self."

== Background ==
The Heart of a Woman, published in 1981, is the fourth installment of Maya Angelou's series of seven autobiographies. The success of her previous autobiographies and the publication of three volumes of poetry had brought Angelou a considerable amount of fame by 1981. And Still I Rise, her third volume of poetry, was published in 1978 and reinforced Angelou's success as a writer. Her first volume of poetry, Just Give Me a Cool Drink of Water 'fore I Diiie (1971), was nominated for a Pulitzer Prize. (Note: It was Angelou's early practice to alternate a prose volume with a poetry volume.)

Writer Julian Mayfield states that Angelou's work set a precedent not only for other black women writers but for the genre of autobiography as a whole. (Note: Mayfield called Angelou's first autobiography, I Know Why the Caged Bird Sings, "a work of art that eludes description".) Angelou had become recognized and highly respected as a spokesperson for Blacks and women through the writing of her life stories. It made her, as scholar Joanne Braxton stated, "without a doubt ... America's most visible black woman autobiographer." Angelou was one of the first African-American female writers to discuss her personal life publicly, and one of the first to use herself as a central character in her books. Writer Hilton Als calls her a pioneer of self-exposure, willing to focus honestly on the more negative aspects of her personality and choices. While Angelou was composing her second autobiography, Gather Together in My Name, she was concerned about how her readers would react to her disclosure that she had been a prostitute. Her husband Paul Du Feu talked her into publishing the book by encouraging her to "tell the truth as a writer" and to "be honest about it."

In 1957, the year The Heart of a Woman opens, Angelou had appeared in an off-Broadway revue that inspired her first film, Calypso Heat Wave, in which Angelou sang and performed her own compositions, something she does not mention in the book. Also in 1957 and not discussed in the book, her first album, Miss Calypso, was released; it was reissued as a CD in 1995. According to Als, Angelou sang and performed calypso music because it was popular at the time, and not to develop as an artist. As described in The Heart of a Woman, Angelou eventually gave up performing for a career as a writer and poet. According to Chuck Foster, who wrote the liner notes in Miss Calypso's 1995 reissue, her calypso music career is "given short shrift" and dismissed in the book. (Note: See Angelou (1981), p. 55.)

=== Title ===
The heart of a woman goes forth with the dawn,

As a lone bird, soft winging, so restlessly on,
Afar o'er life's turrets and vales does it roam
In the wake of those echoes the heart calls home.

The heart of a woman falls back with the night,
And enters some alien cage in its plight,
And tries to forget it has dreamed of the stars
While it breaks, breaks, breaks on the sheltering bars.

-— "The Heart of a Woman", by Georgia Douglas Johnson

Angelou takes the title of her fourth autobiography from a poem by Georgia Douglas Johnson, a Harlem Renaissance writer. Critic Lyman B. Hagan states that although the title is "less striking or oblique than titles of her preceding books," it is appropriate because Johnson's poem mentions a caged bird and provides a connection to Angelou's first autobiography, whose title was taken from a poem by Paul Laurence Dunbar. The title suggests Angelou's painful loneliness and exposes a spiritual dilemma also present in her first volume. Johnson's use of the metaphor is different from Dunbar's because her bird is a female whose isolation is sexual rather than racial. The caged bird may also refer to Angelou after her failed marriage, but writer Mary Jane Lupton says that "the Maya Angelou of The Heart of a Woman is too strong and too self-determined to be kept in a cage".

The Heart of a Woman is the first time Angelou identifies with another female African-American writer. Her early literary influences were men, including James Weldon Johnson, Paul Laurence Dunbar, and William Shakespeare. Angelou has stated that she always admired women writers like Anne Spencer, Jessie Fauset, Nella Larsen, and Zora Neale Hurston. Her choice of title for this book is an acknowledgment of her legacy as a Black woman writer.

== Synopsis ==
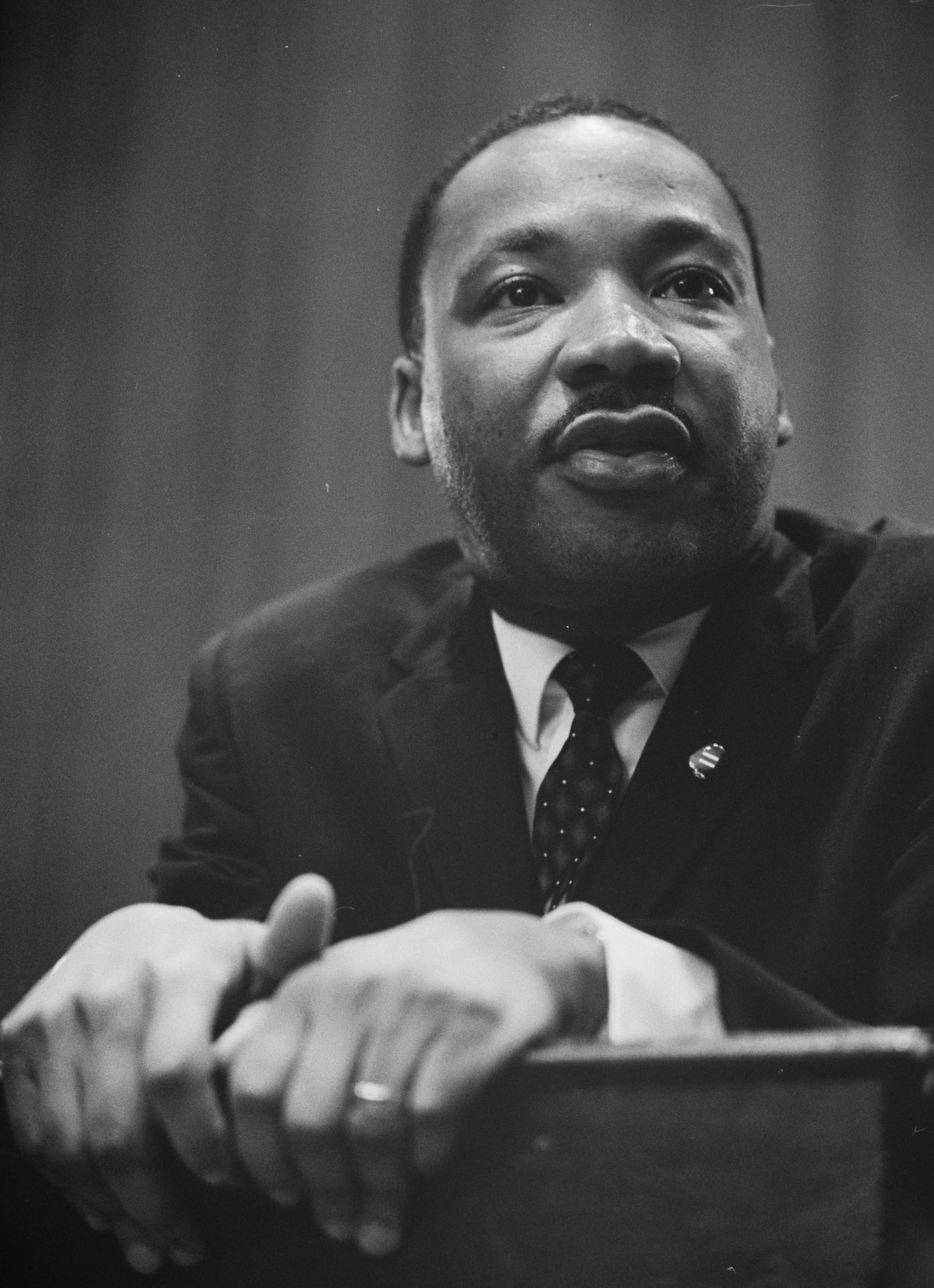
Angelou describes her work for Dr. Martin Luther King Jr.'s Southern Christian Leadership Conference in The Heart of a Woman.

The events described in The Heart of a Woman take place between 1957 and 1962, beginning shortly after the end of Angelou's previous autobiography, Singin' and Swingin' and Gettin' Merry Like Christmas. Angelou and her teenage son Guy have moved into a houseboat commune in Sausalito, California. After a year, they move to a rented house near San Francisco. Singer Billie Holiday visits Angelou and her son there, and Holiday sings "Strange Fruit", her famous song about the lynching of Black men, to Guy. Holiday tells Angelou, "You're going to be famous. But it won't be for singing." In 1959, Angelou and Guy moved to New York City. The transition is difficult for Guy, and Angelou is forced to protect him from a gang leader. No longer satisfied with performing in nightclubs, she dedicates herself to acting, writing, political organizing, and her son. Her friend, novelist John Killens, invites her to join the Harlem Writers Guild. She meets other important African-American artists and writers, including James Baldwin, who would become her mentor. She becomes a published writer for the first time.

Angelou becomes more politically active and participates in African-American and African protest rallies, including helping to organize a sit-in at the United Nations following the execution of Patrice Lumumba, the ousted prime minister of the Democratic Republic of the Congo. She meets Malcolm X and is struck by his good looks and magnetism. After hearing Martin Luther King Jr. speak, she and her friend, activist Godfrey Cambridge, are inspired to produce a successful fundraising event for King's Southern Christian Leadership Conference (SCLC) called Cabaret For Freedom. King names her coordinator of SCLC's office in New York. She performs in Jean Genet's play The Blacks, with Roscoe Lee Brown, James Earl Jones, and Cicely Tyson.

In 1961, Angelou meets South African freedom fighter Vusumzi Make. (Note: According to scholar Lyman B. Hagen, Angelou's friend Julian Mayfield writes a fictionalized account of Angelou's relationship with Make, which Angelou never condemned.) Angelou and Make never marry, but she and Guy move with Make to London and Cairo, where she acts as his political wife while he is in exile. Their relationship is full of cultural conflicts; he expects her to be a subservient African wife, and she yearns for the freedom of a working woman. She learns that Make is too friendly with other women and is irresponsible with money, so she accepts a position as assistant editor at the Arab Observer. Their relationship is examined by their community of friends, and Angelou and Make eventually separate. Angelou accepts a job in Liberia, and she and Guy travel to Accra, where he has been accepted to attend college. Guy is seriously injured in an automobile accident, so she begins working at the University of Ghana and remains there while he recuperates. The Heart of a Woman ends with Guy leaving for college and Angelou remarking to herself, "At last, I'll be able to eat the whole breast of a roast chicken by myself."

== Genre ==
All seven of Angelou's installments of her life story are in the tradition of African-American autobiography. Starting with I Know Why the Caged Bird Sings, Angelou challenges the usual structure of the autobiography by critiquing, changing, and expanding the genre. Angelou said in 1989 that she is the only serious writer to choose autobiography to express herself, but she reports not one person's story, but the collective's. Scholar Selwyn R. Cudjoe writes that Angelou is representative of the convention in African-American autobiography as a public gesture that speaks for an entire group of people. Her use of devices common in fictional writing, such as dialog, characterization and thematic development, has led some reviewers to categorize her books as autobiographical fiction.

All of Angelou's autobiographies conform to the autobiography's standard structure: they are written by a single author, they are chronological, and they contain elements of character, technique, and theme. In a 1983 interview with literature critic Claudia Tate, Angelou calls her books autobiographies, and later acknowledges that she follows the slave narrative tradition of "speaking in the first-person singular talking about the first-person plural, always saying 'I' meaning 'we'". Lupton compares The Heart of a Woman with other autobiographies, and states that for the first time in Angelou's series, she is able to present herself as a model for successful living. However, Angelou's "woman's heart"—her perspective as a woman with concerns about her self-esteem and the conflicts with her lovers and her son—is what makes her autobiography different. Angelou's feelings as described in The Heart of a Woman, which Lupton calls Angelou's "most introspective" book, are what dictates the book's form.

Angelou recognizes that there are fictional aspects to all her books, which differentiate her work from more traditional "truthful" autobiographies. Her approach parallels the conventions of many African-American autobiographies written during the abolitionist period in the US when truth was often censored for purposes of self-protection. Lyman B. Hagen places Angelou in the tradition of African-American autobiography, but insists that she has created a unique interpretation of the autobiographical form. In a 1998 interview with journalist George Plimpton, Angelou discusses her writing process, and "the sometimes slippery notion of truth in nonfiction" and memoirs. When asked if she changed the truth to improve her story, she states, "Sometimes I make a diameter from a composite of three or four people, because the essence in only one person is not sufficiently strong to be written about." Angelou has never admitted to changing the facts in her stories. Hagen states, "One can assume that 'the essence of the data' is present in Angelou's work", and that Angelou uses aspects of fiction writing to make her depictions of events and people more interesting. Angelou's long-time editor, Robert Loomis, said that she could rewrite any of her books by changing the order of her facts to make a different impact on the reader.

The Heart of a Woman is similar to Angelou's previous volumes because it is narrated from the intimate point of view of a woman and a mother, but by this time, she can refer to events that occurred in her past books. Angelou has become a serial autobiographer, something Lupton calls "a narrative structure unsurpassed in American autobiography". Angelou successfully draws upon her previous works, and can build upon the themes she has already explored; for example, Angelou threatens the gang leader who has been threatening her son, a powerful incident when considered in light of Angelou's rape in I Know Why the Caged Bird Sings. Lupton calls Angelou's violent behavior an "unconscious effort to rewrite her own history".

== Style ==
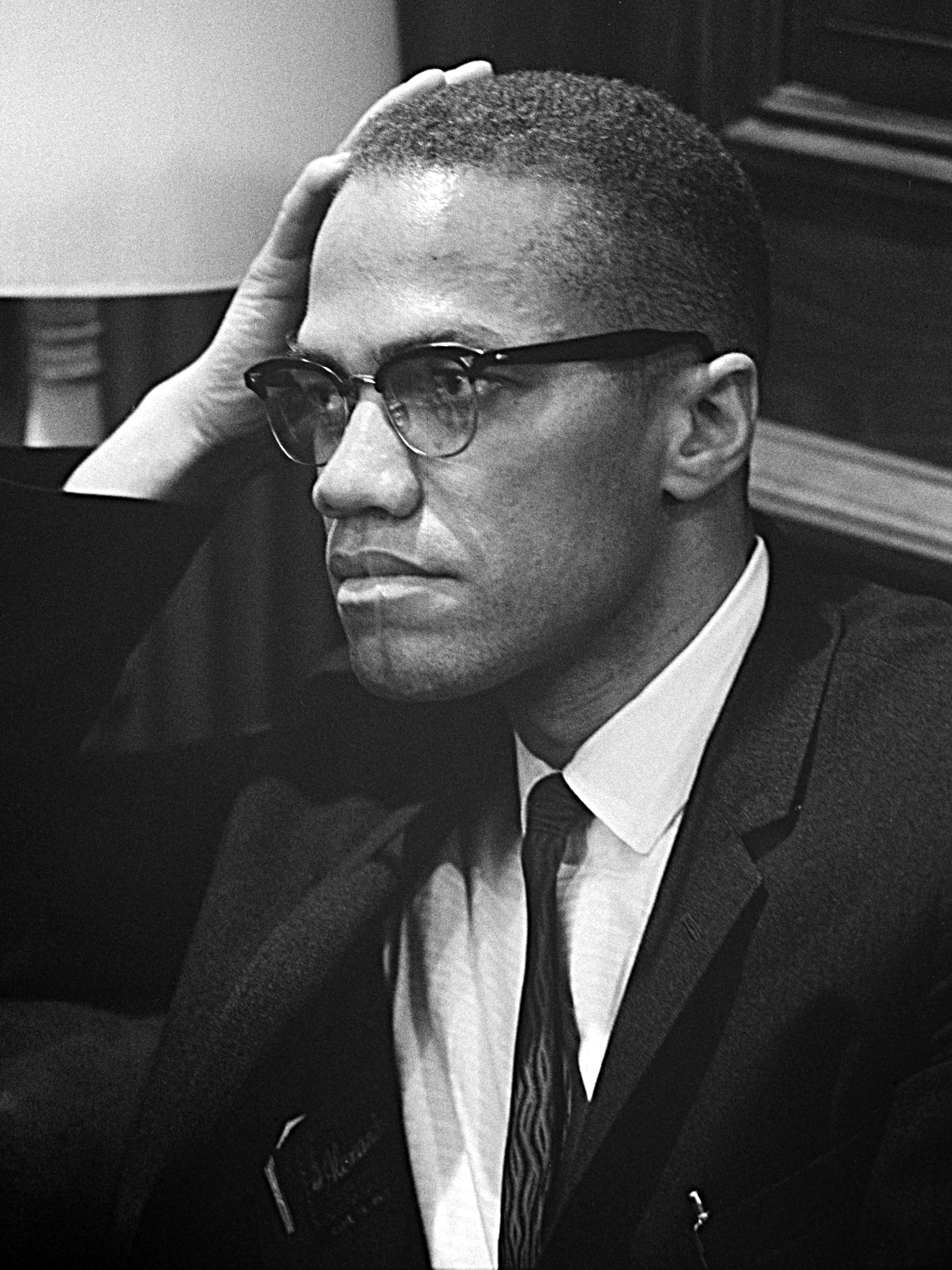
Angelou describes her impressions of Malcolm X (March 1964) in The Heart of a Woman.

Angelou does not begin to create her own narrative until The Heart of a Woman, which depends less upon the conventions of fiction than her previous books. For example, there is less dialog and fewer dramatic episodes. The Heart of a Woman is more uplifting than its predecessors due to Angelou's resolution of her conflict between her duties as a mother and her success as a performer.

Angelou perfects the use of the vignette in The Heart of a Woman to present her acquaintances and close associates. Two of her most developed vignettes in this book are of Billie Holiday and Malcolm X. The vignettes of those she knew well, like Vusumzi Make, also present her interactions and relationships. Hagen writes that although "frank talk seemed to be almost requisite for a commercially successful book" in the early 1980s, Angelou values monogamy, fidelity, and commitment in her relationships.

For the only time in this series, Angelou describes her son's accident in detail at both the end of this book and the beginning of her next one, All God's Children Need Traveling Shoes, a technique that centralizes the two books, connects them with each other, creates a strong, emotional link between them, and repeats Angelou's pattern of ending each book on a positive note. In this book, Angelou ends with a hopeful look to the future as her son attains his independence and she looks forward to hers. Hagen writes, "Faithful to the ongoing themes of survival, sense of self, and continuing education, The Heart of a Woman moves its central figures to a point of full personhood."

== Themes ==
=== Race ===
Race, like in the rest of the series, is a central theme in The Heart of a Woman. The book opens with Angelou and Guy living in an experimental commune with white people, trying to participate in the new openness between Blacks and whites. She is not completely comfortable with the arrangement; Angelou never names her roommates, even though "naming" has been an important theme in her books thus far. For the most part, Angelou is able to get along well with whites, but she occasionally encounters prejudice, as when she needs help from white friends to rent a home in a segregated neighborhood. Hagen calls Angelou's descriptions of whites and the hopes for eventual equality in this book "optimistic". Angelou continues her indictment of white power structure and her protests against racial injustice.

Angelou becomes more politicized and develops a new sense of Black identity. Even Angelou's decision to leave show business is political. She sees herself as a social and cultural historian of her time, and of the civil rights and Black literary movement of the late 1950s and early 1960s. She becomes more attracted to the causes of Black militants in the US and Africa, to the point of entering into a relationship with a significant militant, and becomes more committed to activism. During this time, she becomes an active political protester, but she does not think of herself in that way. She places the focus upon herself and uses the autobiographical form to demonstrate how the civil rights movement influenced her. According to Hagen, Angelou's contributions to civil rights as a fundraiser and SCLC organizer were successful and "eminently effective".

=== Journey ===
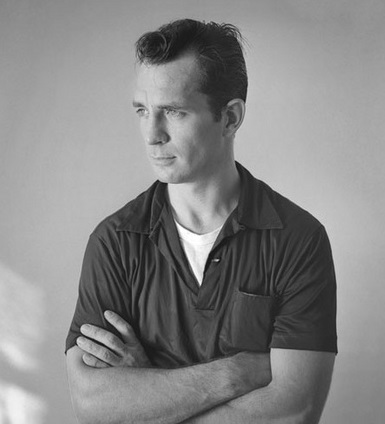
Jack Kerouac, 1956. Angelou's themes of journey in The Heart of a Woman parallel Kerouac's themes in his novel On the Road.

Travel is a common theme in American autobiography as a whole; McPherson writes that it is something of a national myth to Americans as a people. This is also the case for African-American autobiography, which has its roots in the slave narrative. The Heart of a Woman has three primary settings—the San Francisco Bay Area, New York, and Egypt—and two secondary ones—London and Accra.

Like all of Angelou's books, the structure of The Heart of a Woman is based on a journey. Angelou emphasizes the theme of movement by opening her book with a spiritual ("The ole ark's a-moverin'"), which McPherson calls "the theme song of the United States in 1957". This spiritual, which contains a reference to Noah's Ark, presents Angelou as a type of Noah and demonstrates her spirituality. Angelou mentions Allen Ginsberg and Jack Kerouac's 1951 novel On the Road, thus connecting her own journey and uncertainty about the future with the journeys of literary figures. Even though Angelou travels to Africa for a relationship, she makes a connection with the continent. Lupton states, "Africa is the site of her growth". Angelou's time in Africa makes her more aware of her African roots as she searches for the past of her ancestors. Although Angelou journeys to many places in the book, the most important journey she describes is "a voyage into the self".

=== Writing ===
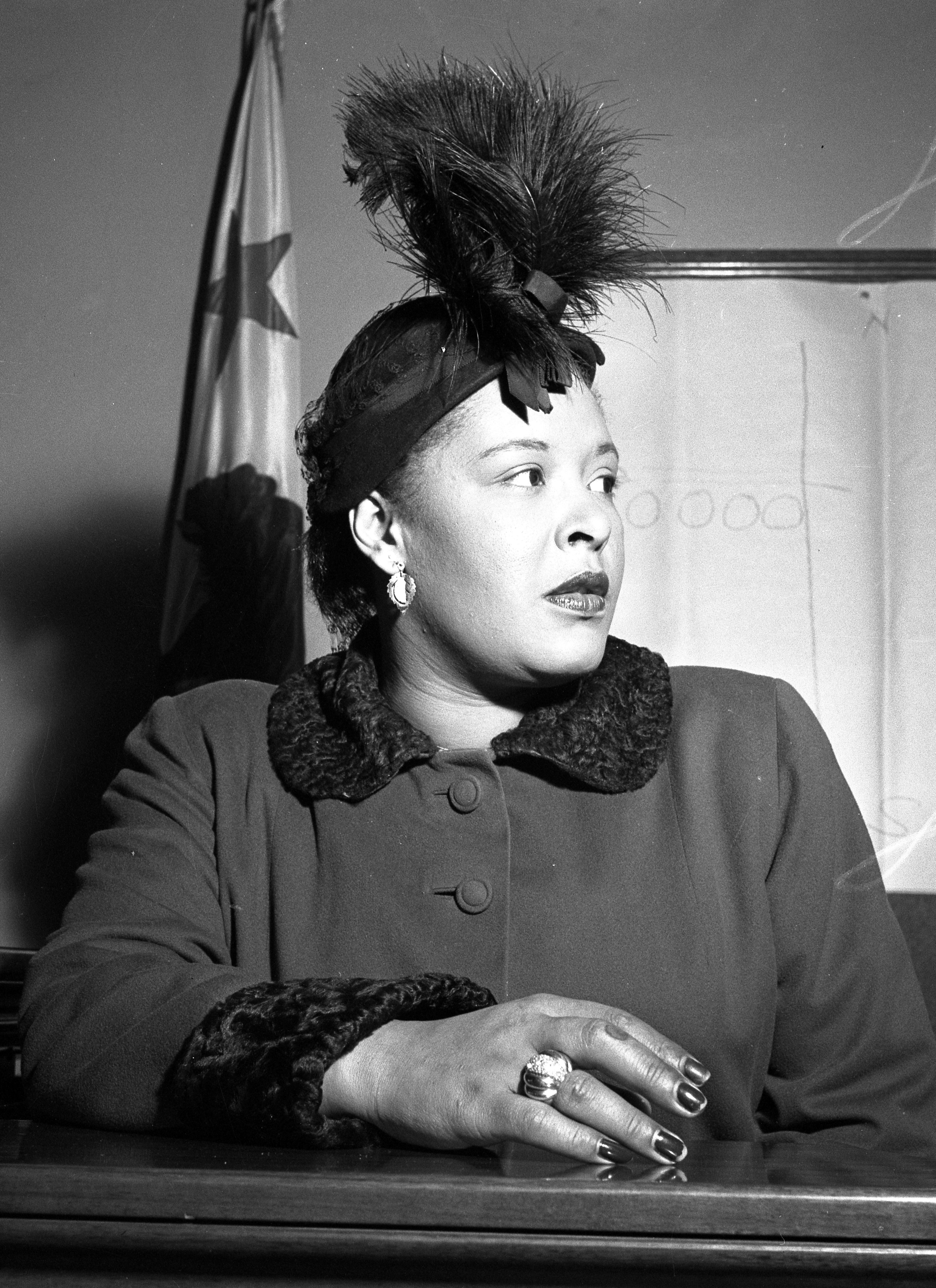
Billie Holiday, 1949. Holiday tells Angelou in The Heart of a Woman, "You're going to be famous. But it won't be for singing."

Angelou's primary role in Singin' and Swingin' and Gettin' Merry Like Christmas was stage performer, but in The Heart of a Woman she changes from someone who uses others' method of expression—the songs and dances of the African, Caribbean, and African-American oral tradition—to a writer. Angelou makes this decision for political reasons as she becomes more involved with the civil rights movement, and so that she can care for her son. For the first time in Angelou's autobiographies, she begins to think of herself as a writer and recounts her literary development. Angelou begins to identify with other Black women writers for the first time in The Heart of a Woman. She has been influenced by several writers since her childhood, but this is the first time she mentions female authors. Up to this point, her identification has been with male writers; her new affiliations with female writers is due to her emerging feminism.

Angelou's concept of herself as an artist changed after her encounter with Billie Holiday. Up to that point, Angelou's career was more about fame than about art; Als states, "Developing her artistry was not the point". Als also says that Angelou's busy career, instead of revealing her ambition, shows "a woman who is only moderately talented and perpetually unable to understand who she is". Angelou, in spite of the mistakes of her youth, needed the approval and acceptance of others, and observes that Holiday was able to perceive this. Holiday tells her, "You're going to be famous. But it won't be for singing."

Angelou had begun to write sketches, songs and short stories, and shows her work to her friend John Killens, who invites her to New York City to develop her writing skills. She joins the Harlem Writers Guild and receives feedback from other African-American authors such as Killens, Rosa Guy, and Caribbean writer Paule Marshall, who would eventually make significant contributions to African-American literature. Angelou dedicates herself to improving her craft, forcing herself to understand the technical aspects of writing. Lupton writes, "Readers can actually envision in this volume the distinguished artist who becomes the Maya Angelou of the 1990s".

=== Motherhood ===
Motherhood, a theme throughout Angelou's autobiographies, becomes more complex in The Heart of a Woman. Although Guy struggles with the developmentally appropriate process of adolescent separation from his mother, they remain close. Many years of experience as a mother, and her success as a writer, actress, and activist, enable Angelou to behave more competently and with more maturity, professionally and as a mother. Her self-assurance becomes a major part of her personality. Her past conflict between her professional and personal lives are resolved, and she fulfills her promise to Guy she made to him at the end of her previous autobiography that they would never be separated again. Lupton writes that Angelou resolves this conflict by subordinating her needs to her child's.

Lupton also writes that motherhood is important in Angelou's books, as is "the motif of the responsible mother". Angelou's commitment to caring for her son is revealed in her confrontation with the street gang leader who has threatened Guy. In this episode, which Lupton considers the most dramatic in the book, Angelou has become a powerful mother. Angelou is no longer torn by self-doubt, but is now a strong and aggressive Black mother. Angelou has become what Joanne Braxton calls the "outraged mother", which represents the Black mother's strength and dedication found throughout slave narratives. Lupton also writes that Angelou has become a reincarnation of her grandmother, a central figure in Caged Bird.

By the end of The Heart of a Woman, Angelou is alone; for example, after Guy recuperates from the car accident, he leaves her to attend college. The final word in the book is the negative "myself", a word that signifies Angelou's new-found freedom and independence. Angelou has become truly herself and is no longer defined as someone's wife or mother. Scholar Wallis Tinnie calls this moment one of "illusive transcendence" and "a scene of hope and completion". For the first time in many years, Angelou will be able to eat a chicken breast alone, something that is valued throughout her books. Lupton calls this thought "perfectly formed". Tinnie states that The Heart of a Woman's "lonely aching" hearkens back to the poem that inspired the book's title.

== Critical reception and sales ==
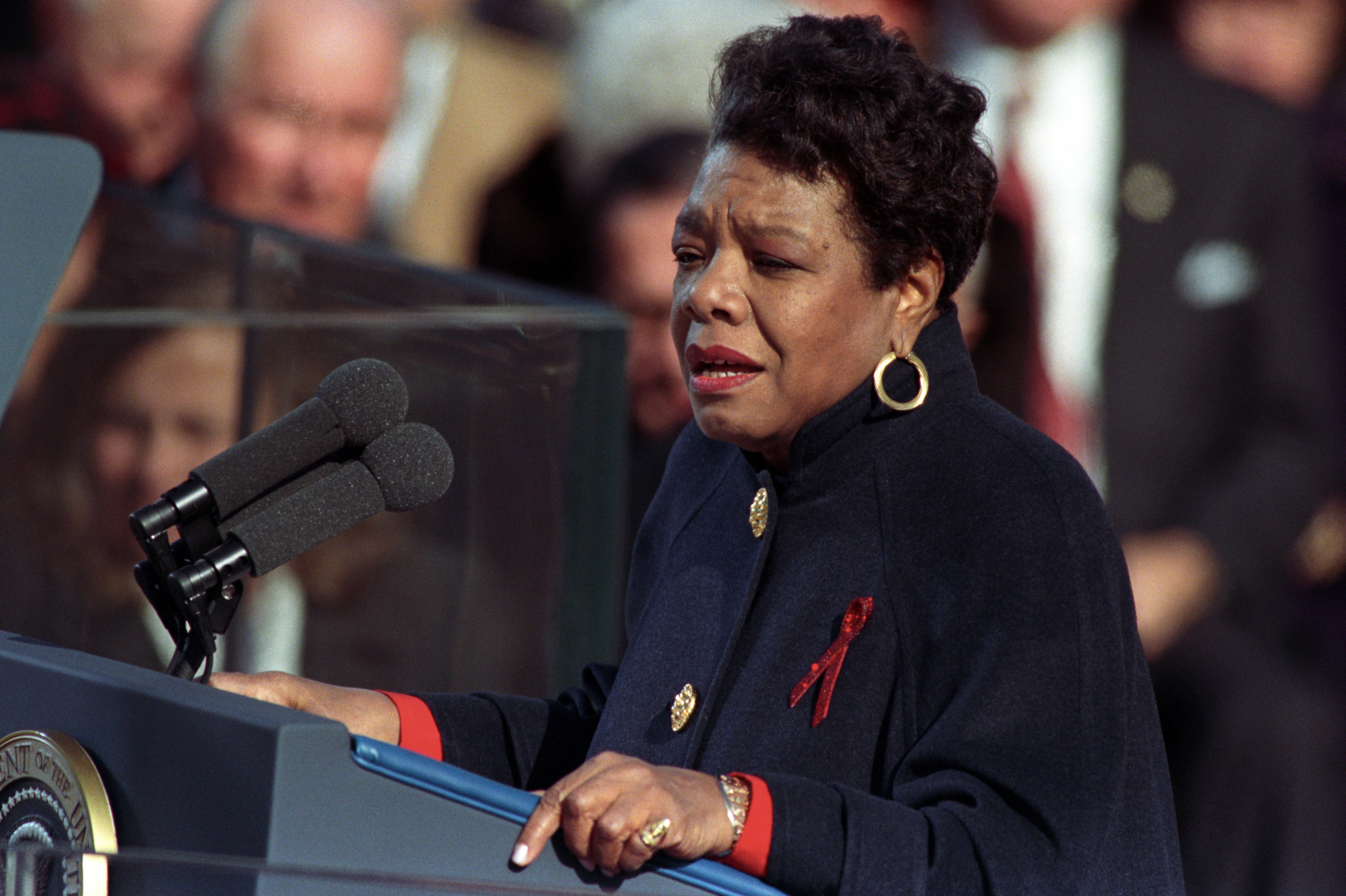
Maya Angelou reciting her poem "On the Pulse of Morning" at President Bill Clinton's inauguration in 1993

Critics gave The Heart of a Woman positive reviews, praising its professional qualities. The American Library Association's Choice magazine says that although Caged Bird was the best of Angelou's autobiographies, "every book since has been very much worth the reading and pondering". Janet B. Blundell writes that the book was "lively, revealing, and worth the reading", but also found it "too chatty and anecdotal". Hagen responded to this criticism by stating that all of Angelou's books consist of episodes connected by theme and character. Sheree Crute, writing for Ms., appreciated the episodic nature of Angelou's writing and praised her for her "wonderfully unaffected story telling skills". Cudjoe called it "the most political segment of Angelou's autobiographical statement".

In 1993, Angelou recited her poem "On the Pulse of Morning" at President Bill Clinton's inauguration; in the following week, sales of her works, including The Heart of a Woman, rose by 300–600 percent. Bantam Books printed 400,000 copies of her books to meet demand. Random House, which published Angelou's hardcover books and the poem later that year, reported that they sold more of her books in January 1993 than they did in all of 1992, marking a 1,200 percent increase. In 1997, Angelou's friend Oprah Winfrey named The Heart of a Woman as a selection in her book club, making it a bestseller and increasing its total printing to over one million copies, sixteen years after its publication.

== Works cited ==
- Angelou, Maya (1981). The Heart of a Woman. New York: Random House. ISBN 978-0-8129-8032-5
- Cudjoe, Selwyn R. (1984). "Maya Angelou and the Autobiographical Statement" in Mari Evans (ed.), Black Women Writers (1950–1980): A Critical Evaluation. New York: Doubleday. ISBN 978-0-385-17124-3
- Hagen, Lyman B. (1997). Heart of a Woman, Mind of a Writer, and Soul of a Poet: A Critical Analysis of the Writings of Maya Angelou. Lanham, Maryland: University Press. ISBN 978-0-7618-0621-9
- Lupton, Mary Jane (1998). Maya Angelou: A Critical Companion. Westport, Connecticut: Greenwood Press. ISBN 978-0-313-30325-8
- Lupton, Mary Jane (1999). "Singing the Black Mother: Maya Angelou and Autobiographical Continuity" in Joanne M. Braxton (ed.), Maya Angelou's I Know Why the Caged Bird Sings: A Casebook. New York: Oxford University Press. ISBN 978-0-19-511606-9
- McPherson, Dolly A. (1990). Order Out of Chaos: The Autobiographical Works of Maya Angelou. New York: Peter Lang Publishing. ISBN 978-0-8204-1139-2
