= Miss Calypso =

Studio album by Maya Angelou
- Released: 1957
- Recorded: 1956–1957
- Genre: Calypso
- Labels: Liberty 1957; Scamp 1996 (CD reissue)
- Producer: Walter Kerr

Miss Calypso is the only album by the American writer and poet Maya Angelou, released in 1957. The album was released during a craze for calypso music catalyzed by Harry Belafonte the previous year. Angelou sang every song on the album, and she composed four of them. Behind Angelou's voice, studio guitarist Tommy Tedesco and percussionist Al Bello created an exotic mood. Angelou toured in support of the album, performing calypso songs in nightclubs. The album was a modest success but Angelou did not make any further records as a singer.

Angelou later gained fame as an author and a poet, most notably her first autobiography, I Know Why the Caged Bird Sings. In her fourth autobiography, The Heart of a Woman, she downplays her singing career and assigns little importance to Miss Calypso. In 1995, the album was re-released as a CD during a period of customer interest in 1950s exotica. Its artistry was re-examined in light of Angelou's later fame; it was said to exemplify the calypso music of the period, spiced with a feeling for the tradition's roots.

== Background ==
Maya Angelou had modest success as a singer, dancer, and performer beginning in 1954, when her marriage to her first husband, Tosh Angelos, ended. She performed in clubs around San Francisco, including the Purple Onion, where she sang and danced calypso music. Up to that point she went by her birth name Marguerite Johnson, or by the name Rita, but at the strong suggestion of her managers and supporters, she changed her professional name to "Maya Angelou", a "distinctive name" that set her apart and captured the feel of her calypso dance performances.

During 1954 and 1955, Angelou toured 22 countries, mostly in Europe, with a production of the opera Porgy and Bess, which she describes in her third autobiography, Singin' and Swingin' and Gettin' Merry Like Christmas (1976). By February 1956, she was touring with her own new show, an exotic calypso act which played at the Keyboard in Beverly Hills, where she was "wooed by disk executives", according to Billboard. She headlined at the Village Vanguard in March, gigged for four weeks at the Clouds in Honolulu in July–August, and joined the Lester Horton dancers for a Halloween show at the Palladium. Angelou signed with Liberty Records in September. By November 1956, Variety was describing the process of recording her first album, Miss Calypso, and even speculating that her second album might be a collection of Noël Coward songs, based on her playful ad-libbing of a Coward tune between takes at the recording studio.

In 1957, Angelou appeared in an off-Broadway revue that inspired her first film, Calypso Heat Wave, in which Angelou sang and performed her own compositions. Also in 1957, the album Miss Calypso was completed and released; it was reissued as a CD in 1995. According to reviewer Hilton Als, Angelou sang and performed calypso because she "had followed the fashion of the time", and not to develop as an artist. Als states about Miss Calypso: "But it was clear that the album itself was not the point. Developing her artistry was not the point. Fame, not art, was her spur..." In 1958, Angelou met jazz singer Billie Holiday, who after walking out during one of Angelou's calypso performances, told her, "You're going to be famous. But it won't be for singing".

As she described in her fourth autobiography The Heart of a Woman, Angelou eventually gave up performing for a writing career, and became a poet and writer. According to Chuck Foster, who wrote the liner notes in the album's 1995 reissue, her calypso music career is "given short shrift" and dismissed in the book. Her first autobiography, I Know Why the Caged Bird Sings (1969), brought her international recognition and acclaim.

== Artwork ==
Richie Unterberger of AllMusic described the album's cover as featuring Angelou "draped in a slip of a red dress, gyrating next to a fire in the middle of a (almost definitely fake) jungle". After finding it in a used record bin in 1994, Chuck Foster featured the cover in his column in Beat Magazine. Foster considered the cover as one of the best examples of the calypso era. He described the cover art in this way: "A barely draped young Maya gyrates around a bonfire from which the flaming title emerges".

== Reviews ==
Miss Calypso was a modest success. Billboard's review of the album said, "[Although] calypso addicts will question the authenticity of this package, Miss Angelou has enough sell in her voice to offer dealers a promising set. Selections include such oldies as "Run Joe", "Stone Cold Dead in the Market", and "Calypso Blues", all of which are handled with finesse. Singer's name value is a rising commodity via her nitery dates, and should increase some as a result of this wax".

Unterberger wrote that the 1995 reissue of the album was "probably motivated by the exotica-space age pop revival". He called the album's music "more or less straight-ahead pop-calypso" that was "not that strange or cheesy". He complimented Angelou's performance, saying that she "sung with respectable gutsiness", and compared the album to Harry Belafonte's calypso recordings of the same era.

Variety reviewed one of Angelou's live calypso performances, a gig in Chicago at Mr. Kelly's nightclub during much of December 1956. Hal Spector quoted the review in the album's 1957 liner notes. Stef, the Variety reviewer, called Angelou's act "sizzling" and a "unique creation in the jazz world when everything progressive is expected to be on the cool side". He called the song "Polymon Bongo" "recitative" and complimented its conversational nature with the drums. He commented on the intimacy and sharpness in Angelou's performance of "The Heat is On", a song she wrote but one that does not appear on the album. He called "Calypso Blues", written by Nat King Cole and Don George, "an artfully simple welding of idioms" and another song she composed, "Scandal in the Family", "standard Trinidad calypso stuff" and reported that her performance of it "rocked the house".

Spector, also in the album's 1957 liner notes, reported on another of Angelou's concerts in the Beverly Hills nightclub The Keyboard, when she performed many of the songs on Miss Calypso. He called her a polite, soft-spoken, calm, and poised young woman "that completely mystified the audience". He found that Angelou's performance made an indelible impression and that she had an unusual voice and striking appearance. Spector stated, "She had captured the audience swiftly and effectively with her calm and affectionate manner", and promised that she would do the same for listeners of the album. He also predicted that she was "destined to become a very big name in show business". Spector characterized Angelou's music as "calypso style with a liberal sprinkling of Afro-Cuban, and a dash of blues mixed together with delicate jazz".

Foster, in the album's liner notes its 1995 reissue, called the music "fresh as the day it was recorded and entirely captivating", but that it followed the tradition of the calypso of its era. He described the album's genre as having "Jazz, Afro-Cuban rhythms, Odetta-style folk", with "gospel and blues voicings and Belafonte-influenced Caribbean flavors". Foster considered Tommy Tedesco's guitar and Al Bello's percussion as having a "Beat-era spiritual sound". He thought that Angelou brought out the best in the calypso standards "Peas and Rice" and "Run Joe", but that she reached her peak with "Scandal in the Family", all of which he found as authentic as the songs she wrote. He stated that two of the songs Angelou wrote, "Mambo in Africa" and "Neighbor, Neighbor", effectively combined her skills as a poet and composer. He compared her music with other calypso artists of the same era, but considered hers more "uptown" and more like the music of modern artists such as Tracy Chapman. Foster also compared Angelou's music in Miss Calypso with her later writing, and called both "hot and spicy, peppered with a roots flavoring". Jessica Letkemann of Billboard stated that Angelou's tuneful and distinctive voice would "serve her so well in later years as a spoken word artist".

== Track listing ==
No.	Title	Writer(s)	Length
1.	"Run Joe"	Louis Jordan; Walter Merrick; Joe Willoughby	2:28
2.	"Oo-Dla-Ba-Doo"	Maya Angelou	1:00
3.	"Scandal in the Family"	Sir Lancelot	2:41
4.	"Mambo in Africa"	Angelou	1:37
5.	"Since Me Man Has Done Gone and Went"	Merrick	1:48
6.	"Polymon Bongo"	Edward White	1:58
7.	"Neighbor, Neighbor"	Angelou	2:13
8.	"Donkey City"	King Radio	2:58
9.	"Stone Cold Dead in the Market"	Wilmoth Houdini	2:06
10.	"Calypso Blues"	Nat King Cole; Don George	3:08
11.	"Tamo"	Angelou	1:59
12.	"Peas and Rice"	Milt Larkin	2:33
13.	"Flo and Joe"	Milton Leeds; Ted Varnick	2:02
14.	"Push Ka Pici Pi"	Jordan; Merrick; Willoughby	2:40

== Personnel ==
- Maya Angelou – composer, vocals
- Al Bello – bongos, congas, drums
- Tommy Tedesco – guitar
- Pete Ciccone – art direction
- Alan Douches – digital remastering
- Chuck Foster – annotation, liner notes
- Walter Kerr – producer
- John Kraus – engineer
- Ashley Warren – reissue coordinator

== Works cited ==
- Angelou, Maya. (1981). The Heart of a Woman. New York: Random House. ISBN 978-0-8129-8032-5
- Gillespie, Marcia Ann, Rosa Johnson Butler, and Richard A. Long. (2008). Maya Angelou: A Glorious Celebration. New York: Random House. ISBN 978-0-385-51108-7
