= Gather Together in My Name =

1974 memoir by Maya Angelou

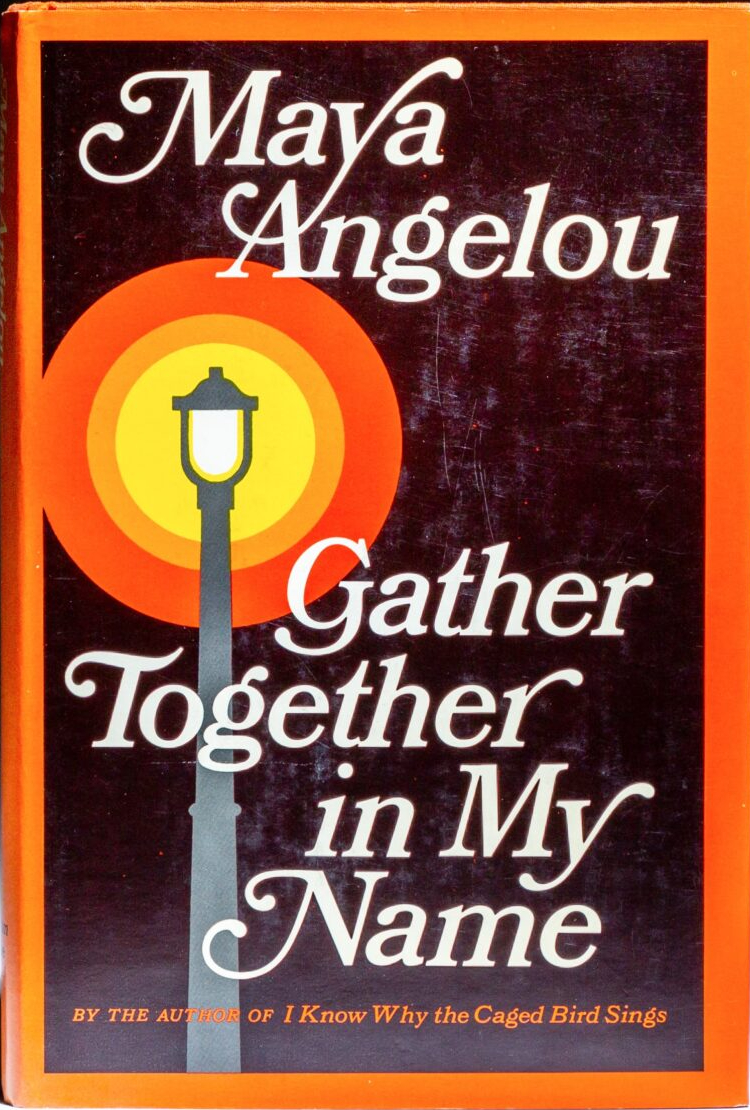
- Author: Maya Angelou
- Language: English
- Genre: Autobiography
- Published: 1974 (Random House), 1st edition
- Publication place: United States
- Media type: Print (hardback & paperback)
- Pages: 214 pp (Hardcover 1st edition)
- ISBN: 0-394-48692-7 (hardcover 1st edition)
- OCLC: 797780
- Dewey Decimal: 917.3/06/96073 B
- LC Class: PS3551.N464 Z464 1974
- Preceded by: I Know Why the Caged Bird Sings
- Followed by: Singin' and Swingin' and Gettin' Merry like Christmas

Gather Together in My Name is a 1974 memoir by American writer and poet Maya Angelou. It is the second book in Angelou's series of seven autobiographies. Written three years after the publication of and beginning immediately following the events described in I Know Why the Caged Bird Sings, it follows Angelou, called Rita, from the ages of 17 to 19. The title is taken from the Bible, but also conveys how one Black female lived in the white-dominated society of the U.S. following World War II.

Angelou expands upon many themes that she started discussing in her first autobiography, including motherhood and family, racism, identity, education and literacy. Rita becomes closer to her mother in this book, and goes through a variety of jobs and relationships as she tries to provide for her young son and find her place in the world. Angelou continues to discuss racism in Gather Together, but moves from speaking for all Black women to describing how one young woman dealt with it. The book exhibits the narcissism of young people, but describes how Rita discovers her identity. Like many of Angelou's autobiographies, Gather Together is concerned with Angelou's on-going self-education.

Gather Together was not as critically acclaimed as Angelou's first autobiography, but received mostly positive reviews and was recognized as being better written than its predecessor. The book's structure, consisting of a series of episodes tied together by theme and content, parallels the chaos of adolescence, which some critics feel makes it an unsatisfactory sequel to Caged Bird. Rita's many physical movements throughout the book, which affects the book's organization and quality, has caused at least one critic to call it a travel narrative.

== Background ==
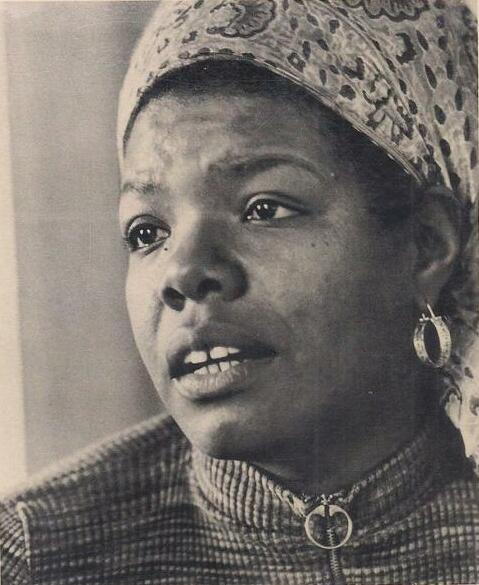
Portrait of Angelou from the first edition of Gather Together

Gather Together in My Name, published in 1974, is Maya Angelou's second book in her series of seven autobiographies and was written three years after her first autobiography, I Know Why the Caged Bird Sings. In 1971, Angelou published her first volume of poetry, Just Give Me a Cool Drink of Water 'fore I Diiie (1971), which became a bestseller and was nominated for a Pulitzer Prize. It was Angelou's early practice to alternate a prose volume with a poetry volume. In 1993, Angelou recited her poem "On the Pulse of Morning" at the inauguration of Bill Clinton, becoming the first poet to make an inaugural recitation since Robert Frost's "The Gift Outright" at the inauguration of John F. Kennedy in 1961. Through the writing of this autobiography and her life stories in all of her books, Angelou became recognized and highly respected as a spokesperson for Blacks and women. According to scholar Joanne Braxton, it made her "without a doubt ... America's most visible black woman autobiographer".

=== Title ===
The title of Gather Together is inspired by Matthew 18:19–20: "Again I say unto you, That if two of you shall agree on earth as touching any thing that they shall ask, it shall be done for them of my Father which is in heaven. For where two or three are gathered together in my name, there am I in the midst of them" (King James Version). While Angelou acknowledged the title's biblical origin, she also stated that the title counteracted the tendency of many adults to lie to their children about their pasts. Scholar Sondra O'Neale states that the title is "a New Testament injunction for the traveling soul to pray and commune while waiting patiently for deliverance". Critic Selwyn R. Cudjoe agrees: "The incidents in the book appear merely gathered together in the name of Maya Angelou"

Critic Hilton Als believes that the title of Gather Together may reflect its theme of how one Black woman was able to survive in the wider context of post-war America while also speaking for all Black women, and how they survived in a white-dominated society.

== Plot summary ==
The book opens in the years following World War II. Angelou, still known as "Marguerite", or "Rita", has just given birth to her son Clyde, and is living with her mother and stepfather in San Francisco. The book follows Marguerite from the ages of 17 to 19, through a series of relationships, occupations, and cities as she attempts to raise her son and to find her place in the world. It continues exploring the themes of Angelou's isolation and loneliness begun in her first volume, and the ways she overcomes racism, sexism, and her continued victimization.

Rita goes from job to job and from relationship to relationship, hoping that "my charming prince was going to appear out of the blue". "My fantasies were little different than any other girl of my age", Angelou wrote. "He would come. He would. Just walk into my life, see me and fall everlastingly in love ... I looked forward to a husband who would love me ethereally, spiritually, and on rare (but beautiful) occasions, physically".

Some important events occur throughout the book while Rita tries to care for herself and her son. In San Diego, Rita becomes an absentee manager for two lesbian prostitutes. When threatened with incarceration and with losing her son for her illegal activities, she and Clyde escape to her grandmother's home in Stamps, Arkansas. Her grandmother sends them to San Francisco for their safety and protection after physically punishing Rita for confronting two white women in a department store. This event demonstrates their different and irreconcilable attitudes about race, paralleling events in Angelou's first book. Back with her mother in San Francisco, Rita attempts to enlist in the Army, only to be rejected during the height of the Red Scare because she had attended the California Labor School as a young teenager.

Another event of note described in the book was, in spite of "the strangest audition", her short stint dancing and studying dance with her partner, R. L. Poole, who became her lover until he reunited with his previous partner, ending Rita's show business career for the time being.

A turning point in the book occurs when Rita falls in love with a gambler named L. D. Tolbrook, who seduces Rita and introduces her to prostitution. Her mother's hospitalization and death of her brother Bailey's wife drives Rita to her mother's home. She leaves her young son with a caretaker, Big Mary, but when she returns for him, she finds that Big Mary had disappeared with Clyde. She tries to elicit help from Tolbrook, who puts her in her place when she finds him at his home and requests that he help her find her son. She finally realizes that he had been taking advantage of her, but is able to trace Big Mary and Clyde to Bakersfield, California, and has an emotional reunion with her son. She writes, "In the plowed farmyard near Bakersfield, I began to understand that uniqueness of the person. He was three and I was nineteen, and never again would I think of him as a beautiful appendage of myself".

The end of the book finds Rita defeated by life: "For the first time I sat down defenseless to await life's next assault". The book ends with an encounter with a drug addict who cared enough for her to show her the effects of his drug habit, which galvanizes her to reject drug addiction and to make something of her life for her and her son.

== Themes ==
=== Motherhood and family ===
Beginning in Gather Together, motherhood and family issues are important themes throughout Angelou's autobiographies. The book describes the change and the importance of Rita's relationship with her own mother, the woman who had abandoned her and her brother as children, demonstrated by Rita's return to her mother at the end of the book, "after she realizes how close to the edge she has come, as a woman and as a mother". Vivian Baxter cares for Rita's young son as Rita attempts to make a living. Critic Mary Jane Lupton states that "one gets a strong sense throughout Gather Together of [Rita's] dependence on her mother". Angelou's relationship with her mother becomes more important in Gather Together and Vivian is now more influential in the development of Angelou's attitudes. Lupton calls Clyde's kidnapping a "powerful sequence of mother-loss" and connects it to the kidnapping of Clyde's son in the 1980s. (Note: Angelou describes this incident and her response to it in her essay "My Grandson, Home at Last," published in Woman's Day in 1986.) Like many authors, Angelou viewed the creative writing process and its results as her children and compared the production of this book to giving birth, an apt metaphor given the birth of her son at the end of Caged Bird.

=== Race and racism ===
Angelou's goal, beginning with her first autobiographical work, was to "tell the truth about the lives of black women", but her goal evolved, in her later volumes, to document the ups and downs of her own life. Angelou's autobiographies have the same structure: they give a historical overview of the places she was living in at the time, how she coped within the context of a larger white society, and the ways that her story played out within that context. Critic Selwyn Cudjoe stated that in Gather Together, Angelou is still concerned with the questions of what it means to be a Black female in the U.S., but focuses upon herself at a certain point in history, in the years immediately following World War II. The book begins with a prolog describing the confusion and disillusionment of the African-American community during that time, which matched the alienated and fragmented nature of the main character's life. According to McPherson, African Americans were promised a new racial order that never materialized.

Halfway through Gather Together, an incident occurs that demonstrates the different ways in which Rita and her grandmother handle racism. Rita, when she is insulted by white clerk during a visit to Stamps, reacts with defiance, but when Momma hears about the confrontation, she slaps Rita and sends her back to California. Rita feels that her personhood was being violated, but Momma feels that her granddaughter's behavior was dangerous. Rita's grandmother ceases being an important influence on her life, and Angelou demonstrates that she had to move on in the fight against racism.

Jocelyn A. Glazier, who specializes in teacher education.at George Washington University, used Caged Bird and Gather Together in narrative and multicultural approaches to pedagogy and to train teachers how to discuss race in their classrooms. According to Glazier, Angelou's use of understatement, self-mockery, humor, and irony, readers of Gather Together and the rest of Angelou's autobiographies cause readers to wonder what she left out and unsure about how to respond to the events Angelou describes. Angelou's depictions of her experiences of racism force white readers to explore their feelings about race and their privileged status. Glazier found that although critics have focused on where Angelou fits within the genre of African American autobiography and on her literary techniques, readers react to her storytelling with "surprise, particularly when [they] enter the text with certain expectations about the genre of autobiography".

=== Identity ===
Gather Together retains the freshness of Caged Bird, but has a self-consciousness absent from the first volume. Author Hilton Als states that Angelou "replaces the language of social history with the language of therapy". The book exhibits the narcissism and self-involvement of young adults. It is Rita who is the focus, and all other characters are secondary, and they are often presented "with the deft superficiality of a stage description" who pay the price for Rita's self-involvement. Much of Angelou's writing in this volume, as Als states, is "reactive, not reflective". Angelou chooses to demonstrate Rita's narcissism in Gather Together by dropping the conventional forms of autobiography, which has a beginning, middle, and end. For example, there is no central experience in her second volume, as there is in Caged Bird with Angelou's account of her rape at the age of eight. Lupton believes that this central experience is relocated "to some luminous place in a volume yet to be".

Gather Together, like much of African-American literature, depicts Rita's search for self-discovery, identity, and dignity in the difficult environment of racism, and how she, like other African Americans, were able to rise above it. Rita's search is expressed both outwardly, through her material needs, and inwardly, through love and family relationships. In Caged Bird, despite trauma and parental rejection, Rita's world is relatively secure, but the adolescent young woman in Gather Together experiences the dissolution of her relationships many times. The loneliness that ensues for her is "a loneliness that becomes, at times, suicidal and contributes to her unanchored self". Rita is unsure of who she is or what she would become, so she tries several roles in a restless and frustrated way, as adolescents often do during this period of their lives. Her experimentation was part of her self-education that would successfully bring her into maturity and adulthood. Lupton agrees, stating that Rita survived through trial and error while defining herself as a Black woman. Angelou recognizes that the mistakes she depicts are part of "the fumblings of youth and to be forgiven as such", but young Rita insists that she take responsibility for herself and her child.

Feminist scholar Maria Lauret states that the formation of female cultural identity is woven into Angelou's narrative, setting her up as "a role model for Black women". Lauret agrees with other scholars that Angelou reconstructs the Black woman's image throughout her autobiographies, and that Angelou uses her many roles, incarnations, and identities in her books to "signify multiple layers of oppression and personal history". Angelou begins this technique in her first book, and continues it in Gather Together, especially her demonstration of the "racist habit" of renaming African Americans. Lauret also sees Angelou's themes of the individual's strength and ability to overcome throughout Angelou's autobiographies. Cudjoe states that Angelou is still concerned with what it means to be Black and female in America, but she now describes "a particular type of Black woman at a specific moment in history and subjected to certain social forces which assault the Black woman with unusual intensity". When Angelou was concerned about what her readers would think when she disclosed that she had been a prostitute, her husband Paul Du Feu encouraged her to be honest and "tell the truth as a writer". Cudjoe recognizes Angelou's reluctance to disclose these events in the text, stating that although they are important in her social development, Angelou does not seem "particularly proud of her activity during those 'few tense years'".

=== Education and literacy ===
All of Angelou's autobiographies, especially this volume and its predecessor, is "very much concerned with what [Angelou] knew and how she learned it". Lupton compares Angelou's informal education described in this book with the education of other Black writers of the 20th century. Like writers such as Claude McKay, Langston Hughes, and James Baldwin, Angelou did not earn a college degree and depended upon the "direct instruction of African American cultural forms". As Hagen points out, since Angelou was encouraged to appreciate literature as a young child, she continued to read into her adulthood, exposing herself to a wide variety of authors, ranging from Countee Cullen's poetry to Leo Tolstoy and other Russian authors. Angelou stated, during her stint as a madame, "when my life hinged melodramatically on intrigue and deceit, I discovered the Russian writers".

== Critical reception ==
Gather Together in My Name was not as critically acclaimed as Angelou's first autobiography, but received mostly positive reviews and was recognized as better written. Atlantic Monthly said that the book was "excellently written" and Cudjoe calls the book "neither politically nor linguistically innocent". Although Cudjoe finds Gather Together a weaker autobiography compared to Caged Bird, he states that Angelou's use of language is "the work's saving grace", and that it contains "a much more consistent and sustained flow of eloquent and honey-dipped writing", although he feels that the tight structure of Caged Bird seems to crumble in Gather Together. According to Lupton, Angelou's "childhood experiences were replaced by episodes that a number of critics consider disjointed or bizarre" because Angelou's later works consist of episodes, or fragments, that are "reflections of the kind of chaos found in actual living". Cudjoe thought this convention weakened the book's structure, stating that the events described prevented it from achieving a "complex level of significance". Lupton states, "In altering the narrative structure, Angelou shifts the emphasis from herself as an isolated consciousness to herself as a Black woman participating in diverse experiences among a diverse class of peoples". There are similarities in the structure of both books, however. Like Caged Bird, Gather Together consists of a series of interrelated episodes, and both books start with a poetic preface.

Cudjoe notes that Gather Together lacks the "intense solidity and moral center" found in Caged Bird, and that the strong ethics of the Black community in the rural South is replaced by the alienation and fragmentation of urban life in the first half of the twentieth century. The world that Angelou introduces her readers to in Gather Together leaves her protagonist without a sense of purpose, and as Cudjoe states, "to the brink of destruction in order to realize herself". Critic Lyman B. Hagen disagrees with Cudjoe's judgment that Angelou's second autobiography lacked a moral center, saying that even though there are many unsavory characters in the book and that their lifestyles are not condemned, the innocent Rita emerges triumphant and "evil does not prevail". Rita moves through a sleazy world with good intentions and grows stronger as a result of her exposure to it. Hagen states that if were not for Gather Together's complex literary style, its content would prevent it from being accepted as "an exemplary literary effort".

Although Caged Bird was refreshing in its honesty, something its readers and reviewers value, Angelou's honesty in Gather Together had become, as reviewer John McWhorter perceives it, "more and more formulaic". McWhorter asserts that the events that Angelou describes in Gather Together and in her subsequent autobiographies require more explanation, which she does not provide, although she expects her readers to accept them on face value. In Gather Together, for example, Angelou insists that she is not religious, but she refuses welfare, and even though she was afraid of becoming a lesbian in Caged Bird and presents herself as shy, awkward, and bookish, she pimps for a lesbian couple and becomes a prostitute herself. McWhorter criticizes Angelou for her decisions in Gather Together, and for not explaining them fully, and states, "The people in these flamboyant tales—the narrator included—have a pulp-novel incoherence".

Rita's many physical movements throughout the book causes Hagen to call it a travel narrative. According to Lupton, this movement also affects the book's organization and quality, making it a less satisfactory sequel to Caged Bird. Angelou has responded to this criticism by stating that she attempted to capture "the episodic, erratic nature of adolescence" as she experienced this period in her life. McPherson agrees, stating that Gather Together's structure is more complex than Caged Bird. Angelou's style in Gather Together is more mature and simplified, which allows her to better convey emotion and insight through, as McPherson described it, "sharp and vivid word images".

== Works cited ==
- Angelou, Maya (1974). Gather Together in My Name. New York: Random House. ISBN 0-394-48692-7.
- Cudjoe, Selwyn (1984). "Maya Angelou and the Autobiographical Statement". In Mari Evans (ed.). Black Women Writers (1950–1980): A Critical Evaluation. Garden City, NY: Doubleday. ISBN 0-385-17124-2.
- Hagen, Lyman B. (1997). Heart of a Woman, Mind of a Writer, and Soul of a Poet: A Critical Analysis of the Writings of Maya Angelou. Lanham, Maryland: University Press. ISBN 0-7618-0621-0.
- Lauret, Maria (1994). Liberating Literature: Feminist Fiction in America. New York: Routledge. ISBN 0-415-06515-1.
- Lupton, Mary Jane (1998). Maya Angelou: A Critical Companion. Westport, CT: Greenwood Press. ISBN 0-313-30325-8.
- Lupton, Mary Jane (1999). "Singing the Black Mother". In Joanne M. Braxton (ed.). Maya Angelou's I Know Why the Caged Bird Sings: A Casebook. New York: Oxford Press. ISBN 0-19-511606-2.
- McPherson, Dolly Aimee (1990). Order Out of Chaos: The Autobiographical Works of Maya Angelou. New York: Peter Lang Publishing. ISBN 0-8204-1139-6.
