= Singin' and Swingin' and Gettin' Merry like Christmas =

1976 autobiography by Maya Angelou

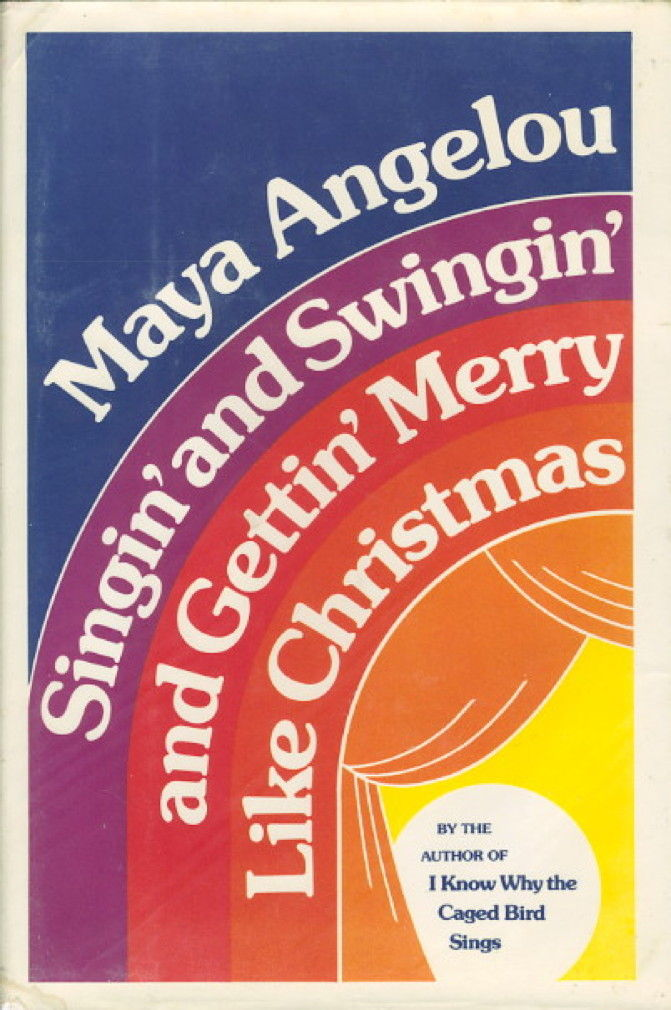
- Author: Maya Angelou
- Language: English
- Genre: Autobiography
- Published: 1976 (Random House, 1st edition)
- Publication place: United States
- Media type: Print (hardback and paperback)
- Pages: 269 pp (hardcover 1st edition)
- ISBN: 0-394-40545-5 (hardcover 1st edition)
- OCLC: 2213357
- Dewey Decimal: 790.2/092/4 B
- LC Class: PS3551.N464 Z475 1976
- Preceded by: Gather Together in My Name
- Followed by: The Heart of a Woman

Singin' and Swingin' and Gettin' Merry like Christmas is the third book of Maya Angelou's seven-volume autobiography series. Set between 1949 and 1955, the book spans Angelou's early twenties. In this volume, Angelou describes her struggles to support her young son, form meaningful relationships, and forge a successful career in the entertainment world. The work's 1976 publication was the first time an African-American woman had expanded her life story into a third volume. Scholar Dolly McPherson calls the book "a graphic portrait of the adult self in bloom" and critic Lyman B. Hagen calls it "a journey of discovery and rebirth".

In Singin' and Swingin, Angelou examines many of the same subjects and themes in her previous autobiographies including travel, music, race, conflict, and motherhood. Angelou depicts the conflict she felt as a single mother, despite her success as a performer as she travels Europe with the musical Porgy and Bess. Her depictions of her travels, which take up 40 percent of the book, have roots in the African-American slave narrative. Angelou uses music and musical concepts throughout Singin' and Swingin'; McPherson calls it Angelou's "praisesong" to Porgy and Bess. Angelou's stereotypes about race and race relations are challenged as she interacts more with people of different races. During the course of this narrative, she changes her name from Marguerite Johnson to Maya Angelou for professional reasons. Her young son changes his name as well, from Clyde to Guy, and their relationship is strengthened as the book ends.

== Background ==
Angelou followed her first two installations of her autobiography, I Know Why the Caged Bird Sings (1969) and Gather Together in My Name (1974), with Singin' and Swingin' and Gettin' Merry like Christmas, published in 1976. It marked the first time a well-known African-American woman writer had expanded her life story into a third autobiography. She also published two volumes of poetry: Just Give Me a Cool Drink of Water 'fore I Diiie (1971), which was nominated for a Pulitzer Prize, and Oh Pray My Wings Are Gonna Fit Me Well (1975). (Note: It was Angelou's early practice to alternate a prose volume with a poetry volume.) Angelou had become recognized and highly respected as a spokesperson for Blacks and women. It made her, as scholar Joanne Braxton stated, "without a doubt ... America's most visible black woman autobiographer".

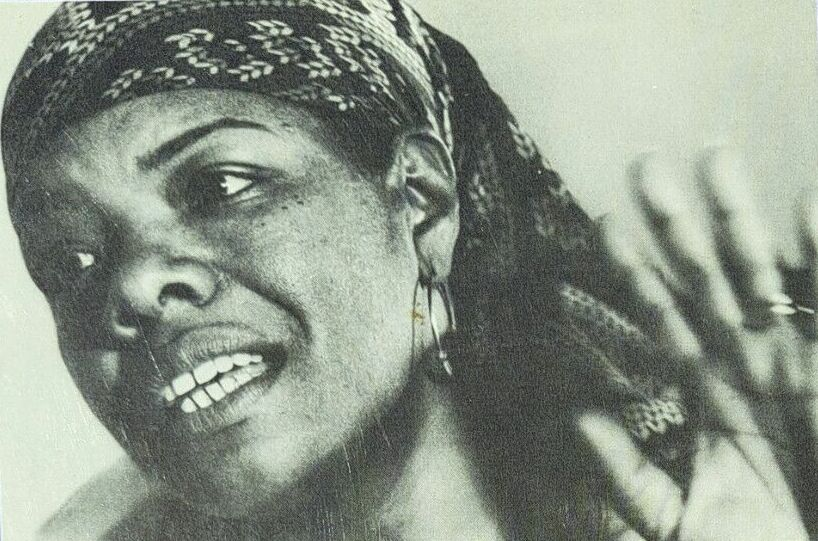
Portrait of Angelou from the first edition of Singin' and Swingin

Writer Hilton Als calls Angelou, along with feminist diarirst Anaïs Nin, "pioneers of self-exposure, willing to turn a spotlight on their own sometimes questionable exploits and emotional shortcomings". Angelou, unlike African-American women autobiographers who wrote during the 19th and early 20th centuries, was able to use herself as the main character in her books. Writer Julian Mayfield, who calls I Know Why the Caged Bird Sings "a work of art that eludes description", states that Angelou's work set a precedent in describing "the black experience" in African-American literature. While Angelou was composing her second autobiography, Gather Together in My Name (1974), she was concerned about how her readers would react to her disclosure that she had been a prostitute. Her husband Paul du Feu talked her into writing about it anyway, encouraging her to "tell the truth as a writer" and "be honest about it".

== Title ==
According to Angelou, the book's title came from the rent parties of the 1920s and 1930s, where people would pay the host an inexpensive entry fee and then eat and drink throughout the weekend. As she stated, people would "sing and swing and get merry like Christmas so one would have some fuel with which to live the rest of the week". These parties, also called "parlor socials", were attended by members of the working class who were unable to afford to go to Harlem's more expensive clubs. As critic Mary Jane Lupton stated: "The concept of the rent party helps describe Angelou's position ... She is a single mother from the South who goes to California and sings and swings for a living. She entertains others for little money as a singer, B-girl, and dancer, without getting very merry at all." Scholar Sondra O'Neale described the phrase as "a folkloric title symbolic of the author's long-deserved ascent to success and fulfillment".

Lupton writes that the title is based upon a simile, a literary technique Angelou often uses in Singin' and Swingin' and throughout her books. Lupton also considered the title "ironic"; Angelou uses positive words like singin' and swingin' that reflect several meanings related to the text. These words describe the beginnings of Angelou's career as an entertainer, but the irony in the terms also depict the conflict Angelou felt about her son. The words "gettin' merry like Christmas" are also ironic: "Singin' and Swingin' and Gettin' Merry like Christmas was Angelou's most unmerry autobiography." Because music is one of the book's themes, Angelou uses abbreviated verb endings in her title that reflect Black dialect and evoke the sound of a blues singer.

== Plot summary ==
Singin' and Swingin opens shortly after Angelou's previous autobiography, Gather Together in My Name. Marguerite (or Maya), a single mother with a young son, is in her early twenties, struggling to make a living. Angelou writes in this book, like her previous works, about the full range of her own experiences. As scholar Dolly McPherson states: "When one encounters Maya Angelou in her story, one encounters the humor, the pain, the exuberance, the honesty, and the determination of a human being who has experienced life fully and retained her strong sense of self." Many people around Angelou influence her growth and, as critic Lyman B. Hagen states, "propel Angelou ever forward". The book's opening chapters find Maya concerned with, as Hagen asserts, "apprehension about her son, a desire for a home, and facing racial conflicts, and seeking a career". Maya is offered a job as a salesperson in a record shop on Fillmore Street in San Francisco. At first she greets her white boss' offers of generosity and friendship with suspicion, but after two months of searching for evidence of racism, Maya begins to "relax and enjoy a world of music". The job allows her to move back into her mother's house and to spend more time with her son.

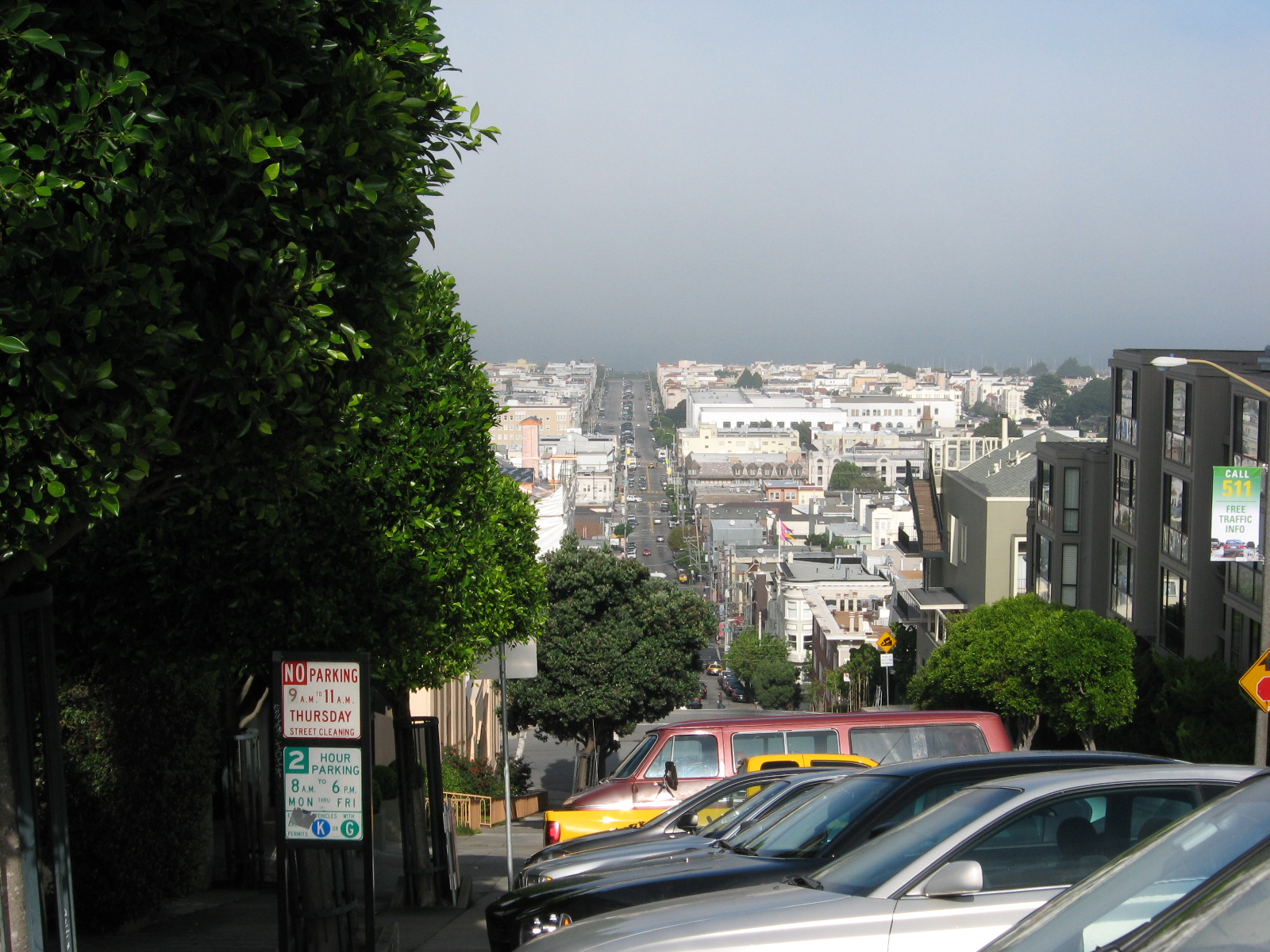
Singin' and Swingin begins on Fillmore Street (shown here in 2007) in San Francisco.

While working in the store, Maya meets Tosh Angelos, a Greek sailor. They fall in love, and he is especially fond of her son. Against her mother's wishes, Maya marries Tosh in 1952. At first, the marriage is satisfying, and it seems that Maya has fulfilled her dream of being a housewife, writing: "My life began to resemble a Good Housekeeping advertisement." Eventually, Maya resents Tosh's demands that she stay at home; she is also bothered by her friends' negative reaction to her interracial marriage. Maya is disturbed by Tosh's atheism and his control of her life, but does little to challenge his authority. After Tosh tells her son Clyde that there is no God, Maya rebels by secretly attending Black churches. After three years the marriage disintegrates when Tosh announces to Maya that he is "tired of being married". She goes into the hospital for an appendectomy, and after the operation, she announces her desire to return to her grandmother in Stamps, but Tosh informs her that Annie died the day of Maya's operation.

A single mother once again, Maya begins to find success as a performer. She gets a job dancing and singing at The Purple Onion, a popular nightclub in San Francisco; on the recommendation of the club's owners, she changes her name from Marguerite Johnson to the "more exotic" "Maya Angelou". She gains the attention of talent scouts, who offer her a role in Porgy and Bess; she turns down the part, however, because of her obligations to The Purple Onion. When her contract expires, Maya goes to New York City to audition for a part opposite Pearl Bailey, but she turns down the offered role to join a European tour of Porgy and Bess.

Leaving Clyde with her mother, Maya travels to 22 countries with the touring company in 1954 and 1955, expressing her impressions about her travels. She writes the following about Verona: "I was really in Italy. Not Maya Angelou, the person of pretensions and ambitions, but me, Marguerite Johnson, who had read about Verona and the sad lovers while growing up in a dusty Southern village poorer and more tragic than the historic town in which I now stood."

Despite Maya's success with Porgy and Bess, she is racked with guilt and regret about leaving her son behind. After receiving bad news about Clyde's health, she quits the tour and returns to San Francisco. Both Clyde and Maya heal from the physical and emotional toll caused by their separation, and she promises never to leave him again. Clyde also announces that he wants to be called "Guy". As Angelou writes: "It took him only one month to train us. He became Guy and we could hardly remember ever calling him anything else."

Maya is true to her promise; she accepts a job performing in Hawaii, and Guy goes with her. At the close of the book, mother and son express pride in each other. When he praises her singing, she writes: "Although I was not a great singer I was his mother, and he was my wonderful, dependently independent son."

== Style and genre ==
According to Lupton, Angelou's choice to continue telling her life story into a third volume affects her point of view because it and her previous autobiographies, which are told in three distinct but connected segments, are linked to each other "by the changing central character and by the first-person point of view". Also according to Lupton, Angelou, in Singin' and Swingin', which does not have the same kind of uniformity that other autobiographies have, deviates from autobiographies that are more contained and tends to "begin in a moment of revelation and to end at some decisive moment in the autobiographer's life". Her use of fiction-writing techniques such as dialogue, characterization, and thematic development has often led reviewers to categorize her books as autobiographical fiction. Angelou stated in a 1989 interview that she was the only "serious" writer to choose the genre to express herself. As critic Susan Gilbert states, Angelou reports not one person's story, but the collective's. Lupton insists that all of Angelou's autobiographies conformed to the genre's standard structure: they were written by a single author, they were chronological, and they contained elements of character, technique, and theme. In a 1983 interview with African-American literature critic Claudia Tate, Angelou calls her books autobiographies. When speaking of her unique use of the genre, Angelou acknowledges that she has followed the slave narrative tradition of "speaking in the first-person singular talking about the first-person plural, always saying I meaning 'we'". Angelou called working in this way "a responsibility", stating: "Trying to work with that form, the autobiographical mode, to change it, to make it bigger, richer, finer, and more inclusive in the twentieth century has been a great challenge for me."

Angelou recognized that there are fictional aspects to all her books; she tended to "diverge from the conventional notion of autobiography as truth". Her approach parallels the conventions of many African-American autobiographies written during the abolitionist period in the US, when the truth was often censored for purposes of self-protection. Scholar George E. Kent has placed Angelou in the long tradition of the African-American autobiography but insists that she has created a unique interpretation of the autobiographical form. In a 1998 interview with journalist George Plimpton, Angelou discusses her writing process, and "the sometimes slippery notion of truth in nonfiction" and memoirs. When asked if she changed the truth to improve her story, she stated: "Sometimes I make a diameter from a composite of three or four people, because the essence in only one person is not sufficiently strong to be written about." Although Angelou has never admitted to changing facts in her stories, she has used the facts to make an impact on the reader. As Hagen states, "One can assume that 'the essence of the data' is present in Angelou's work." Hagen also states that Angelou "fictionalizes, to enhance interest". Angelou's long-time editor, Robert Loomis, agrees, stating that she could rewrite any of her books by changing the order of her facts to make a different impact on the reader.

In Singin' and Swingin' and Gettin' Merry like Christmas, Angelou utilizes repetition as a literary technique. For example, she leaves her child in the care of his grandmother, just as her own mother left her and her older brother in the care of their grandmother in Caged Bird. Much of Singin' and Swingin′ delves into Angelou's guilt about accepting work that forces her to separate from her young son. As Angelou's friend, scholar Dolly McPherson states: "The saddest part of Singin' and Swingin' is the young Guy, who, though deeply loved by Angelou, seems to be shoved into the background whenever a need to satisfy her monetary requirements or theatrical ambitions arises." Despite her great success traveling Europe with the Porgy and Bess tour, she is distressed and full of indecision. For every positive description of her European experiences, there is a lament about Guy that "shuts off" these experiences and prevents her from enjoying the fruit of her hard work.

== Themes ==
=== Travel ===
Travel is a common theme in American autobiography as a whole; as McPherson states, it is something of a national myth to Americans as a people. This is also the case for African-American autobiography, which has its roots in the slave narrative. Like those narratives that focus on the writers' search for freedom from bondage, modern African-American autobiographers like Angelou seek to develop "an authentic self" and the freedom to find it in their community. As McPherson states, "The journey to a distant goal, the return home, and the quest which involves the voyage out, achievement, and return are typical patterns in Black autobiography."

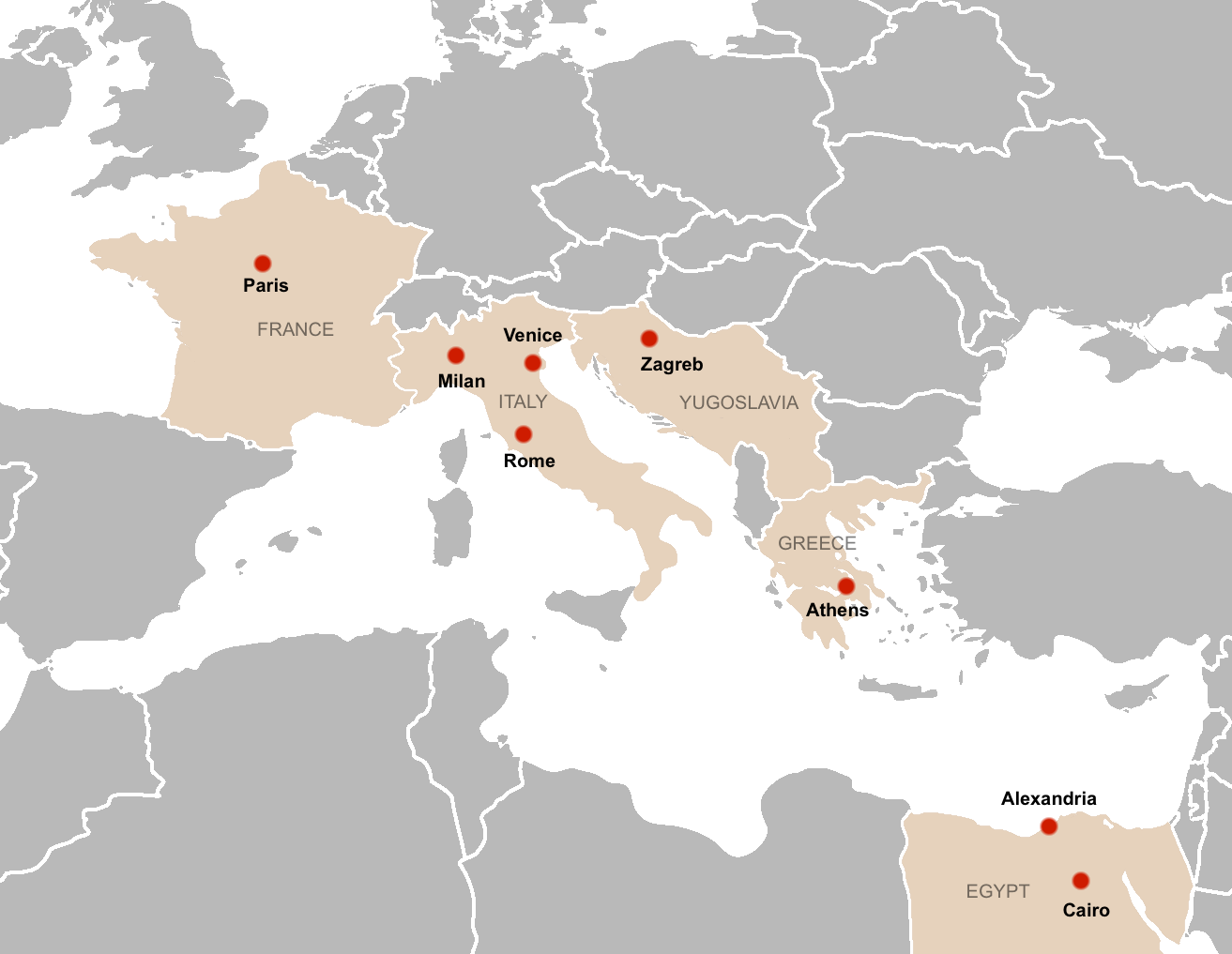
Map of the cities mentioned during Angelou's depiction of her European tour with the opera Porgy and Bess.

For Angelou, this quest takes her from her childhood and adolescence, as described in her first two books, into the adult world. McPherson sees Singin' and Swingin' as "a sunny tour of Angelou's twenties", from early years marked by disappointments and humiliation, into the broader world—to the white world and to the international community. In Angelou's first two volumes, the setting is limited to three places (Arkansas, Missouri, and California), while in Singin' and Swingin', the "setting breaks open" to include Europe as she travels with the Porgy and Bess company. Lupton states that Angelou's travel narrative, which takes up approximately 40 percent of the book, gives the book its organized structure, especially compared to Gather Together in My Name, which is more chaotic. Angelou, writing from the point of view of "an aware and articulate black woman who does not hesitate to make racial generalizations", divides her travel narrative into subgroups in Singin' and Swingin'. Her observations about race, gender, and class, as well as her presentation of herself as a character making those observations, serve to make the book more than a simple travel narrative. As a Black American, her travels around the world put her in contact with many nationalities and classes, expand her experiences beyond her familiar circle of community and family, and complicate her understandings of race relations.

=== Race ===
In Singin' and Swingin'', Angelou continues an examination of her experiences with discrimination, begun in her first two volumes. Critic Selwyn R. Cudjoe refers to "the major problem of her works: what it means to be Black and female in America". Cudjoe divides Singin' and Swingin' into two parts; in the first part, Angelou works out her relationships with the white world, and in the second part, she evaluates her interactions with fellow Black cast members in Porgy and Bess, as well as her encounters with Europe and Africa.

Angelou comes into intimate contact with whites for the first time—whites very different from the racist people she encountered in her childhood. She discovers, as Cudjoe puts it, that her stereotypes of Whites were developed to protect herself from their cruelty and indifference. As McPherson states, "Conditioned by earlier experiences, Angelou distrusts everyone, especially whites. Nevertheless, she is repeatedly surprised by the kindness and goodwill of many whites she meets, and, thus, her suspicions begin to soften into understanding." Cudjoe states that in Singin' and Swingin', Angelou effectively demonstrates "the inviolability of the African American personhood", as well as her own closely guarded defense of it. In order for her to have any positive relationships with whites and people of other races, however, McPherson insists that Angelou "must examine and discard her stereotypical views about Whites". Lyman agrees and points out that Angelou re-examines her lingering prejudices when faced with the broader world full of whites. As Hagen also states, however, this is a complex process, since most of Angelou's experiences with whites are positive during this time. Cudjoe states that as the book's main protagonist, Angelou moves between the white and Black worlds, both defining herself as a member of her community and encountering whites in "a much fuller, more sensuous manner".

In her third autobiography, Angelou is placed in circumstances that force her to change her opinions about whites, not an easy change for her. Louise Cox, the co-owner of the record store she frequents on Fillmore Street, generously offers Angelou employment and friendship. Angelou marries a white man, whose appreciation of Black music breaks her stereotype of whites. This is a difficult decision for Angelou, and she must justify it by rationalizing that Tosh is Greek, and not an American white. She was not marrying "one of the enemy", but she could not escape the embarrassment and shame when they encountered other Blacks. Later, she has a friendship among equals with her white co-workers, Jorie, Don, and Barrie, who assist her job quest at The Purple Onion. Cudjoe insists, "This free and equal relationship is significant to her in that it represents an important stage of her evolution toward adulthood."

=== Music ===
As Lupton states, there is "no doubt in the reader's mind about the importance of music" in Singin' and Swingin'. Angelou's use of opposition and her doubling of plot lines is similar to the polyphonic rhythms in jazz music. McPherson labels Angelou a "blues autobiographer", someone who, like a blues musician, includes the painful details and episodes from her life.

Music appears throughout Angelou's third autobiography, starting with the title, which evokes a blues song and references the beginnings of Angelou's career in music and performance. She starts Singin' and Swingin' the same way she starts Caged Bird: with an epigraph to set the tone. Here, the epigraph is a quotation from an unidentified three-line stanza in classic blues form. After the epigraph, "music" is the first word in the book. As the story opens, a lonely Angelou finds solace in Black music, and is soon hired as a salesgirl in a record store on Fillmore Street in San Francisco. She meets and falls in love with her first husband after she discovers their shared appreciation of Black music. After learning of her grandmother's death, her reaction, "a dazzling passage three paragraphs long" according to Lupton, is musical; not only does it rely upon gospel tradition, but is also influenced by African-American literary texts, especially James Weldon Johnson's "Go Down Death—A Funeral Sermon".

After her divorce, Angelou earns a living for herself and her son with music and dance; this decision marks a turning point in her life. Angelou's new career seems, as Hagen asserts, to be propelled by a series of parties, evoking the title of this book. Hagen also calls her tour with Porgy and Bess "the biggest party by far of the book". McPherson calls Singin' and Swingin' "Angelou's praisesong" to the opera. Angelou has "fallen hopelessly in love with the musical", even turning down other job offers to tour with its European company. McPherson also calls Porgy and Bess "an antagonist that enthralls Angelou, beckoning and seducing her away from her responsibilities". As Lupton states, Porgy and Bess is Angelou's "foundation for her later performances in dance, theater, and song".

=== Conflict ===
Conflict, or Angelou's presentation of opposites, is another theme in Singin' and Swingin' and Gettin' Merry like Christmas. As Lupton states, Angelou constructs a plot by mixing opposing events and attitudes, which she calls Angelou's "dialectical method". The book is full of conflicts: in Angelou's marriage, her feelings between being a good mother and a successful performer, the stereotypes about other races, and her new experiences with whites. Lupton believes this presentation of conflict is what makes Angelou's writing "brilliant"; Lupton finds that the strength of Singin' and Swingin' comes, in part, from Angelou's duplication of conflicts underlying the plot, characters, and thought patterns in the book. Lupton adds: "Not many other contemporary autobiographers have been able to capture, either in a single volume or in a series, the opposition of desires that is found in Singin' and Swingin' and Gettin' Merry like Christmas and, to a lesser extent, in Angelou's other volumes." Even the closing sentence of the book ("Although I was not a great singer I was his mother, and he was my wonderful, dependently independent son") demonstrates Angelou's dialectical construction, sums up the contradictions of Angelou's character, and alludes to mother/son patterns in her later books.

=== Motherhood ===
As Lupton states, motherhood is a "prevailing theme" throughout Angelou's autobiographies: "Angelou presents a rare kind of literary model, the working mother." In Singin' and Swingin', Angelou finds herself in a situation "very familiar to career women with children", and is forced to choose between being a loving mother or a "fully realized person". As scholar Sondra O'Neale puts it, in this book Angelou sheds the image of "unwed mother" with "a dead-end destiny" that had followed her throughout her previous autobiography.

Angelou's need for security for her young son motivates her choices in Singin' and Swingin', especially her decision to marry Tosh Angelos. The book has been called "a love song to Angelou's son" even though she feels a deep sense of guilt and regret when she has to leave him to tour with Porgy and Bess, which prevents her from fully enjoying the experience. Guy, like his mother, also changes him name as the story progresses and he becomes an intelligent, sensitive young man. As Guy grows, so does his mother; Hagen states that their growth moves Angelou's story forward. When Angelou discovers how deeply their separation injures Guy, she leaves the Porgy and Bess tour before it ends, at great personal cost. By the end of the book, their bond is deepened and she promises never to leave him again. As Hagen states, Maya embraces the importance of motherhood, just as she had done at the end of her previous autobiographies.

== Critical reception ==
Like Angelou's two previous autobiographies, Singin' and Swingin' received mostly positive reviews. Kathryn Robinson of the School Library Journal predicts that the book would be as enthusiastically received as the earlier installments in Angelou's series, and that the author had succeeded in "sharing her vitality" with her audience. Linda Lipnack Kuehl of the Saturday Review, although she prefers the rhythm of Caged Bird, found Singin' and Swingin' "very professional, even-toned, and ... quite engaging". Kuehl also finds that Angelou's story translates smoothly to the printed page. R.E. Almeida of the Library Journal finds the book "a pleasant sequel", one in which Angelou's "religious strength, personal courage, and ... talent" was apparent in its pages.

One negative review was written by Margaret McFadden-Gerber in Magill's Literary Annual, who found the book disappointing and felt that it lacked the power and introspection of Angelou's previous books. At least one reviewer expresses disappointment that Angelou did not use her status to effect any political change in Singin' and Swingin'. Critic Lyman B. Hagen responds to this criticism by stating that Angelou's status during the events she describes in this autobiography did not lend itself to that kind of advocacy, and that as a person, Angelou had not evolved into the advocate that she would become later in her life. Reviewer John McWhorter finds many of the events Angelou describes throughout all of her autobiographies incoherent and confusing, and in need of further explanation as to her motives and reasons for her behavior. For example, McWhorter suggests that Angelou does a poor job of explaining her reasons for her marriage to Tosh Angelos, as well as their divorce. "In an autobiography in which a black woman marries outside of her race in the 1950s, we need to know more."

== Works cited ==
- Angelou, Maya (1976). Singin' and Swingin' and Gettin' Merry like Christmas. New York: Random House. ISBN 0-679-45777-1.
- Cudjoe, Selwyn R. (1984). "Maya Angelou and the Autobiographical Statement". In Evans, Mari (ed.). Black Women Writers (1950–1980): A Critical Evaluation. Garden City, N.Y.: Doubleday. pp. 6–24. ISBN 0-385-17124-2.
- Gillespie, Marcia Ann; Butler, Rosa Johnson; Long, Richard A. (2008). Maya Angelou: A Glorious Celebration. New York: Random House. ISBN 978-0-385-51108-7.
- Hagen, Lyman B. (1997). Heart of a Woman, Mind of a Writer, and Soul of a Poet: A Critical Analysis of the Writings of Maya Angelou. Lanham, Maryland: University Press. ISBN 0-7618-0621-0.
- Lupton, Mary Jane (1998). Maya Angelou: A Critical Companion. Westport, Connecticut: Greenwood Press. ISBN 0-313-30325-8.
- McPherson, Dolly A. (1990). Order Out of Chaos: The Autobiographical Works of Maya Angelou. New York: Peter Lang Publishing. ISBN 0-8204-1139-6.
- O'Neale, Sondra (1984). "Reconstruction of the Composite Self: New Images of Black Women in Maya Angelou's Continuing Autobiography". In Evans, Mari (ed.). Black Women Writers (1950–1980): A Critical Evaluation. Garden City, New York: Doubleday. pp. 25–36. ISBN 0-385-17124-2.
