= Selwyn Cudjoe =

Trinidad and Tobago academic, scholar, historian, essayist and editor (born 1943)

- Born: Selwyn Reginald Cudjoe; 1 December 1943 (age 82); Tacarigua, Trinidad and Tobago
- Education: Fordham University; Columbia University; Cornell University
- Occupations: Professor, historian, scholar
- Employer: Wellesley College
- Known for: Caribbean literature and Caribbean intellectual history

Selwyn Cudjoe (born 1 December 1943) is a Trinidadian academic, scholar, historian, essayist and editor who is Professor of Africana Studies at Wellesley College. He was also the Margaret E. Deffenbaugh and LeRoy T. Carlson Professor in Comparative Literature and the Marion Butler McClean Professor in the History of Ideas at Wellesley. Cudjoe's particular expertise is Caribbean literature and Caribbean intellectual history, and he teaches courses on the African-American literary tradition, African literature, black women writers, and Caribbean literature.

== Life and career ==
Selwyn Reginald Cudjoe was born in Tacarigua, Trinidad and Tobago, like several generations of his family, growing up on a sugar estate on which ancestors of his had worked. His parents were Lionel R. and Carmen Rose Cudjoe; his great-grandfather, Jonathon Cudjoe, was born in Tacarigua in 1833, the last year of formal slavery, and his great-grandmother, Amelia, was born in the same village in 1837.

Cudjoe attended Tacarigua EC School, before migrating to the US in 1964, at the age of 21. He continued his studies at Fordham University, where he received a B.A. in English (1969) and an M.A. in American Literature (1972), attended Columbia University (1971–72), and subsequently earned a Ph.D. in American Literature from Cornell University (1976). He has taught at Ithaca College and at Cornell, Harvard, Brandeis, Fordham, and Ohio universities, before joining the Wellesley College faculty in 1986. Cudjoe has also been a lecturer at Auburn State Prison and taught at Bedford-Stuyvesant Youth-In-Action.

He has served as a director of the Central Bank of Trinidad and Tobago and as the president of the National Association for the Empowerment of African People (Trinidad and Tobago).

=== Writing ===
Among the many books Cudjoe has written are Caribbean Visionary: A. R. F. Webber and the Making of the Guyanese Nation (2011), The Role of Resistance in Caribbean Literature (2010), and Beyond Boundaries: The Intellectual Tradition of Trinidad and Tobago in the Nineteenth Century (2002). Cudjoe's 2018 book, The Slavemaster of Trinidad: William Hardin Burnley and the Nineteenth-Century Atlantic World, is described by Henry Louis Gates Jr. as a "beautifully written and meticulously researched account of Burnley's life" that "unfolds the story of a planter who was born in America, educated in England, and made his fortune in the Caribbean. Measured in tone, this book not only exposes Burnley's public and private racism, but also places his life in context of the greater historical currents of the first half of the 19th century Atlantic world. Cudjoe has written a volume essential to a full understanding of the history of Trinidad." According to Trinidad and Tobago Prime Minister Keith Rowley, "Cudjoe's new book should be used as a teaching tool in all schools across the country." The Slavemaster of Trinidad was announced on the 2019 longlist for the OCM Bocas Prize for Caribbean Literature.

Cudjoe has edited a number of titles, including Caribbean Women Writers, an anthology of essays collected from the first international conference on Caribbean women writers, which he organised at Wellesley College in 1988, and, most recently, Narratives of Amerindians in Trinidad and Tobago; or, Becoming Trinbagonian (2016), "a fascinating compendium of key documents on the narration of the Amerindian presence in Trinidad".

Cudjoe writes a weekly column in the TnT Mirror, and his work has appeared in many other publications, including The New York Times, The Washington Post, Boston Globe, International Herald Tribune, Baltimore Sun, Amsterdam News, Trinidad and Tobago Review, Callaloo, New Left Review, Harvard Educational Review, Essence, Trinidad Guardian and Trinidad Express.

He has also written several documentaries, including Tacarigua: A Village in Trinidad and Caribbean Women Writers (1994), and hosted programmes for Trinidad and Tobago Television.

== Selected bibliography ==
- Resistance and Caribbean Literature, Ohio University Press, 1982, ISBN 978-0821405734
- Movement of the People: Essays on independence, Calaloux Publications, 1983, ISBN 978-0911565225
- A Just and Moral Society, Calaloux Publications, 1984, ISBN 978-0911565027
- V. S. Naipaul: A Materialist Reading, University of Massachusetts Press, 1988, ISBN 978-0-87023-620-4
- Grenada: Two Essays, Calaloux Publications, 1990, ISBN 978-9991792224
- Tacarigua: A Village in Trinidad, Calaloux Publications, 1995, ISBN 978-0911565249
- Beyond Boundaries: The Intellectual Tradition of Trinidad and Tobago in the Nineteenth Century, University of Massachusetts Press, 2002, ISBN 978-1558493919
- Indian Time Ah Come in Trinidad and Tobago, Calaloux Publications, 2010, ISBN 978-0-911565-30-0
- The Role of Resistance in Caribbean Literature, Nabu Press, 2010, ISBN 978-1171848783; HardPress Publishing, 2013, ISBN 978-1313385732
- Caribbean Visionary: A. R. F. Webber and the Making of the Guyanese Nation, University Press of Mississippi, 2011, ISBN 978-1617031977
- Preserving the Tacarigua Savannah: Respecting Our Heritage, 2013
- The Slavemaster of Trinidad: William Hardin Burnley and the Nineteenth-Century Atlantic World, University of Massachusetts Press, 2018, ISBN 978-1625343703

=== Edited books ===
- Caribbean Women Writers: Essays from the First International Conference, Calaloux Publications/University of Massachusetts Press, 1991, ISBN 978-0870237324
- Eric E. Williams Speaks: Essays on Colonialism and Independence, University of Massachusetts Press, 1993, ISBN 978-0870238888
- (With William E. Cain) C.L.R. James: His Intellectual Legacies, University of Massachusetts Press, 1995, ISBN 978-0870239076
- Narratives of Amerindians in Trinidad and Tobago; or, Becoming Trinbagonian, 2016, ISBN 978-0911565324.
