= Joseph Hume =

Scottish surgeon and Radical politician (1777–1856)

Joseph Hume FRS
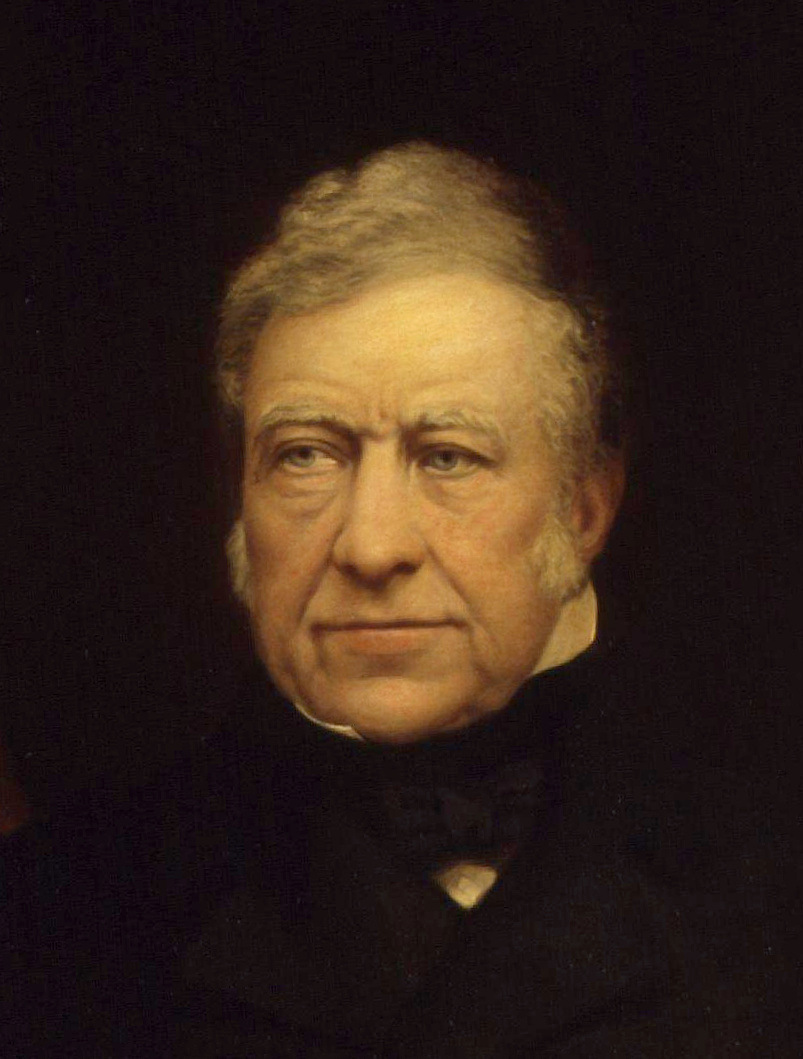
- Joseph Hume, 1854

Member of Parliament (MP) for Weymouth
- In office 1812–1812 Serving with Sir John Murray; Richard Augustus Tucker Steward; Charles Adams (MP)
- Preceded by: Sir John Johnstone
- Succeeded by: Henry Trail

Member of Parliament (MP) for Aberdeen Burghs
- In office 1818–1830
- Preceded by: James Farquhar
- Succeeded by: Sir James Carnegie

Member of Parliament (MP) for Middlesex
- In office 1830–1837 Serving with George Byng
- Preceded by: Samuel Charles Whitbread
- Succeeded by: Thomas Wood

Member of Parliament (MP) for Kilkenny
- In office 7 August 1837 – 3 July 1841
- Preceded by: Daniel O'Connell
- Succeeded by: John O'Connell

Member of Parliament (MP) for Montrose Burghs
- In office 1842–1855
- Preceded by: Patrick Chalmers
- Succeeded by: William Edward Baxter

Personal details
- Born: 22 January 1777 Montrose, Angus, Scotland
- Died: 20 February 1855 (aged 78) Somerton, Norfolk
- Resting place: Kensal Green Cemetery, London
- Party: Tory; Radicals
- Spouse: Maria Burnley (m. 1815)
- Children: 7
- Parent: James Hume (father)
- Relatives: William Hardin Burnley (brother-in-law); Allan Octavian Hume (son); Mary Catherine Hume-Rothery (daughter)
- Education: Montrose Academy
- Alma mater: University of Aberdeen; University of Edinburgh

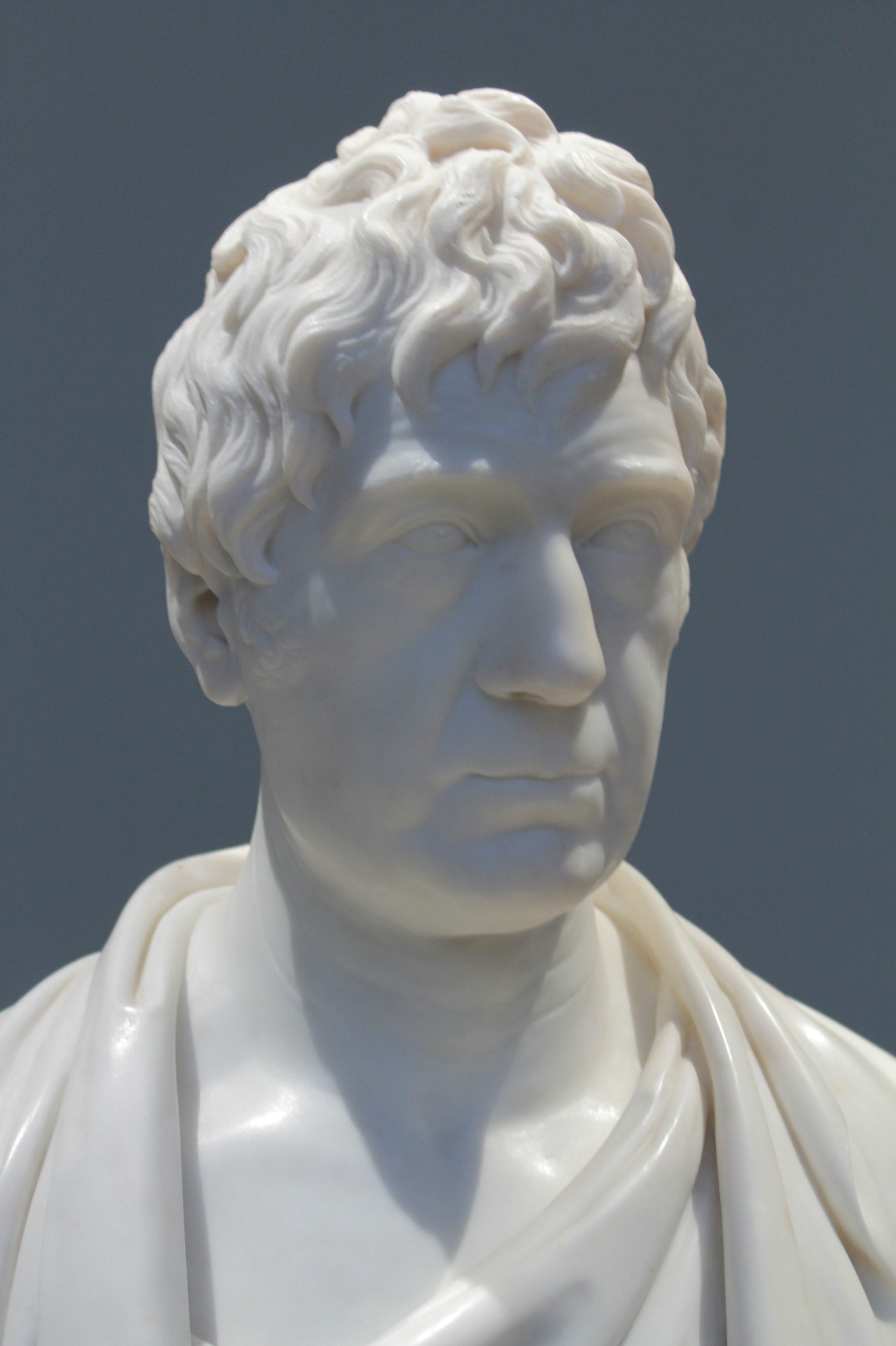
Joseph Hume by Alexander Handyside Ritchie, 1830

Joseph Hume FRS (22 January 1777 – 20 February 1855) was a Scottish surgeon and Radical MP.

== Early life ==
He was born the son of a shipmaster James Hume in Montrose, Angus, who died shortly after he was born. He attended Montrose Academy, where he knew the older James Mill; and from 1790 was apprenticed to a local surgeon-apothecary, John Bale.

== Medical career ==
Hume studied medicine at the University of Aberdeen and then the University of Edinburgh. He had as patron David Scott MP. Before he qualified, he saw wartime service as surgeon-mate on the Hoy (boat) HMS Hawke; and then was on the East Indiaman Hope for 18 months.

In 1799 Hume sailed to India, nominated to the Bengal service by Jacob Bosanquet of the British East India Company. He worked his passage as medical officer on the Houghton. Once there, he was commissioned as a surgeon to the 7th Sepoy Regiment. Gaining fluency in Hindustani and Persian, he worked also as an interpreter and on commissariat.

On the eve of the Second Anglo-Maratha War, Hume came to the attention of Lord Lake with a method to recover damp gunpowder. On the outbreak of war, he was with General Peregrine Powell who marched from Allahabad into Bundelkhand. He took on again a variety of roles during the campaign.

== Return to the United Kingdom ==
In 1808, Hume resigned from the army and returned to the United Kingdom with a fortune of about £40,000. Between 1808 and 1811, he travelled around England and Europe.

In 1818 Hume was elected a Fellow of the Royal Society, being, according to his nomination, "well versed in various branches of Useful knowledge and particularly in Chemistry, in various branches of oriental literature and Antiquities".

== Political career ==
=== Weymouth ===
In 1812, Hume obtained through Spencer Perceval a seat in Parliament for Weymouth, Dorset, England, vacant by the death of Sir John Johnstone, 6th Baronet. He was allowed it by Masterton Ure, was elected unopposed and voted as a Tory supporter of the Perceval administration. Hume was present at Perceval's assassination in the House of Commons in May that year, when he helped detain Perceval's assailant John Bellingham and testified that he was "perfectly sane" from Bellingham's composed behaviour immediately following.

The parliament was dissolved for the 1812 United Kingdom general election. Ure refused to support Hume further, in fact being overruled by the Duke of Cumberland and Viscount Newark. Hume stood nonetheless in the four-member constituency, and received just two votes. He had toed the line in some matters, but on the expulsion of Benjamin Walsh and the Luddite legislation he had shown independence unacceptable to the Duke. Hume kicked up a fuss and took legal action, and was paid off with £1,000, supposedly to cover election expenses.

This brief Tory period did bring Hume an association with the Duke of Kent and Strathearn, a patron of Joseph Lancaster. John Cam Hobhouse relayed an anecdote told by John Conroy of the Duke's household, in which Hume advised the Duke to limit the Duchess to one horse-chaise. In 1833, Hume provided Alexander Burnes with an introduction to his daughter Princess Victoria.

=== Hiatus and route to radicalism ===
In connection with the financial troubles of Joseph Lancaster, Hume met Francis Place in 1813, through Joseph Fox. It was Place who brought Hume into the group of political radicals with whom he from then on was associated.

Hume renewed his friendship with James Mill: they both and Place were interested in the school project of a West London Lancasterian Association floated in 1813. The project took a turn for the worse in 1814, when Francis Burdett intervened and imposed on it his associate Thomas Evans and Arthur Thistlewood, pushing out Place who then abandoned politics for four years. By the next decade Hume was identified with the group of followers of Mill and Jeremy Bentham known as the Philosophical Radicals, with organ the Westminster Review.

At this period Hume also aimed to become a director of the East India Company, a position he described in an 1813 speech as an "arduous and most respectable office". He lobbied the company's shareholders, and in so doing met Maria Burnley, whom he married in 1815.

=== Aberdeen Burghs ===
When Hume was returned to Parliament once more in 1818, as member for the Aberdeen Burghs in Scotland, it was with the support of William Maule. He stood there on a radical platform of his own devising.

In 1823 Hume contested the election of James Duff, 4th Earl Fife as rector of Marischal College in Aberdeen; in 1824 and 1825 he himself was elected. He revived the long-disused rectorial court in 1825, but offended the electorate of students by the use he made of it. He lost out in 1826 and 1827 to James McGrigor, but was re-elected in 1828. There was a Royal Commission on the Scottish universities in 1826, and Hume claimed he had prompted it.

In Aberdeen's local politics, Hume was at odds with a largely Tory town council, but had supporters including Alexander Bannerman. His chances there dropped when he failed to support a road bill before parliament. Faced in 1829 with a serious challenge from Sir James Carnegie, 5th Baronet, with a Brechin base, Hume decided to change seat.

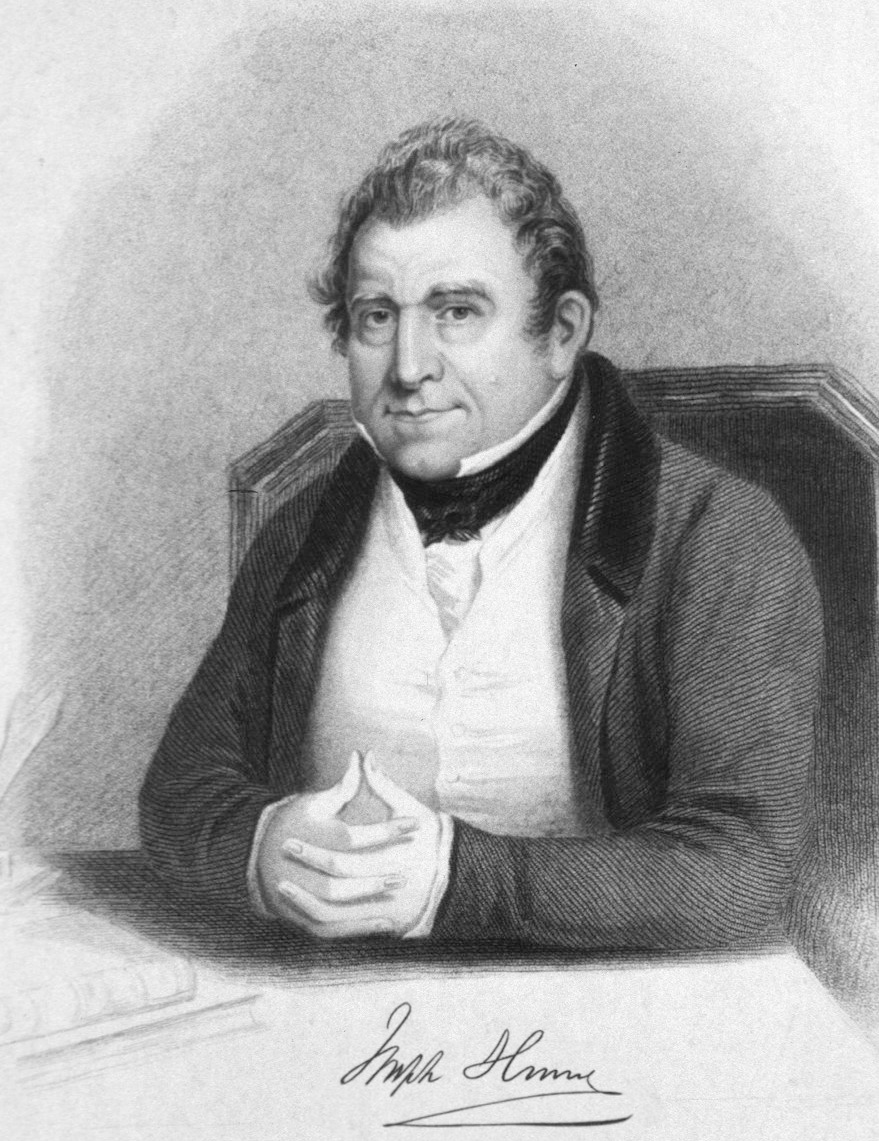
Joseph Hume in middle age, engraving

=== Later seats ===
In March 1830, with Henry Hunt and Daniel O'Connell, Hume set up the London-based Metropolitan Political Union, with a platform that included manhood suffrage and the secret ballot. He was elected that year for Middlesex, England. He produced a County Rates Bill, and aimed to re-organise local government. He came under attack, however, by 1837, as a moderate "Whig-Radical" too close to the Melbourne ministry.

Hume later represented Kilkenny, Ireland (1837); and then, from 1842, for the rest of his life Montrose Burghs.

== Hume as politician ==
Hume was a relentless, individualistic campaigner over a wide range of causes. Élie Halévy (English translation) characterised him in terms of "pigheadedness", with a "heavy mind"; and he was always a "dull yet dogged orator".

During much of the Liverpool ministry, Hume could be called "the leader of the parliamentary Radicals", with emphasis on public finance. Initially his group could be called (by Viscount Castlereagh) "Creevey, Hume ... and two or three others" who sifted through details; it was nicknamed "The Mountain", from the Montagnards in France of the 1790s. Joseph Nightingale credited Hume's attritional tactics with the resignations of Lord Ellenborough and Nicholas Vansittart.

A close ally, in parliament from 1826, was Henry Warburton. The retrenchment issue gained Hume praise from William Cobbett, and his criticism of the ultra-Protestant line on Ireland also drew support. Opposing the Canning administration in 1827, however, Henry Brougham wrote to Sir Robert Wilson that the Whigs "shall have no connection with Hume & Co. and the Benthamites", while expecting their votes 90% of the time.

Hume often annoyed colleagues on the same side of the argument. He only with difficulty gained the trust of Francis Place, who took many years to come round to James Mill's view of his character. His attitude affected coalition-building. Alexander Somerville wrote about the formation in 1830 of the Grey ministry:

We one and all thought it wrong that Joseph Hume should not be a member of the new government. We were ignorant of party connections and differences,—ignorant of the atomic nature of some politicians, of the gregarious nature of others.

Around 1831, "Hume, Warburton and others" formed a recognisable group, still known as "The Mountain". After the Reform Act 1832, there were new radical MPs, but parliamentary voting support for the radicals reached a peak of 40, apart from specific issues on further electoral reform. Hume had become an "old parliamentary radical", Cobbett a "national radical". At the period of the 1835 Lichfield House Compact, Hume's plan to unite the parliamentary radicals with Daniel O'Connell's followers proved divisive. In 1836–7 he was behind the Constitutional newspaper, aiming to appeal to militant radicals.

Hume was an early supporter of the London Working Men's Association.

== Hume's campaigns ==
=== Public finances ===
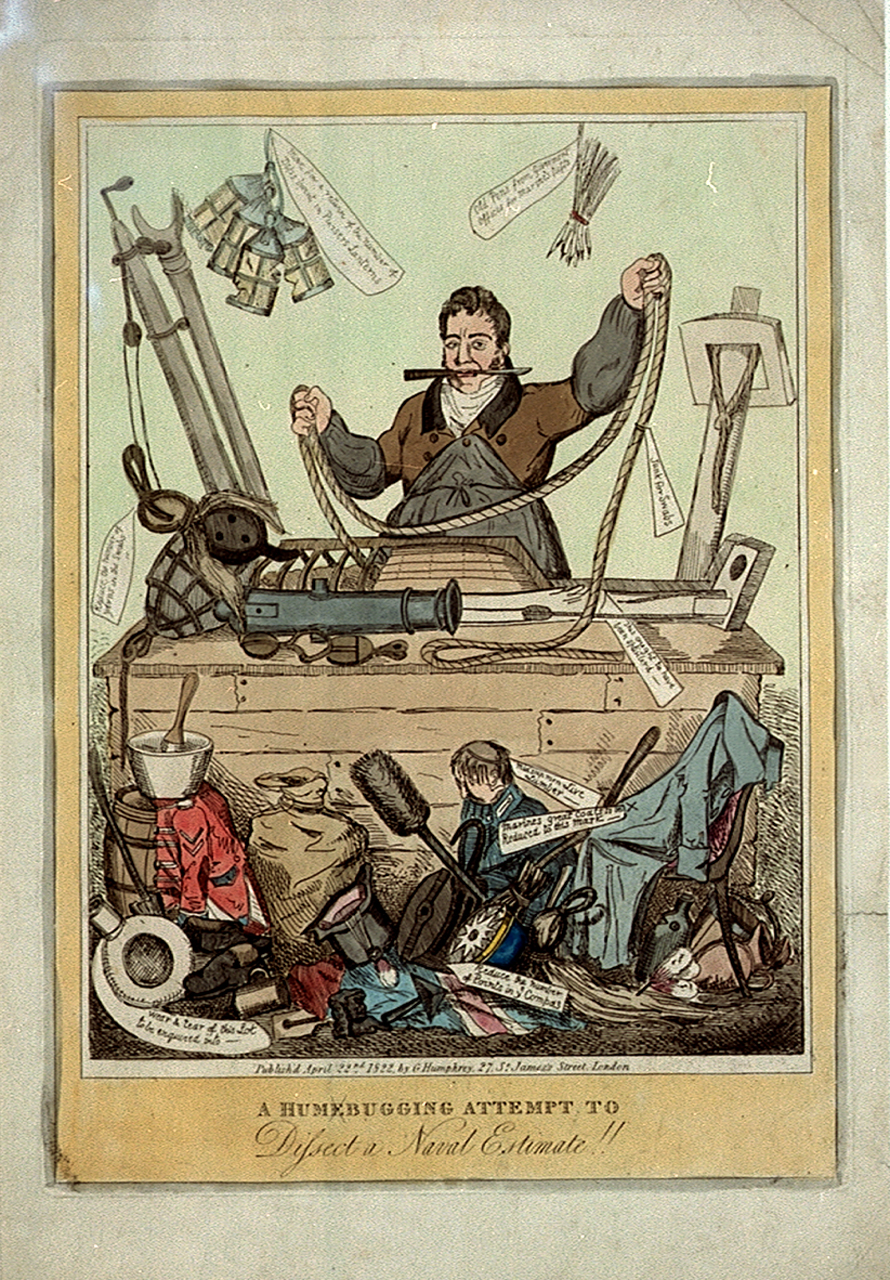
A Humebugging attempt to Dissect a Naval Estimate, 1822

Hume made a habit of challenging and bringing to a vote every item of public expenditure. In 1820, he secured the appointment of a committee to report on the expense of collecting tax revenue. He helped to abolish the sinking fund. It was he who caused the word "retrenchment" to be added to the Radical programme "peace and reform." The groat coin (fourpence) was re-introduced in 1836 during the reign of William IV at the suggestion of Hume. Popularly known as the joey after Hume's first name, it was introduced to ease transactions for London cab fares. As the last groats were struck in 1888, the nickname passed to the silver threepence coin, in circulation until the 1940s.

=== Labour organisation ===
The Combination Act 1799 and its sequel Combination Act 1800 were repealed by the Combination of Workmen Act 1824, promoted by Hume and other radicals, in line with Benthamite principles on industrial harmony. Hume had packed a parliamentary committee on the issue, to support his artisan associate Francis Place. There was an immediate surge in disputes. The Combinations of Workmen Act 1825 backed by William Huskisson then removed the legal right to strike, which remained the situation until the 1870s.

Hume brought about the repeal of the laws prohibiting the export of machinery, and of the act preventing workmen from going abroad.

=== Military ===
Hume protested against the use of flogging in the army, giving evidence to a parliamentary committee in 1835 based on his time as army surgeon in India. He thought the inducement of a proportion of army commissions should be reserved for soldiers drawn from the ranks, an idea strongly opposed by the Duke of Wellington on social grounds.

He also campaigned against the impressment of sailors, and imprisonment for debt.

== Burnley Hall and death ==
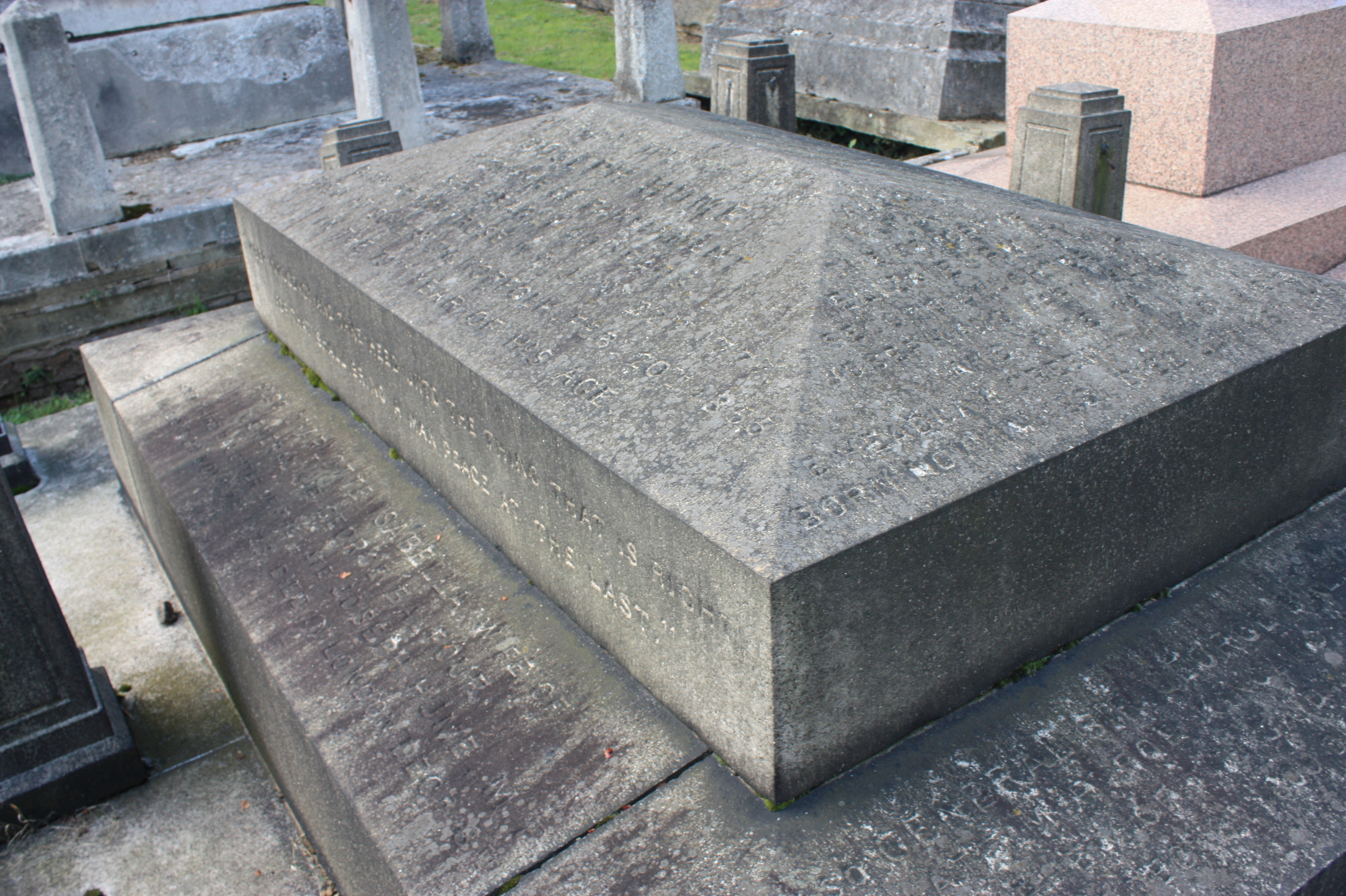
The grave of Joseph Hume, Kensal Green Cemetery

Hume in 1824 bought the Somerton estate in Norfolk, north of Great Yarmouth, from the heirs of Sir Philip Stephens, 1st Baronet, and named the house there Burnley Hall from his wife's name before marriage. It became his seat. He died there in 1855 and is buried to the north-east of the main chapel in Kensal Green Cemetery in London next to his good friend William Williams.

== Works ==
- A blank verse translation of The Inferno (1812)
- Letter to the Chancellor of the Exchequer (1812), suggested that Luddism could be addressed by free trade and organisation principles applied to framework knitting.
- The Substance of the Speech of Joseph Hume ...: Delivered at an Adjourned General Court of the Proprietors of East India Stock, Held in the India House, on the 19th of January, 1813 (1813)
- The Speech of Mr. Joseph Hume, at the East-India House, on the 6th of October, 1813 (1813)
- A Plan for a New General System of Weights (1816)
- Economy and Retrenchment. Speech of Joseph Hume in the House of Commons, Wednesday, the 27th of June, 1821, on Economy and Retrenchment (1822)
- The Celebrated Letter of Joseph Hume ... to W. L. Mackenzie ... Mayor of Toronto (1834)
- Speech of Mr. Hume, in the Debate on the Motion of the Marquis of Chandos, on the 10th of March, 1835, for the Total Repeal of the Malt Tax (1835)
- On the Corn Laws and the Claims of the Agriculturists to Relief from Taxation : Speech of Joseph Hume, Esq., M.P., on the Motion of the Marquess of Chandos, in the House of Commons on Wednesday, April 27, 1836 (1836)
- On the Bank of England; and the State of the Currency (1839). There was a reply that year on the financing of the Slave Compensation Act 1837 by the economist Richard Page (1773–1841) ("Daniel Hardcastle").
- Debate on Sugar Duties: speech of Joseph Hume, Esq., M.P., in the House of Commons, on the 13th May, 1841, on the motion of Lord John Russell (1841)
- Letter from Joseph Hume, Esq., M.P., et al. (1853)

== Family ==
Hume married in 1815, at St Pancras, Maria Burnley, the daughter of Hardin Burnley, an American merchant and East India Company director, and sister of William Hardin Burnley. They had three sons and four daughters: the children included Allan Octavian Hume and Mary Catherine Hume-Rothery.

- Joseph Huntley Hume, eldest son, died in 1871 aged 52.
- Maria Burnley (died 1885), married in 1843 Charles Gubbins (died 1866) of the East India Company civil service. He was the son of Major-General Joseph Gubbins and his wife Charlotte Bathoe. Charles having adopted his mother's surname during the 1860s, she is often known as Maria Burnley Bathoe. She contributed 5,000 quotations to the New English Dictionary.
- Eleanor, third daughter, married John Stratford Rodney, son of John Rodney, as his second wife.
- Charlotte Isabella married in 1848 her first cousin George Balfour, whose mother Susan was sister to Joseph Hume.

== Legacy ==
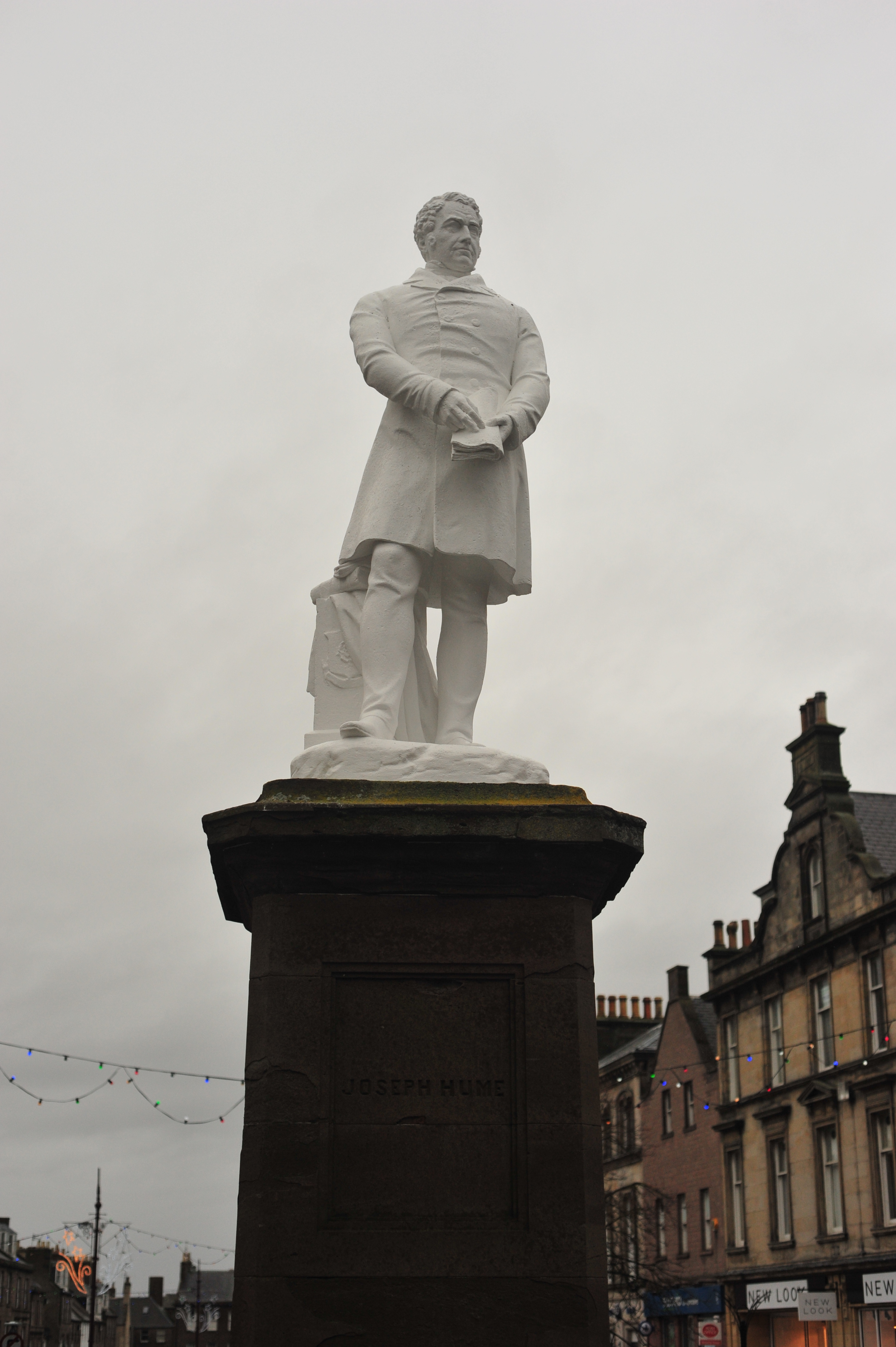
Statue of Hume, in the High Street of Montrose, at its intersection with Hume Street

A memorial of Hume was published by his son Joseph Hume (London, 1855). A subscription fund established a Joseph Hume Scholarship, in jurisprudence and political economy, at University College London. As of 2021 it is still awarded.

According to the History of the Silver Coinage of England by Edward Hawkins, a groat was known as a "Joey". It was "so called from Joseph Hume, M.P., who strongly recommended the coinage for the sake of paying short cab-fares, etc."

=== Radical commemoration ===
The Political Martyrs Monument, Edinburgh

In 1837 Hume initiated a plan for a memorial to the Scottish Political Martyrs, victims of the Pitt administration's policy of the 1790s. It was supported by Peter Mackenzie, a radical journalist in Glasgow. He had already set up a memorial for John Baird and Andrew Hardie, two weavers executed in the 1820 Radical War. On 21 August 1844, 3000 gathered to see Hume lay the monument's foundation stone at the Old Calton Cemetery, Edinburgh.

In February 1852, a second monument to the Scottish Political Martyrs, again initiated by Hume, was unveiled at Nunhead Cemetery, London.

== Collections ==
Hume bequeathed his working library of approximately 5000 pamphlets to University College London in 1855. The pamphlets - many of which contain Hume's own annotations - reflect the causes he championed throughout his life including universal suffrage, ending imprisonment for debt, and reductions in church power.

Parliament of the United Kingdom
Preceded by Charles Adams; Richard Steward; Sir John Lowther Johnstone, Bt; Sir John Murray, Bt	Member of Parliament for Weymouth and Melcombe Regis; 1812–1812; With: Charles Adams; Richard Steward; Sir John Murray, Bt	Succeeded by Sir John Murray, Bt; Thomas Wallace; John Broadhurst; Henry Trail
Preceded by James Farquhar	Member of Parliament for Aberdeen Burghs; 1818–1830	Succeeded by Sir James Carnegie, Bt
Preceded by George Byng; Samuel Charles Whitbread	Member of Parliament for Middlesex; 1830–1837; With: George Byng	Succeeded by George Byng; Thomas Wood
Preceded by Daniel O'Connell	Member of Parliament for Kilkenny City; 1837–1841	Succeeded by John O'Connell
Preceded by Patrick Chalmers	Member of Parliament for Montrose Burghs; 1842–1855	Succeeded by William Edward Baxter
Academic offices
Preceded by The 4th Earl Fife	Rector of Marischal College, Aberdeen; 1824–1825	Succeeded by Sir James McGrigor
Preceded by Sir James McGrigor	Rector of Marischal College, Aberdeen; 1828–1829	Succeeded by ?
