= Sighthill Cemetery =

Cemetery in Glasgow, Scotland

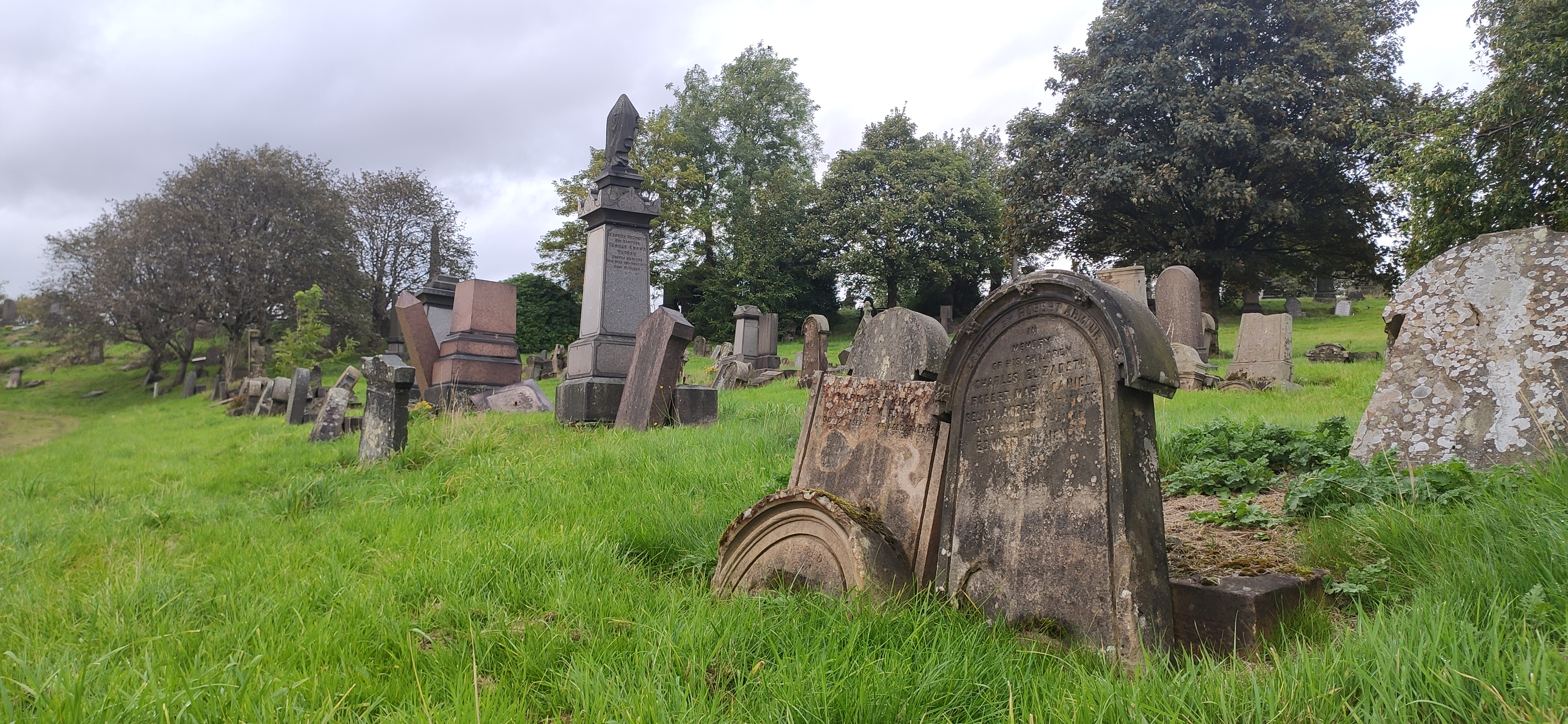
- Interactive map of Sighthill Cemetery

Details
- Established: 1840
- Location: Central Glasgow, Scotland
- Country: United Kingdom
- Coordinates: 55.8770°N 4.2362°W
- Type: Active
- Owned by: Glasgow City Council
- Size: 46 acres
- Find a Grave: Sighthill Cemetery

Sighthill Cemetery is an active cemetery in central Glasgow, Scotland dating from 1840. It has an operational crematorium. It lies within the Sighthill neighbourhood on the A803 Springburn Road between Cowlairs Park and Petershill Park, north of Glasgow city centre, bounded to the north by Keppochhill Road.

== History ==
Sighthill Cemetery was laid out on former farmland linked to the Fountainwell Farm in 1839/40.

The first burial was on 24 April 1840. The cemetery is laid out in an informal pattern with serpentine paths, typical of the first British cemeteries.

The cemetery contains 116 war graves of Commonwealth service personnel of both World Wars.

The cemetery itself is a listed entity, and its entrance lodge with gates and the Martyrs' Monument (see below) and all with Category B status.

== Notable burials ==
- George Arnott Walker Arnott (1799–1868), botanist
- Andrew Bonar (1810–1892), Moderator of the Free Church of Scotland
- Thomas Barclay (1792–1873), Principal of Glasgow University
- James Hedderwick (1814–1897), newspaper editor
- Robert Jamieson (1802–1880), Moderator of the General Assembly of the Church of Scotland
- John Mitchell (1786–1881) was a Glasgow merchant and ship owner, known as "the Father of the Glasgow Town Council".
- John Mossman (1817–1890), sculptor
- William Mossman (1793–1851), sculptor
- James Seaton Reid (1798–1851), Irish-born academic
- Sarah West (1790–1876), actress
- William Rae Wilson Smith (1817–1893), social reformer

== Other memorials ==
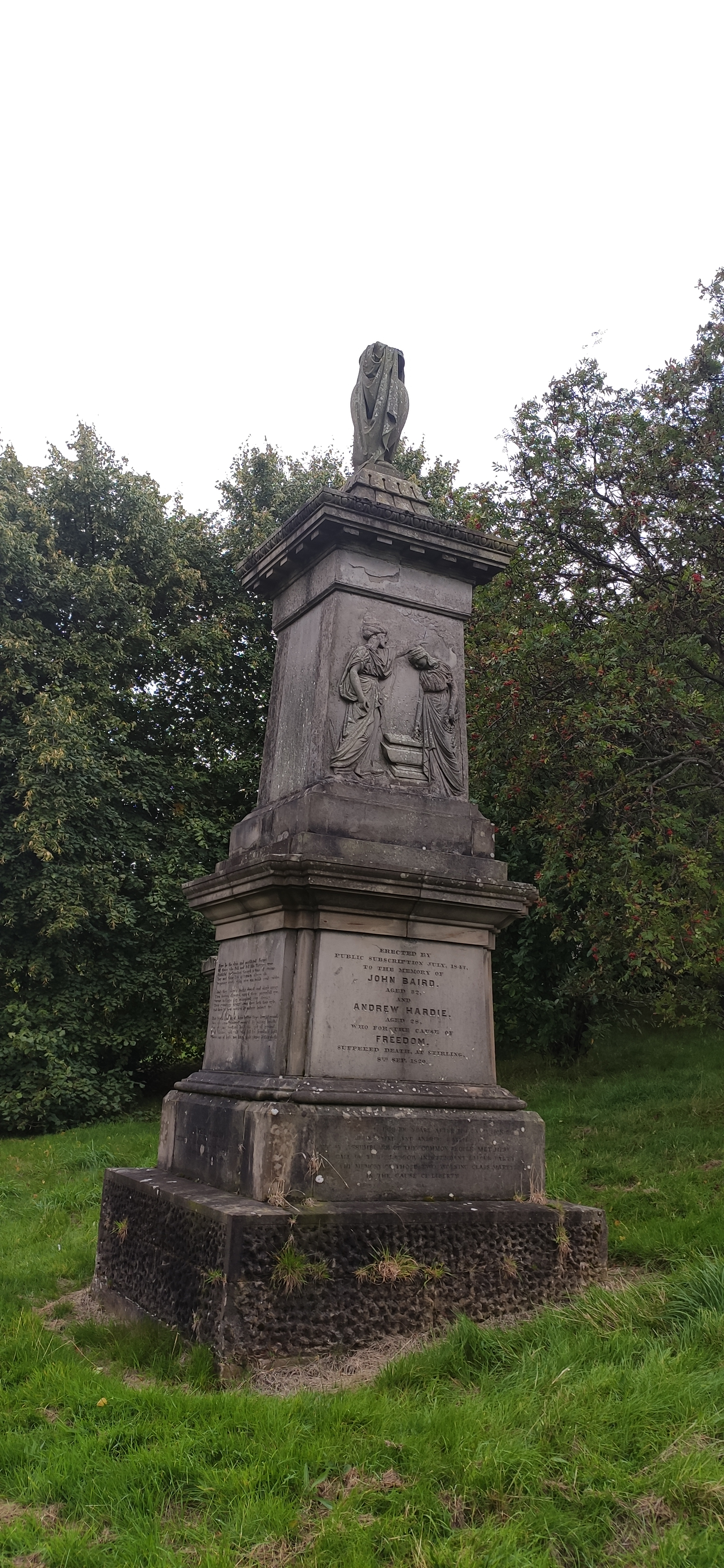
Martyrs Monument in 2024.

Monument dating from 1847 to the leaders of the 1820 Radical War (otherwise known as the 1820 Insurrection), including John Baird (1790–1820) and Andrew Hardie. Although several records state that those executed were re-interred at Sighthill that is neither likely nor what the monument itself says.
