= Sighthill, Glasgow =

Coordinates: 55.8713°N 4.2374°W

Sighthill: Scots: Sichthull
- Location within Glasgow
- OS grid reference: NS601665
- Council area: Glasgow City Council
- Lieutenancy area: Glasgow
- Country: Scotland
- Sovereign state: United Kingdom
- Post town: GLASGOW
- Postcode district: G21
- Dialling code: 0141
- Police: Scotland
- Fire: Scottish
- Ambulance: Scottish
- UK Parliament: Glasgow North East
- Scottish Parliament: Glasgow Maryhill and Springburn

Sighthill is a neighbourhood in the Scottish city of Glasgow. It is situated north of the River Clyde and is part of the wider Springburn district in the north of the city. It is bordered to the north by Cowlairs, to the east by the Springburn Bypass road and the Royston neighbourhood, to the west by the Glasgow to Edinburgh via Falkirk Line (running into Queen Street Station) and to the south by the Townhead interchange of the M8 Motorway.

The district is primarily residential and from the mid-1960s consisted of a housing estate split into two sub-areas – Pinkston to the south and Fountainwell to the north – each with five 20-storey 'slab' tower blocks, plus seven 5-storey maisonette blocks and five rows of tenements in between. Most of these buildings were demolished during the early 21st century and replaced by new housing with associated infrastructure and landscaping.

== History ==
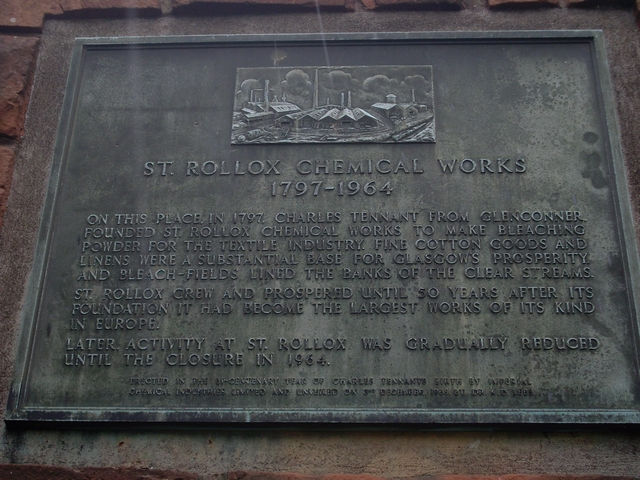
Plaque on the site of the former St. Rollox Chemical Works

The Pinkston area of Sighthill as seen from Townhead

Sighthill formed part of the Springburn Comprehensive Development Area (CDA), and was one of the 20 CDA's around the city where slum housing was completely demolished and replaced by new concrete housing estates based on contemporary architectural practices. The eventual scheme, designed by Crudens consisted of ten colossal 20-storey slab blocks - the housing scheme was built by Glasgow Corporation Housing Department between 1964 and 1969 as part of the city's housing replacement programme – the existing housing in the area itself, consisting of tenements on Springburn Road and just off it at Huntingdon Place, was demolished in the process. Much of the land used for the Pinkston sector was known as the 'Soda Waste', derelict ground on which the United Alkali Company's St Rollox Chemical Works, founded by Charles Tennant and at one time the largest chemical manufacturer in the world, used to dump waste chemicals (particularly hydrogen sulfide, a byproduct of the Leblanc process) until its closure in 1964. The Chemical Works was located on the north bank of the Monkland Canal, immediately east of Port Dundas. The Fountainwell sector was built on a farm of the same name, to the south of Sighthill Cemetery which opened in 1840. Within it stands the memorial to John Baird and Andrew Hardie, the leaders of the 1820 Radical War otherwise known as the 1820 Insurrection. William Mossman and his sculptor sons are buried here.

The Pinkston power station, which had supplied power to the city's tram system and the Subway, was closed in 1975, and its signature cooling tower which dominated the city's skyline was demolished in 1977, with the rest of the complex being removed the year after.

The Sighthill estate later suffered from stigma, as high-rise living went out of fashion. It suffered from low demand since the mid-1970s, despite its proximity to the city centre. Because of its low occupancy rate, Sighthill (along with nearby Red Road) was selected in the late 1990s as a temporary housing location for refugees and asylum seekers. As a result, the neighbourhood had one of the most diverse ethnic makeups in Scotland.

In 2005, letting was suspended in the Fountainwell side of Sighthill as new landlords, Glasgow Housing Association considered the estate's future. The decision was eventually made that Fountainwell should be demolished. The first two blocks were demolished in July 2008 with the three remaining blocks following in November 2009. Sighthill Primary School was also demolished after the tower blocks due to an arson attack shortly after it closed.

The fate of the five remaining Pinkston blocks was debated further. After a campaign by local residents, at least two of the blocks were to be retained and refurbished by Glasgow Housing Association, with three being demolished or sold to private developers. However, Glasgow then bid for the 2018 Youth Olympics and were added to the hosting shortlist, but the successful city had to have its Athletes Village prepared – this resulted in the total demolition of Sighthill's towers to accommodate a new low-rise redevelopment. The Youth Olympics bid was lost, but regeneration continued.

The Sighthill 'Transformational Regeneration Area' includes a new school campus, landscaped green areas and better connectivity to the Forth and Clyde Canal, in addition to approximately 1,000 new housing units for sale, private rental and social rental (much of it marketed as NorthBridge by developers Keepmoat, not to be confused with the same company's slightly earlier Broomview project in Sighthill, Edinburgh, also regenerating a high-rise estate).

Sighthill Bridge, crossing over the M8 Motorway and first planned in 2018, opened in 2023. It replaced an earlier, smaller pedestrian bridge and is known locally as Rusty Bridge due to the use of Cor-Ten steel in its construction. It has a weight of 1,000 tonnes, a span of spanning 74m (80yds) and has been landscaped with seating areas and thousands of plants.

There is also an active Community Council consisting of several committed residents who aim to deal with issues affecting the Sighthill neighbourhood.

== Sighthill stone circle ==
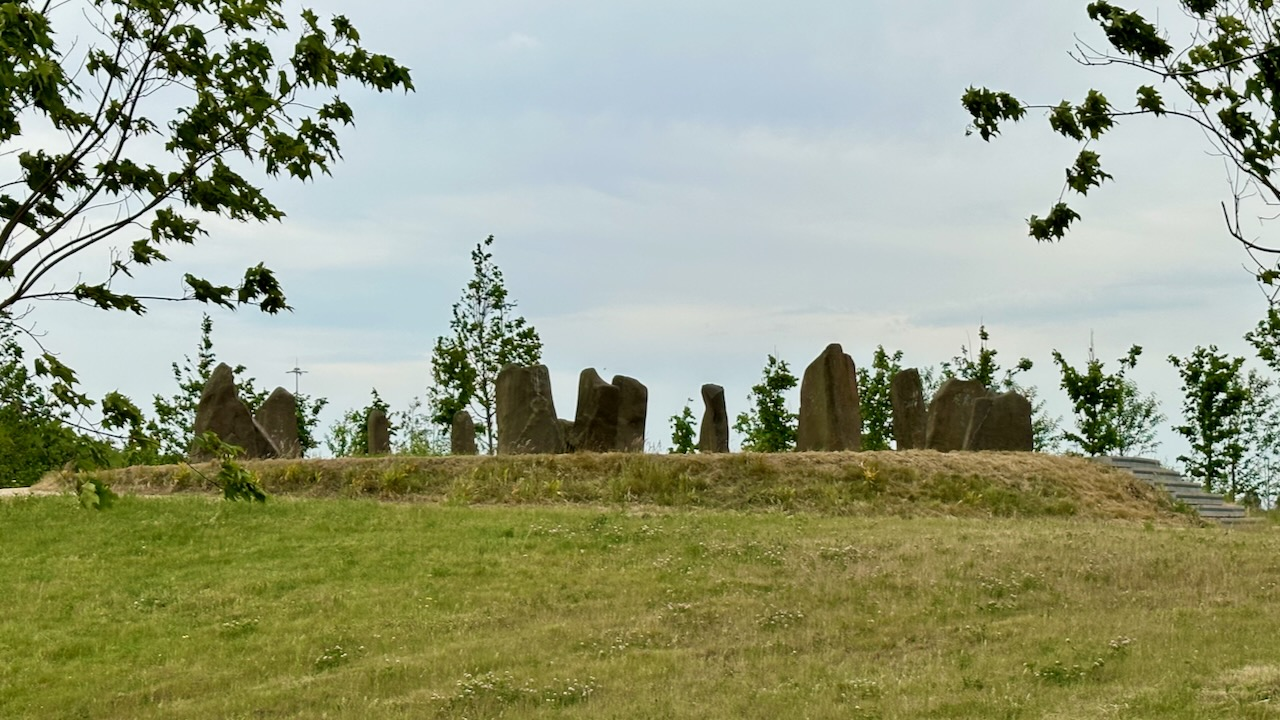
A photo of Sighthill Stone Circle

Sighthill hosts the first astronomically aligned stone circle built in Great Britain for 3,000 years, guided by Duncan Lunan. Built at the highest point of Sighthill Park, the stone circle has a vantage point over the surrounding areas. There are 17 stones in the circle – with 16 forming a circle 30 feet (9 metres) across, and the largest four-tonne stone in the centre. The Sighthill megalith was intended as a tribute to both the ancient megalith builders and the scientists who discovered their significance. It was renovated in the late 2010s along with the rest of the district.

== Tower blocks ==
Each block contained 228 flats (i.e. 2,280 residences in total across the 10 blocks); essentially each block was two towers, each with 19 habitable floors of six flats in a mirror-image of the other and a separate communal entrance, joined together at a central wall. They were 57.6 metres (189 ft) tall.

=== Fountainwell ===
In order of Demolition

- Eagle Heights (2–4 Fountainwell Place) Cruden 1 (demolished: 13 July 2008)
- Barony Heights (16–18 Fountainwell Place) Cruden 2 (demolished: 13 July 2008)
- Tennant Heights (37–49 Fountainwell Avenue) Cruden 3 (demolished: 29 November 2009)
- Phoenix Heights (6–8 Fountainwell Square) Cruden 5 (demolished: 29 November 2009)
- St. Rollox Heights (2–4 Fountainwell Terrace) Cruden 4 (demolished: 29 November 2009)

=== Pinkston ===
- Parson Heights (16–18 Pinkston Drive) (demolished June 2013)
- Huntingdon Heights (17–19 Pinkston Drive) (demolished September/October 2013)
- Pinkston Heights (3–5 Pinkston Drive) (demolished April 2014)
- Crawfurd Heights (31–35 Pinkston Drive) (demolished March–June 2016)
- Hartfield Heights (32–34 Pinkston Drive) (demolished July–October 2016)

== See also ==
- Glasgow tower blocks
- List of tallest voluntarily demolished buildings
- Towers in the park
