= Society of the United Scotsmen =

- Historic Leader: Thomas Muir
- Preceded by: Society of the Friends of the People
- Ideology: Republicanism; Liberalism
- International affiliation: American Revolutionary politics, French Revolutionary Politics

The Society of the United Scotsmen was an organisation formed in Scotland in the late 18th century and sought widespread political reform throughout Great Britain. It grew out of previous radical movements such as the Friends of the People Society, and was inspired by the events of the French and American revolutions. Their aims were largely the same as those of the Society of the United Irishmen.

Societies of United Scotsmen had existed from the early 1790s, but it was only upon a delegation of United Irishmen arriving in Scotland to muster support for their cause that the United Scotsmen became more organised and more overtly revolutionary. The United Scotsmen were particularly adept at gaining support from the working classes of Scotland who stood to gain by becoming politically enfranchised, as the Society sought.

The aim of the Society was universal suffrage and annually elected parliaments, with a strong streak of republicanism running through it as well. By the mid-1790s the society may have had around 3,000 members.

Owing to its aims and activities the United Scotsmen had to remain a secret society, and organised themselves into cells of no more than 16 people which would send delegates to larger bodies on occasion. This way it meant the organisation was more difficult to penetrate, but it also meant that many members did not know other members of the organisation.

The society was further boosted when the Parliament passed the Militia Act 1797 which allowed for the conscription of young men into the army. This proved vastly unpopular with many ordinary Scots, and in August 1797 there were large protests across the country which were brutally suppressed, with many protesters killed (e.g. Massacre of Tranent).

The United Scotsmen hoped to get support from the Dutch as well as the French, and there were plans for the Dutch to land in Scotland with some 50,000 troops and to take over the Scottish Central Belt. However the Royal Navy intercepted a Dutch fleet and defeated them at the Battle of Camperdown in October 1797. Further hopes for French assistance were ruined when a French fleet was dispatched to England in the hope of encouraging English radicals (there was also a Society of the United Englishmen) to rise against His Majesty's Government. However radical activity was not as entrenched there as in Scotland, or Ireland in particular. If they had dispatched the fleet to either of these countries then they may have met with more success.

Various leaders of the United Scotsmen were arrested and tried. For example, George Mealmaker was sentenced to 14 years transportation. Other leaders such as Robert Jaffrey, David Black, James Paterson and William Maxwell were all found guilty of seditious activity. The last record of a United Scotsmen member having been tried before the courts was the trial in 1802 of Thomas Wilson. The United Scotsmen were (along with the United Irishmen) pronounced an illegal organisation and legal measures tightened up control of the press as well to halt radical activity.

However, the radical activity continued in Scotland and in 1820 there was another radical rising (one of whose leaders, James Wilson, had been a member of the United Scotsmen).
