= Retrenchment (disambiguation) =

Retrenchment is a political theory.

Retrenchment may refer also to:

- Retrenchment (labour), a term for "layoff" in South Africa, and informally in other countries
- Retrenchment (computing)
- Retrenchment (military), a technical term in military fortification
