= Bonnymuir =

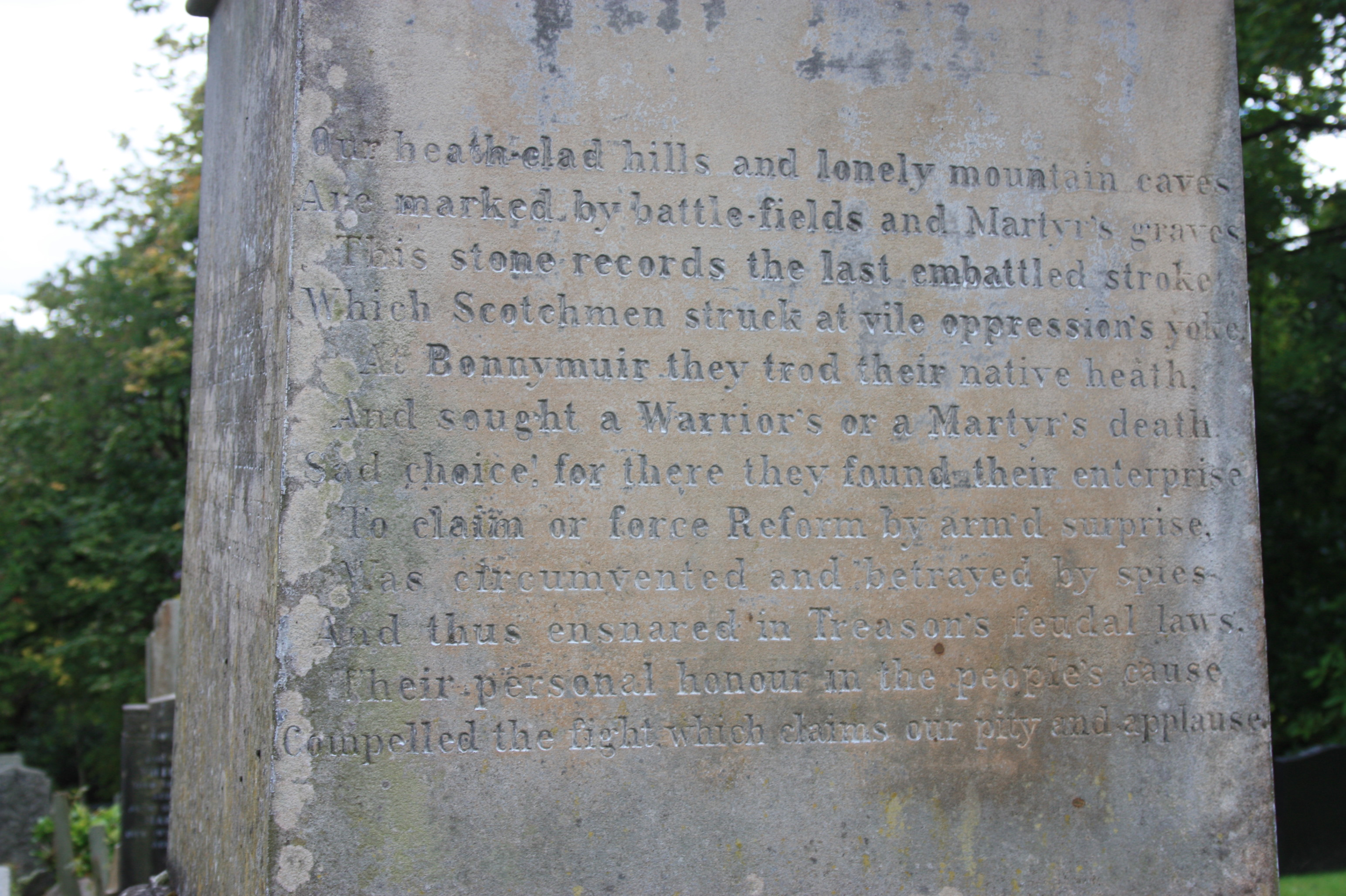
The Bonnymuir inscription; memorial to the ringleaders Andrew Hardie and John Baird in Woodside Cemetery, Paisley, Renfrewshire

Bonnymuir was a moorland ("bonny muir" effectively means "pretty moorland" in Scots) area near the town of Bonnybridge in Scotland. Today, it has mostly become either housing or farmland.

It was a significant location in the Radical War of 1820. The effects of the Industrial Revolution in the early 19th century, combined with an economic downturn following the Napoleonic War, encouraged political unrest (see Peterloo, Chartism). In 1820, several agitators were arrested on suspicion of plotting an insurrection. A large memorial stone to mark the 200th anniversary of the Battle of Bonnymuir was unveiled in 2021.

A strike of some 60,000 workers followed in April 1820, mainly in the west of Scotland, and a "provisional government" was declared in Glasgow. The Carron Ironworks was besieged by 40 militants with the intention of obtaining armaments; they were subsequently joined by reinforcements from Stirling. They were overcome by Scottish troops of the Stirlingshire Yeomanry at Bonnymuir and 47 were arraigned for treason. The ringleaders, Andrew Hardie, James Wilson and John Baird were executed. Thomas McCulloch, John Barr, William Smith, Benjamin Moir, Allan Murchie, Alexander Latimer, Alexander Johnson, Andrew White, David Thomson, James Wright, William Clackson, Thomas Pike, Robert Gray, James Clelland, Alexander Hart, Thomas McFarlane, John Anderson and William Crawford were sentenced to penal transportation. Two were found not guilty and the rest were never tried.
