= Andrew Hardie =

Andrew Hardie may refer to:

- Andrew Hardie, Baron Hardie (born 1946), Scottish Labour Party politician and Government minister
- Andrew Hardie (radical), Scottish radical, executed for his part in Radical War of 1820

== See also ==
- Andy Hardy, fictional character
