= William Clackson =

Convict transported to Australia

William Clackson (c. 1799–?) was a shoemaker living in Glasgow at the time of the "Radical War" of 1820. He was sentenced to death for his part in the uprising, but this was subsequently commuted to transportation to New South Wales. He left Scotland in the convict ship Speke on 22 December 1820.

Clackson arrived in Australia on 18 May 1821. In the 1828 census he is recorded, age 29, as working as a shoemaker in Sydney, living with his wife Margaret, aged 28, who arrived in the colony on the Orpheus in 1826.

On 10 August 1835 Clackson was granted, in common with the other Bonnymuir insurgents, an absolute pardon.
