= James Wilson (revolutionary) =

Scottish revolutionary (1760–1820)

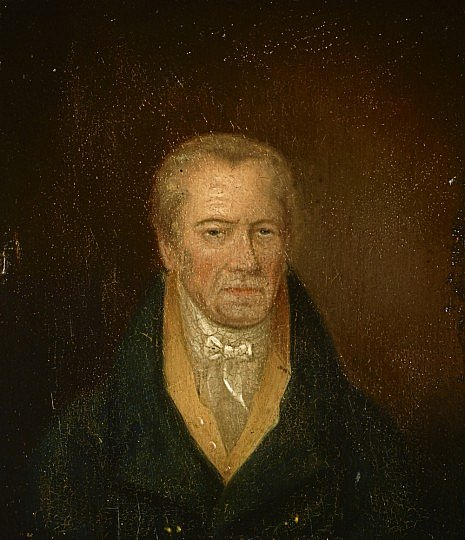
Portrait of Wilson, c.1810

James Wilson (3 September 1760 – 30 August 1820), commonly known as "Purly Wilson", was a Scottish revolutionary, born in the parish of Avondale in Scotland, a prominent figure in the Radical movement seeking electoral reform. He was a weaver from the town of Strathaven in Lanarkshire, but as the Industrial Revolution affected the weaving trade he had to find alternative work.

A free-thinking man, he was skeptical of religion and disliked the government of the day. He read Thomas Paine's Rights of Man and started to become active in lobbying for political reform. When the Society of the Friends of the People was formed by a group of Whigs, he joined the Strathaven branch, although he does not appear to have been especially active initially; but when it became clear that the local nobleman, the Duke of Hamilton, objected to the aims of the Friends of the People, many members withdrew and Wilson became more active in trying to maintain the local society.

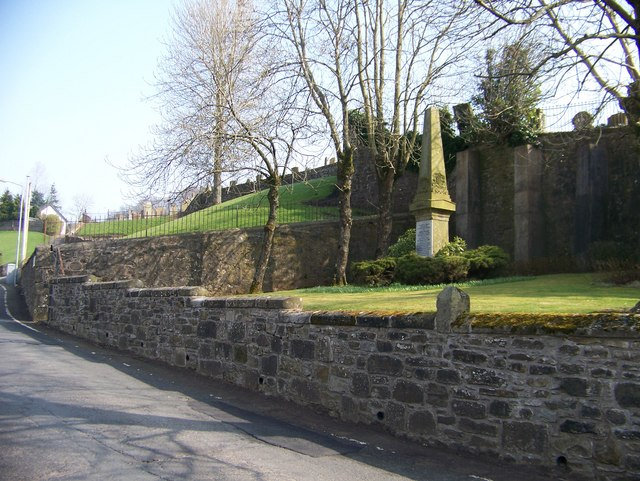
The 1846 monument to James Wilson in Strathaven, (2009)

The Friends of the People eventually folded across the country, but Wilson maintained his Radical reformist activities. In the aftermath of the Napoleonic Wars many returning soldiers faced unemployment. In such an environment the scope for radical activity was ripe.

In 1816 some 40,000 people assembled near Glasgow to demand an improvement to their social and political conditions. In 1817 the first edition of the satirical reformist publication The Black Dwarf was published and Wilson and his Radical colleagues would read this at their continued meetings.

Radical activities continued in the West of Scotland around Glasgow, and the government employed a number of spies to infiltrate the meetings and associations of activists. Troops were stationed in Glasgow, and government spies encouraged Radicals to rise, telling them that England too was in the throes of Radical insurrection. This was a deliberate attempt to cause Radical leaders to rise up where they could then be arrested. On 1 April 1820 a notice was posted in Glasgow and surrounding areas urging people to rise against the British government, signed by the Organising Committee for a Provisional Government, the start of the so-called Radical War.

Wilson responded in exactly the manner predicted by the government. He led a band of Radicals from Strathaven marching towards Glasgow. Wilson was initially wary of the information presented that a rising was taking place (he was informed of the rising by a government agent), and sent a man to visit the rallying point at Cathkin Braes to see if it was true that there was a force of French troops awaiting to assist the radicals.

Despite there being no French troops in sight, the Radicals in Strathaven were keen to march, so Wilson led them towards the city, with the marchers carrying a banner declaring, Scotland Free or a Desart. They marched overnight, and by the next day it was apparent to them by now that there was no mass insurrection. Disappointed and dejected, they returned to Strathaven.

Upon his return Wilson was arrested on a charge of high treason. On 24 July 1820, he was found guilty of treason after proceedings before a commission of oyer and terminer and was sentenced to death. He was hanged and beheaded on 30 August 1820.

In 1846 a monument to Wilson was erected in Strathaven.

== See also ==
- John Baird
- Andrew Hardie
