= Timeline of Scottish nationalism =

Flag of Scotland

Scotland

This is a timeline of events in the history of Scottish nationalism.

843

843	King Kenneth I of the Scots becomes king of the Picts, uniting the two as the Kingdom of Alba.

1603

24 March 1603	James VI of Scotland accedes to the English throne as James I in the Union of the Crowns.

1707

1 May 1707	Act of Union is enacted, unifying Scotland with England.

1820

1–8 April 1820	The Scottish Insurrection takes place, with the aim of installing a provisional government in Scotland.

1979

1 March 1979	A referendum finds a majority in favour of a Scottish parliament, though this is not acted upon by the British Government.

1997

11 September 1997	A second referendum on a Scottish parliament passes.

1999

12 May 1999	The Scottish Parliament is reconvened.

2014

18 September 2014	A referendum on whether or not Scotland should become independent is held, with the anti independence campaign ultimately winning with 55% of the vote.
