= Retrenchment =

Political term

Retrenchment (French: retrenchment, an old form of retranchement, from retrancher, to cut down, cut short) is an act of cutting down or reduction, particularly of public expenditure.

== Political usage ==
The word is familiar in its most general sense from the motto for the Gladstonian Liberal party in British politics, "Peace, Retrenchment and Reform."

The 1906 Liberal landslide manifesto was launched with this slogan:

Expenditure calls for taxes, and taxes are the plaything of the tariff reformer. Militarism, extravagance, protection are weeds which grow in the same field, and if you want to clear the field for honest cultivation you must root them all out. For my own part, I do not believe that we should have been confronted by the spectre of protection if it had not been for the South African war. ... Depend upon it that in fighting for our open ports and for the cheap food and material upon which the welfare of the people and the prosperity of our commerce depend we are fighting against those powers, privileges, injustices, and monopolies which are unalterably opposed to the triumph of democratic principles.

== See also ==
- Retrenchment (computing)
- Retrenchment (military)
