= James Seaton Reid =

Irish presbyterian minister and church historian

James Seaton Reid, M.A. and D.D. (1798–1851) was an Irish presbyterian minister and church historian.

== Life ==
Born in Lurgan, County Armagh, he was the son of Forest Reid, master of a grammar school there, and Mary Weir, his wife. Left fatherless at an early age, James spent much of his youth at Ramelton, County Donegal, under the care of his brother Edward, minister of the Presbyterian congregation there. At the age of fifteen he entered the University of Glasgow, where he graduated M.A. in 1816, and afterwards attended the divinity hall.

He was licensed to preach by the presbytery of Letterkenny in 1818, and in the following year was ordained, and inducted to the presbyterian church of Donegore, County Antrim. Four years later he was called to the presbyterian church at Carrickfergus. He began preparation for a history of the Irish presbyterian church, collecting materials from the records of church courts and other manuscripts, and visiting Dublin, London, and Edinburgh to pursue his researches in libraries.

In 1827 he was unanimously elected moderator of the Synod of Ulster, aged 28. It was a time of bitter controversy, and, though himself an upholder of the catholic doctrine of the Trinity, Reid had the respect of the Arian party, which was then on the eve of secession. During his term of office he preached before the synod a sermon on the controversy, which he published, with a preface and historical notes. In 1829 the Orthodox Presbyterian was started by Reid and others, and he was a frequent contributor. In 1833 the University of Glasgow conferred on him the honorary degree of D.D. In 1837 he was appointed professor of ecclesiastical history, church government, and pastoral theology, in the Royal Belfast Academical Institution.

In April 1841 he was presented by Queen Victoria as Professorship of Ecclesiastical History in the University of Glasgow in place of Rev Prof William McTurk. He spent part of 1845 and of 1846 in Europe, visiting Germany, France, and Italy.

Reid died at Belmont House in Edinburgh on 26 March 1851 and is buried in Sighthill Cemetery in Glasgow.

== Works ==
In 1834 Reid published the first volume of the History of the Presbyterian Church in Ireland. It was recognised as valuable, and the Royal Irish Academy unanimously elected him a member. The second volume, containing original documents relating to the War of the Three Kingdoms and Oliver Cromwell's rule in Ireland, appeared in 1837, Some of the third volume of his History was ready for the press on his death, and it was completed by William Dool Killen.

Reid published in 1824 a Brief Account of the Irish Presbyterian Church in the Form of Question and Answer; The Sabbath, a Tract for the Times; and Seven Letters to Dr. Elrington, Professor of Divinity in Trinity College, Dublin, "occasioned by his Animadversions in his ‘Life of Ussher’ on certain Passages in the History of the Presbyterian Church in Ireland", Glasgow, 1849 (addressed to Charles Richard Elrington). In 1848 he edited James Murdock's translation of Johann Lorenz von Mosheim's Church History, to which he added notes.

== Family ==
Reid married, in February 1826, Elizabeth Arrott (d.1871), daughter of Samuel Arrott, a Belfast surgeon, and had eleven children, of whom five survived him. In acknowledgment of his literary services, a pension was settled by government on his widow and family.

Academic offices
New title	Professor of Church History of the Synod of Ulster (1837-40) and of the Presbyterian Church in Ireland (1840-41); 1837-41	Succeeded by William Dool Killen
