= John Mitchell (merchant) =

Scottish merchant and ship owner (1786–1881)

John Mitchell (1786–1881) was a Scottish merchant and ship owner in Glasgow, known as "the Father of the Glasgow Town Council".

== Merchant ==
He was the son of a Dalkeith cork manufacturer, born 10 August 1786, who in 1808 set up in business in Glasgow and became the biggest cork importer in Britain, pioneering trade between Portugal and the Clyde. John Mitchell & Sons was founded in 1813 until taken over by William Rankin & Sons in 1889.

== Ship owner ==
He was also a ship owner, owner of the first ocean-going ship, 'Lusitania' (1832), to be built in Glasgow. On her first voyage to Oporto from Broomielaw she carried 172 men to join the forces of Don Pedro.

The 'John Mitchell' (1839) also took passengers to Australia in 1849 and the 'Catherine Mitchell' in the 1850s.

He was owner of the 'Hamilla Mitchell' launched in 1864 and built by Denny & Rankin, Dumbarton, the second ship named after his daughter. She was wrecked on the Leuconna Rock near Shanghai in August 1869 with a cargo valued at £150,000 and £50,000 in coins. The crew survived. Much of the cargo was salvaged using specialised diving equipment and after escaping Chinese pirates.

Date	Name	Builder	Location	Note
1832	Lusitania	Robert Barclay	Glasgow	Wood Sailing Vessel Brigantine
1835	Dalkeith	Hunter & Dow	Glasgow	Wood Sailing Vessel Schooner
1835	Lisbon	Robert Barclay	Glasgow	Wood Sailing Vessel Schooner
1837	Ann Mitchell	Hunter & Dow	Glasgow	Wood Sailing Vessel Schooner
1839	John Mitchell	Alexander Stephen	Arbroath	Wood Sailing Vessel 3 masted Ship
1850	Hamilla Mitchell	Lunan & Robertson	Peterhead	Wood Sailing Vessel 3 masted Ship
1852	Catherine Mitchell	Archibald McMillan & Son	Dumbarton	Wood Sailing Vessel 3 Masted Ship
1852	Janet Mitchell	Portland Shipbuilding Co.	Troon	Wood Sailing Vessel 3 Masted Ship
1854	The Earl of Eglinton	Portland Shipbuilding Co.	Troon	Wood Sailing Vessel 3 Masted Ship
1856	Victor Emmanuel	Alexander Denny	Dumbarton	Iron Screw Steamer
1864	Hamilla Mitchell	Denny & Rankin	Dumbarton	Iron Sailing Vessel 3 Masted Ship
1866	Tagus	Thomas Adamson	Alloa	Wood Sailing Vessel 3 Masted Barque

== Career ==
He was an elder in the Glasgow Presbytery for fifty years, member of the Town Council since the Municipal Reform Bill of 1833 except for four years when he was Provost of Gorbals, Special Commissioner for Glasgow when Peel introduced the Income Tax Bill, a Magistrate and a founder and director of the Clydesdale Bank. On the council he supported the creation of Sighthill Cemetery and the construction of the Portland Street Suspension Bridge. He held the honorary office of Master of Works in 1863.

== Private life ==
He first lived in Stockwell Street. In 1852 he purchased Moore Park, Govan, which is where he died 5 December 1881. His business address was also given as 54 Great Clyde street and East Clyde Street. He was married to Janet Hamilton in 1813.

On his death he left bequests to various charities in his will. He was interred at Sighthill Cemetery after a funeral at St George's Church.
