= Hamilla Mitchell =

Shipwreck and treasure recovery

The Hamilla Mitchell was a ship owned by Thomas Mitchell of Glasgow, which left Gravesend, England on 5 April 1869 and sank on the Leuconna Rock near Shanghai in August 1869 whilst carrying cargo valued at £150,000 and £50,000 in coins. The crew survived. A large amount of the cargo was subsequently salvaged using specialised diving equipment and after escaping Chinese pirates.

== Recovery of treasure ==
The underwriters paid Captain Lodge to recover the treasure, who then secured the services of divers Robert Ridyard and William Penk of Liverpool. They made their way to Shanghai and chartered a small vessel to approach the Hamilla Mitchell. As the Hamilla Mitchell was among high rocks, they then used the small boat that they had towed. Using specialised diving apparatus, Ridyard and Penk located the Hamilla Mitchell with its stern over-hanging deep water. Ridyard managed to break into the strong room. Inside the strong room were treasure chests, many of which had fallen apart, with the floor covered in gold coins. Ridyard undertook 4 trips down to the strong room and was able to bring to the surface £40,000 coins, consisting of at least 64 boxes After resurfacing, Captain Lodge, Ridyard and Penk became aware of Chinese pirate junks in large numbers pursuing them. The pirates pursued them until sunset, when they were able to safety get to Shanghai with their treasure. A newspaper article from 1910 states that: "The balance was recovered some time later."

== Features and history ==
The Hamilla Mitchell was owned by Thomas Mitchell of Glasgow and commanded by Captain Branscombe. It was made out of iron and weighed almost 1000 tons. She had been launched in 1864 and built by Denny & Rankin, Dumbarton, the second ship of that name for John Mitchell named after his daughter. Her first voyage was to New Zealand.
