= William Hardin Burnley =

William Hardin Burnley (21 April 1780 – 29 December 1850) was an American-born British-Trinidadian planter who was the largest slave-owner in Trinidad in the nineteenth century.

Born in New York City, he was the son of Hardin Burnley (1741–1823) and his wife, Catherine, née Maitland (1752/3–1827). The family moved to London in 1786, and Burnley attended Harrow School in 1793. He visited Trinidad in 1793, and eventually settled on the island.

== Selected publications ==
- Observations on the present condition of the island of Trinidad, and the actual state of the experiment of negro emancipation, 1842.

== See also ==
- Hardin Burnley
