= Samuel Hunter (editor) =

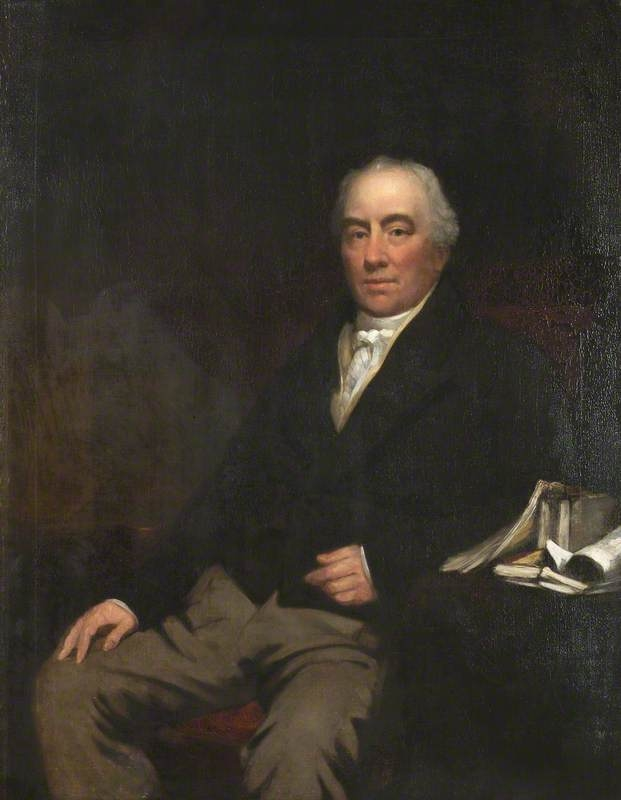
Portrait by Daniel Macnee

Samuel Hunter (19 March 1769 – 9 June 1839) was a Scottish journalist, magistrate and officer of yeomanry. He was the editor of the Glasgow Herald.

== Life ==
He was born on 19 March 1769 in the manse of Stoneykirk, Wigtownshire the son of Rev John Hunter (1716–1781) and his second wife Margaret McHarg (d. 1786).

Receiving his elementary education there, he qualified as a surgeon at Glasgow University, and for a time, about the end of the 18th century, practised his profession in Ireland. Somewhat later he acted as captain in the North Lowland Regiment of fencibles, and settled in Glasgow.

On 10 January 1803 Hunter became editor and co-proprietor of the Glasgow Herald and Advertiser, to which he then for 34 years spent most of his time running. Soon afterwards, in a French invasion scare, he figured first as major in a corps of gentlemen sharpshooters, and secondly as colonel commandant of the fourth regiment of Highland local militia.

Sitting on Glasgow town council, Hunter also rose to be a magistrate. He was an implacable opponent of political reform and in 1820 fresh military activity in response to radical unrest brought him forward as commander of a choice corps of gentlemen known as the Glasgow Sharpshooters. From this time till 1837, when he retired from the Herald—then a sheet of four pages, appearing bi-weekly—he was one of the most prominent Glasgow citizens.

After retiring Hunter settled at Rothesay, and he died on 9 June 1839 whilst visiting his nephew, Rev Dr Archibald Blair Campbell, D.D., parish minister of Kilwinning, Ayrshire. He was buried in Kilwinning churchyard.
