= Peace, Retrenchment and Reform =

Peace, Retrenchment and Reform was a political slogan used in early-19th-century British politics by Whigs, Radicals and Liberals.

The historian R. B. McCallum in his history of the Liberal Party defined the meaning of the slogan:

The critical, conscience-searching attitude to foreign and imperial affairs, the willingness to see the right triumph over national sentiment... was sheer idealism, the belief that war was wrong and that in the new world of great inventions and world-wide trade civilised nations should not require to settle difference by war.... Retrenchment... meant the saving of the resources of the individual from the grasp of the state taxation system. It was held as a general truth that wealth left in the hands of private persons would be more fruitfully used than if used by the state....[Liberals] had most vigorously attacked sinecures and abuses; it was they who had established free trade which seemed the best guarantee of economic development and it was they who more than any others discouraged expense on armaments, the most wasteful and unproductive of all expenditure.... Reform... had a particular and narrower use as meaning reform of the franchise.... More broadly it meant improvement in the method and art of government and the removal of any restriction or disqualification that fell on any particular class or sect.

In 1794, the Radical Daniel Stuart published his pamphlet Peace and Reform, Against War and Corruption and in 1796, the Whig George Tierney stood for election a platform of "Peace and Reform". The relentless campaign by the Radical MP Joseph Hume against what he considered wasteful and extravagant government expenditure in the 1820s caused the word "retrenchment" to be added to "peace and reform". The Whig government of Earl Grey was elected to office on the slogan "Peace, Retrenchment and Reform" in 1830. The Liberals under William Ewart Gladstone won the 1880 general election on the slogan, as did the Liberals under Sir Henry Campbell-Bannerman in 1906.

The Radical MP John Bright said in 1859, "I am for 'Peace, retrenchment, and reform', the watchword of the great Liberal party 30 years ago. Whosoever may abandon the cause I shall never pronounce another Shibboleth, but as long as the old flag floats in the air I shall be found a steadfast soldier in the foremost ranks".
