= Retrenchment (computing) =

Retrenchment is a technique associated with formal methods that was introduced to address some of the perceived limitations of formal, model based refinement, for situations in which refinement might be regarded as desirable in principle, but turned out to be unusable, or nearly unusable, in practice. It was primarily developed at the School of Computer Science, University of Manchester. The most up to date perspective is in the ACM TOSEM article below.
