= Radical War =

1820 labour dispute in Scotland

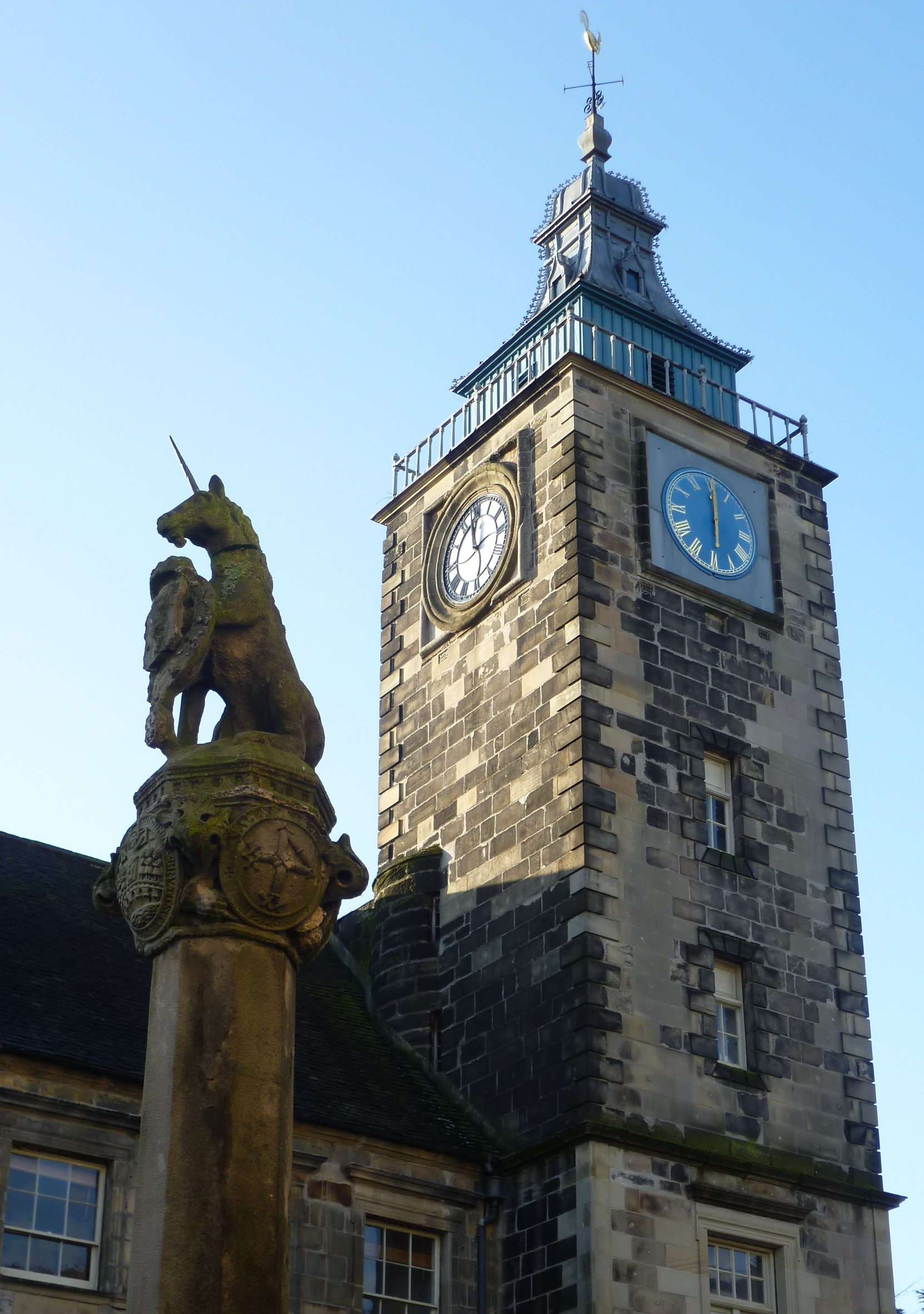
- Stirling Tolbooth and Cross where a plaque commemorates Baird and Hardie
- Date: 1–8 April 1820
- Location: Western Central Scotland
- Caused by: High unemployment; High food prices; Unfair working conditions; Unresponsive government
- Goals: Electoral reform; More responsive government
- Result: Dissent quashed by Army; Trials for leaders of protests; Glasgow granted greater representation in parliament in 1832

Parties
British Government: British Army; Rifle Brigade; 83rd Regiment of Foot; 7th Hussars; 10th Hussars; Samuel Hunter's Glasgow Sharpshooters	Various Groups: Committee of Organisation for Forming a Provisional Government

Lead figures
Earl of Liverpool; Thomas Bradford; Henry Monteith; Samuel Hunter	Non-centralised leadership: John Baird (executed); Andrew Hardie (executed); James Wilson (executed); James Clelland; Duncan Turner; George Kinloch; Numerous others

Casualties
- Charged: 88 charged with treasons Many leaders executed Absolute pardon granted on 10 August 1835 (15 years later); 20 radicals sentenced to penal transportation

The Radical War, also known as the Scottish Insurrection of 1820, was a week of strikes and unrest in Scotland, a culmination of Radical demands for reform in the United Kingdom of Great Britain and Ireland which had become prominent in the early years of the French Revolution, but had then been repressed during the long Napoleonic Wars.

An economic downturn after the wars ended brought increasing unrest, but the root cause was the Industrial Revolution. Artisan workers, particularly weavers in Scotland, sought action to force the government to enact Luddite protective restrictions. Gentry fearing revolutionary horrors recruited militia and the government deployed an apparatus of spies, informers and agents provocateurs to stamp out the movement.

A Committee of Organisation for Forming a Provisional Government put placards around the streets of Glasgow late on Saturday 1 April, calling for an immediate national strike. On Monday, 3 April, work stopped in a wide area of central Scotland and, in a swirl of disorderly events, a small group marched towards the Carron Company ironworks to seize weapons, but, while stopped at Bonnymuir, they were confronted by a detachment of hussars. Another small group from Strathaven marched to meet a rumoured larger force, but were warned of an ambush and dispersed. Militia taking prisoners to Greenock jail were attacked by local people and the prisoners released. James Wilson of Strathaven was singled out as a leader of the march there, and was executed by hanging at Glasgow, then decapitated. Of those arrested by government troops at Bonnymuir, John Baird and Andrew Hardie were similarly executed at Stirling after making short defiant speeches. Twenty other Radicals were sentenced to penal transportation.

It was suspected that government agents had actively fomented the unrest to bring radicals into the open. The insurrection was largely forgotten as attention focused on better publicised Radical events in England. Two years later, enthusiasm for the visit of King George IV to Scotland successfully boosted loyalist sentiment, ushering in a new-found Scottish national identity.

== Background ==
In the 18th century, artisans such as handloom weavers, shoemakers, smiths and wrights worked to commission and so could set their own hours of work, which often left them time to read and debate with friends what they had read. The national Presbyterian Church of Scotland was founded on egalitarian attitudes and rights of the individual to make principled judgements, and so encouraged disputatious habits and preoccupation with "rights", as well as continuing the Scottish education tradition which achieved more widespread literacy at that time than other countries. In Scotland, only 1 in 250 people had the right to vote and these artisans were ready to join the Radical movement in welcoming the American Revolution and the French Revolution, and be influenced by Thomas Paine's The Rights of Man. The Scottish Society of the Friends of the People held a series of "Conventions" in 1792 and 1793. The government reacted harshly, sentencing successive leaders to penal transportation, and, in 1793, Dundee Unitarian minister Thomas Fysshe Palmer was also given 7 years transportation for helping to prepare and distribute reform tracts. Dissent went underground with the United Scotsmen whose activities were curbed with the trial of George Mealmaker in 1798.

Between 1800 and 1808, the earnings of weavers were halved, and, in 1812, they petitioned for an increase which was granted by the magistrates. However, the employers refused to pay so the weavers called a strike which lasted for nine weeks with the support of a "National Committee of Scottish Union Societies", organised in a similar way to the United Scotsmen ("Unions" being area related, not Trade Unions). The authorities were further alarmed and set up spies and informers to forestall any further reformist activity. Between then and 1815, Major John Cartwright made visits to establish radical Hampden Clubs across Scotland.

=== Post war unrest ===
The end of the Napoleonic Wars brought economic depression. In 1816, some 40,000 people attended a meeting on Glasgow Green to demand more representative government and an end to the Corn Laws which kept food prices high. The Industrial Revolution affected handloom weavers in particular, and unrest grew despite attempts by the authorities to employ the workless and to open relief centres to relieve hardship. Government agents brought conspiracy trials to court in 1816 and 1817.

The Peterloo Massacre of August 1819 sparked protest demonstrations across Britain. In Scotland, a memorial rally in Paisley on 11 September led to a week of rioting and cavalry were used to control around 5,000 "Radicals". Protest meetings were held in Stirling, Airdrie, Renfrewshire, Ayrshire and Fife, mainly in weaving areas. On 13 December, the "Radical Laird" Kinloch was arrested for addressing a mass meeting on Magdalen Green in Dundee, but he escaped and fled abroad.

The gentry feared that the kind of revolutionary turmoil that had been seen in France and Ireland could take place in Britain, and there was a great recruiting of volunteer regiments through the Scottish lowlands and Scottish Borders. Walter Scott urged his Borders neighbours to "appeal at this crisis to the good sense and loyalty of the lower orders... All you have to do is sound the men, and mark down those who seem zealous. They will perhaps have to fight with the pitmen and colliers of Northumbria for defence of their firesides, for those literal blackguards are got beyond the management of their own people."

== The "Radical War" ==
Prominent locations in the Radical War

1820 saw Easter week uprisings all over Great Britain. As the year began, the government, frightened by the "Cato Street Conspiracy" in London, acted to suppress reform agitation and drew on its apparatus of spies and agents provocateurs in Scotland. A 28-man Radical Committee for organising a Provisional Government elected by delegates of local "unions" elected officers and decided to arrange military training for its supporters, giving some responsibility for the training programme to a Condorrat weaver with army experience, John Baird. On 18 March Mitchell of the Glasgow police notified the Home Secretary that "a meeting of the organising committee of the rabble... is due in this vicinity in a few days hence."

On 21 March, the Committee met in a Glasgow tavern. The weaver John King left the meeting early, shortly before a raid in which the Committee was secretly arrested. Mitchell reported on 25 March that those arrested had "confessed their audacious plot to sever the Kingdom of Scotland from that of England and restore the ancient Scottish Parliament... If some plan were conceived by which the disaffected could be lured out of their lairs - being made to think that the day of "liberty" had come - we could catch them abroad and undefended... few know of the apprehension of the leaders... so no suspicion would attach itself to the plan at all. Our informants have infiltrated the disaffected's committees and organisation, and in a few days you shall judge the results." King, Craig, Turner and Lees would now be repeatedly involved in organising agitation.

At a meeting on 22 March, the 15 to 20 people present included the weavers John King and John Craig, the tin-smith Duncan Turner, and "an Englishman" called Lees. John King told them that a rising was imminent and all present should hold themselves in enthusiastic readiness for the call to arms. The next day some of them met on Glasgow Green then moved on to Rutherglen where Turner revealed plans to establish a Provisional Government, got those present to resolve to "act accordingly", then gave over a copy of a draft Proclamation to be delivered to a printer. Lees, King and Turner went round encouraging supporters to make pikes for the battles. On Saturday 1 April, Craig and Lees collected the prints which Lees had paid for the previous day. By the morning of Sunday 2 April copies of the Proclamation were displayed throughout Glasgow.

=== Proclamation ===
The Proclamation, signed "By order of the Committee of Organisation for forming a Provisional Government. Glasgow April 1st. 1820.", included references to the English Magna Carta and the English Bill of Rights.

"Friends and Countrymen! Rouse from that torpid state in which we have sunk for so many years, we are at length compelled from the extremity of our sufferings, and the contempt heaped upon our petitions for redress, to assert our rights at the hazard of our lives." by "taking up arms for the redress of our common grievances". "Equality of rights (not of property)... Liberty or Death is our motto, and we have sworn to return home in triumph - or return no more... we earnestly request all to desist from their labour from and after this day, the first of April [until] in possession of those rights..." It called for a rising "To show the world that we are not that lawless, sanguinary rabble which our oppressors would persuade the higher circles we are but a brave and generous people determined to be free."

A footnote added: "Britons – God – Justice – the wish of all good men, are with us. Join together and make it one good cause, and the nations of the earth shall hail the day when the Standard of Liberty shall be raised on its native soil."

=== Strike and unrest ===
On Monday 3 April, work stopped, particularly in weaving communities, over a wide area of central Scotland including Stirlingshire, Dunbartonshire, Renfrewshire, Lanarkshire and Ayrshire, with an estimated total of around 60,000 stopping work.

Reports came in that men were carrying out military drill at points round Glasgow, foundries and forges had been raided, and iron files and dyer's poles taken to make pikes. In Kilbarchan soldiers found men making pikes, in Stewarton around 60 strikers were dispersed, in Balfron around 200 men had assembled for some sort of action. Pikes, gunpowder and weapons called "wasps" (a sort of javelin) and "clegs" (a barbed shuttlecock to throw at horses) were offered for sale.

Rumours spread that England was in arms for the cause of reform and that an army was mustering at Campsie commanded by Marshal MacDonald, a Marshal of France and son of a Jacobite refugee family, to join forces with 50,000 French soldiers at Cathkin Braes under Kinloch, the fugitive "Radical laird" from Dundee.

In Paisley the local reformers' committee met under command of their drill instructor, but scattered when Paisley was put under curfew.

Government troops were ready in Glasgow, including the Rifle Brigade, the 83rd Regiment of Foot, the 7th and 10th Hussars and Samuel Hunter's Glasgow Sharpshooters. In the evening 300 radicals briefly skirmished with a party "of cavalry", but no one came to harm that day.

=== March on Carron ===
In Glasgow, John Craig led around 30 men to make for the Carron Company ironworks in Falkirk, Stirlingshire, telling them that weapons would be there for the taking, but the group scattered when intercepted by a police patrol. By coincidence a detachment of Hussars was waiting in ambush with the intention of catching men marching off from Glasgow to Carron, but was disappointed. Craig was caught, brought before a magistrate and fined, but the magistrate paid his fine for him.

On the next day, Tuesday 4 April, Duncan Turner assembled around 60 men to march to Carron, while he carried out organising work elsewhere. Half the group dropped out, the rest accepted his assurances that they would pick up supporters along the way. Their leader Andrew Hardie was given a torn half card to be matched with the other half in the possession of a supporter in Condorrat, on the way to Carron. There, John Baird was visited around 11 p.m. by John King, who gave him the other half card. At around 5 a.m. on 5 April Hardie arrived with 25 men, soaked through. Baird had expected a small army, but King urged them on, saying he would go on ahead to rally supporters. One of the men named Kean went with him, and Baird and Hardie set off with a total of 30 men. On the way, they twice came across travellers, but let them go. The travellers passed the information on to authorities at Kilsyth and Stirling Castle. King arrived again, though Kean was not with him. and told them that he had instructions that he had to go quickly to find supporters at Camelon, while Baird and Hardie were to leave the road and wait at Bonnymuir.

Sixteen Hussars and sixteen Yeomanry troopers had been ordered on 4 April to leave Perth and go to protect Carron. They left the road at Bonnybridge early on 5 April and made straight for the slopes of Bonnymuir. As the newspapers subsequently reported, "On observing this force the radicals cheered and advanced to a wall over which they commenced firing at the military. Some shots were then fired by the soldiers in return, and after some time the cavalry got through an opening in the wall and attacked the party who resisted till overpowered by the troops who succeeded in taking nineteen of them prisoners, who are lodged in Stirling Castle. Four of the radicals were wounded". The Glasgow Herald sniggered at the small number of radicals encountered, but worried that "the conspiracy appears to be more extensive than almost anyone imagined... radical principles are too widely spread and too deeply rooted to vanish without some explosion and the sooner it takes place the better."

During 5 April, more regiments arrived in Glasgow, causing considerable excitement. Some signs of resistance being organised were reported and the army stood on the alert well into the night, but no radical attack materialised. In Duntocher, Paisley and Camelon people thought to be drilling or making pikes were arrested.

=== The march from Strathaven ===
On the afternoon of 5 April, before news of the Bonnymuir fighting got out, "the Englishman" Lees sent a message asking the radicals of Strathaven to meet up with the "Radical laird" Kinloch's large force at Cathkin, and next morning a small force of 25 men followed the instructions and left at 7 a.m. to march there. The experienced elderly Radical James Wilson is claimed to have had a banner reading "Scotland Free or a Desart" [sic]. At East Kilbride they were warned of an army ambush, and Wilson, suspecting treachery, returned to Strathaven. The others bypassed the ambush and reached Cathkin, but as there was no sign of the promised army they dispersed. Ten of them were identified and caught, and by nightfall on 7 April they were jailed at Hamilton.

Other Radical disturbances occurred at weaver villages around the central lowlands and west central Scotland, with less obvious activity in some east coast towns.

=== Prisoners to Greenock ===
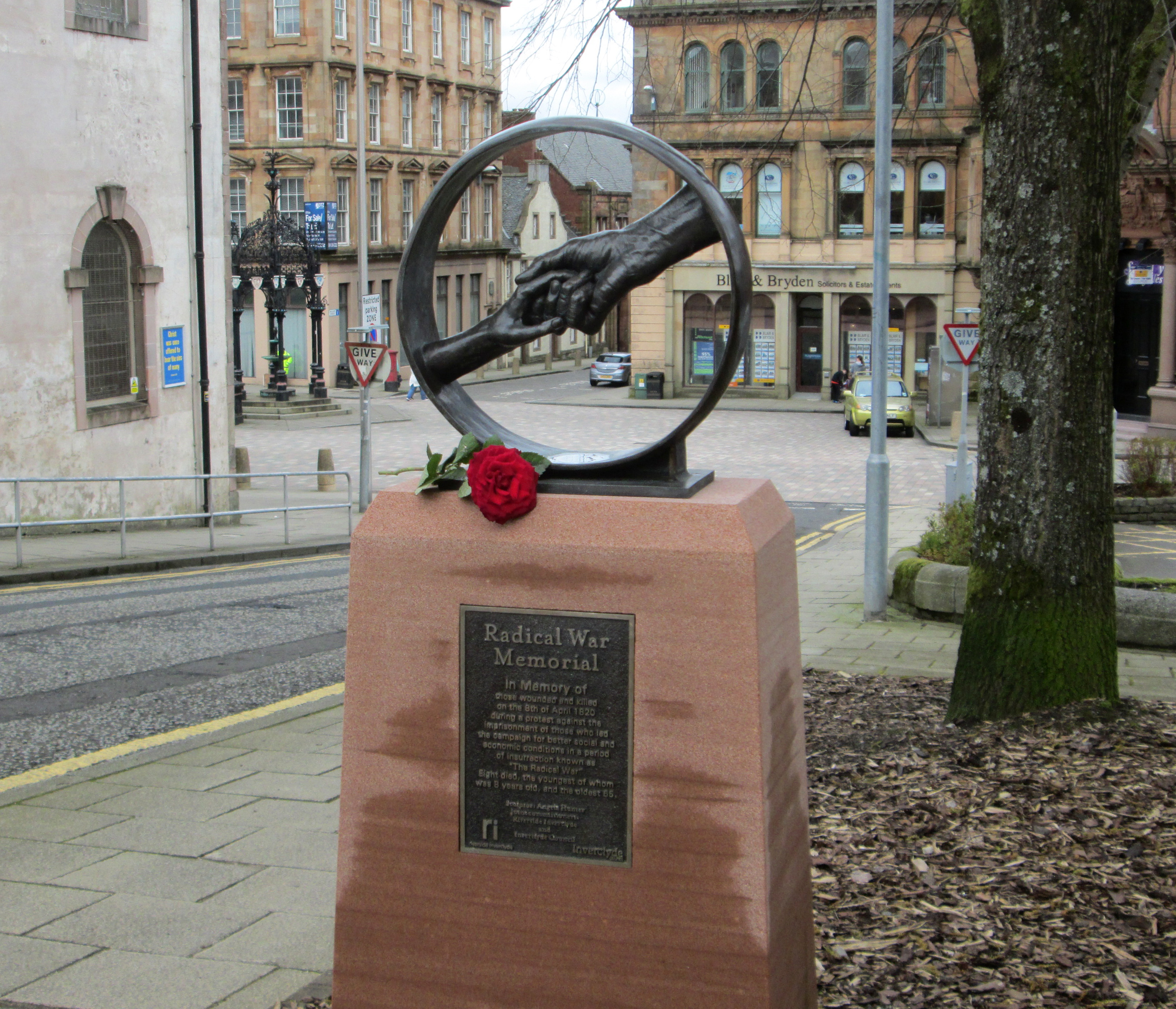
Radical War monument in Greenock, across the street from the Jail site. The Dutch Gable building of 1755 is seen past the clasped hands, the Mid Kirk of 1761 is to the left.

Large numbers of suspected ringleaders were imprisoned at various jails around the region. The Port Glasgow Volunteers served in Paisley during the strike, and when returning home on Saturday 8 April escorted five prisoners to be taken on to Greenock jail in a cart. On the way through Port Glasgow, their commanders responded to rumours by increasing the escort from 30 to 80 men, and they met with minor hostility while marching through the town of Crawfurdsdyke. They reached Greenock jail, and while handing over the prisoners had to shelter from stones thrown from higher ground to the south of the jail.

A hostile crowd gathered, and shots fired in the air failed to calm the situation. As the Volunteers returned along Cathcart Street, the "mob continued to increase, throwing stones, bottles, &c. from windows and closes." The Volunteers suffered bruising, and as they approached Rue-end Street opened sporadic fire, killing and wounding several of the crowd. The mob pursued the Volunteers into Crawfurdsdyke, then returned to break open the jail. A magistrate urged the crowd to desist, but with no forces to resist them, agreed to release the prisoners who then escaped. A large group set off to burn down Port Glasgow, but were halted at that town's boundary by armed townsfolk who had barricaded the Devol's Glen Bridge. Greenock magistrates arrived, and dispersed the crowd.

A List of Killed and Wounded was "collected from the several Medical Practitioners in Greenock, 11th April 1820", describing the wounds sustained and the condition of the survivors. It listed 18 casualties, including an 8 year old boy, and a 65 year old woman. At this time 6 were noted as dead, others died later from their wounds, and a report published on 15 July said there were "nine of the mob dead, and nine more dangerously wounded, there are two of the volunteers also wounded."

=== Flight to Canada ===
In April 1820, hundreds of young Radicals fled by ship to Canada from Greenock, escaping persecution from Lord Sidmouth's spy network. Among them was William Lyon Mackenzie who was a leader in the Canada Rebellions of 1837–1838.

== Trials and executions ==
In various towns a total of 88 men were charged with treason. At both Glasgow and Stirling a special Royal commission Court of Oyer and Terminer was set up to prosecute.

James Wilson was arrested and on 20 July was put on trial at Glasgow charged with four counts of treason. The jury found him Not Guilty on three counts, Guilty of "compassing to levy war against the King in order to compel him to change his measures" and recommended mercy, but he was sentenced to death.

Five of his colleagues were found Not Guilty, and another was discharged. On 1 August, a jury ignored the abrasive judge and refused to convict two weavers.

At Stirling Tolbooth on 4 August, the judge advised "To you Andrew Hardie and John Baird I can hold out little or no hope of mercy" since "as you were the leaders, I am afraid that example must be given by you."

James Wilson was hanged and beheaded on 30 August, watched by some 20,000 people, first remarking to the executioner "Did you ever see such a crowd, Thomas?".

On 8 September, Hardie and Baird were executed outside Stirling Tolbooth, watched by a crowd of 2,000. The Sheriff of Stirling, Ranald MacDonald, required that they make no political speech from the gallows, but agreed that they could speak upon the bible. Baird concluded his brief speech by saying "Although this day we die an ignominious death by unjust laws our blood, which in a very few minutes shall flow on this scaffold, will cry to heaven for vengeance, and may it be the means of our afflicted Countrymen’s speedy redemption." Hardie then spoke of "our blood [being] shed on this scaffold... for no other sin but seeking the legitimate rights of our ill used and down trodden beloved Countrymen", then when the Sheriff angrily intervened he concluded by asking those present to "go quietly home and read your Bibles, and remember the fate of Hardie and Baird." They were hanged and then beheaded, in what was the last beheading in the UK, a few months after the Cato Street Plot.

Thomas McCulloch, John Barr, William Smith, Benjamin Moir, Allan Murchie, Alexander Latimer, Andrew White, David Thomson, James Wright, William Clackson / William Clarkson, Thomas Pike/Thomas Pink, Robert Gray, James Clelland, Alexander Hart, Thomas McFarlane, John Anderson, Andrew Dawson, John McMillan and the 15-year-old Alexander Johnstone were in due course transported to the penal colonies in New South Wales or Tasmania. Peter Mackenzie, a Glasgow journalist, campaigned unsuccessfully to have them pardoned, and published a small book: The Spy System, including the exploits of Mr Alex. Richmond, the notorious Government Spy of Sidmouth and Castlereagh.

Eventually, on 10 August 1835, an absolute pardon was granted.

== Outcome ==
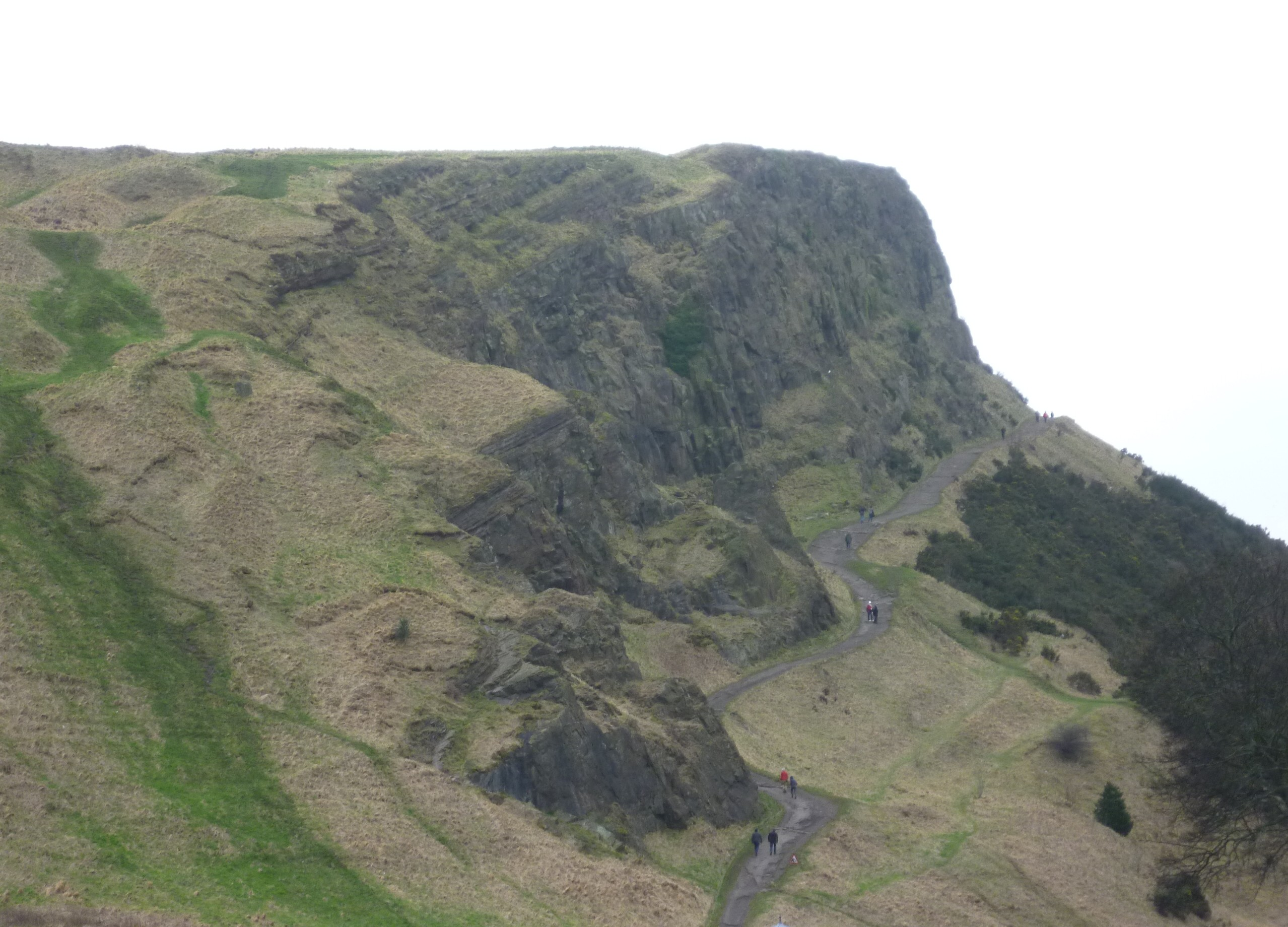
The Radical Road, Salisbury Crags

The effect of the crushing of this staged insurrection was to effectively discourage serious Radical unrest in Scotland for some time. Lord Melville, the right hand man in Scotland of Lord Liverpool's government, saw the suggested Visit of King George IV to Scotland as a political need, to engage the feelings of the common people and weaken the Radical movement. The event, largely organised by Sir Walter Scott, succeeded brilliantly and brought a new-found Scottish national identity creating widespread enthusiasm for the tartan "plaided pageantry" that Sheriff Ranald MacDonald of Stirling was already enthusiastically engaged in as a Clan chieftain at Ulva and member of various "Highland societies".

At the suggestion of Walter Scott, unemployed weavers from the west of Scotland were put to work on paving a track round Salisbury Crags in Holyrood Park adjoining Arthur's Seat. The path is still known as the Radical Road.

The cause of electoral reform continued, and with the Scottish Reform Act 1832 Glasgow was given its own Member of Parliament for the first time. The event was largely overshadowed by English Radical events and forgotten by school history, but in the 20th century the Scottish National Party historian J. Halliday brought the event back into the curriculum. At an anniversary debate in the Scottish Parliament members of the various parties each found lessons for their different causes in the "Radical War".

A large memorial stone to mark the 200th anniversary of the Battle of Bonnymuir was unveiled in 2021.

== In literature and drama ==
James Kelman's play, Hardie and Baird: The Last Days, was produced at the Traverse Theatre, Edinburgh, under the direction of Ian Brown, between 30 June and 22 July 1990.

== See also ==
- Radicalism (historical)
- 1820 United Kingdom general election
