= Society of the Friends of the People =

Former parliamentary reform society in Great Britain

The Society of the Friends of the People was an organisation in Great Britain that was focused on advocating for parliamentary reform. It was founded by the Whig Party in 1792.

The Society in England was aristocratic and exclusive, in contrast to the Friends of the People in Scotland, who increasingly drew on a wider membership. Members wanted parliamentary representatives to reflect the population of Great Britain, which could be achieved by making voting more accessible, by granting more men the right to vote, and by making it possible for a broader variety of men to take part in the government.

The Society disbanded in the mid 1790s as a result of conservative reaction against radical political movements.

== Background ==
=== Country-party Ideology ===
During the 18th century, civic humanism became an important political consideration in England. Civic humanism stresses the importance of abandoning personal gain for the common good. It called for a political balance in order to prevent corruption. In England, civic humanism gave rise to the Country Party, which advocated for a less corrupt government that would work for the good of the people and not for the attainment of wealth. The idea of country-party ideology and civic humanism led to the formation of many reformist movements called for parliamentary reform in order to more accurately reflect the will of the people.

=== Influence of the French Revolution ===
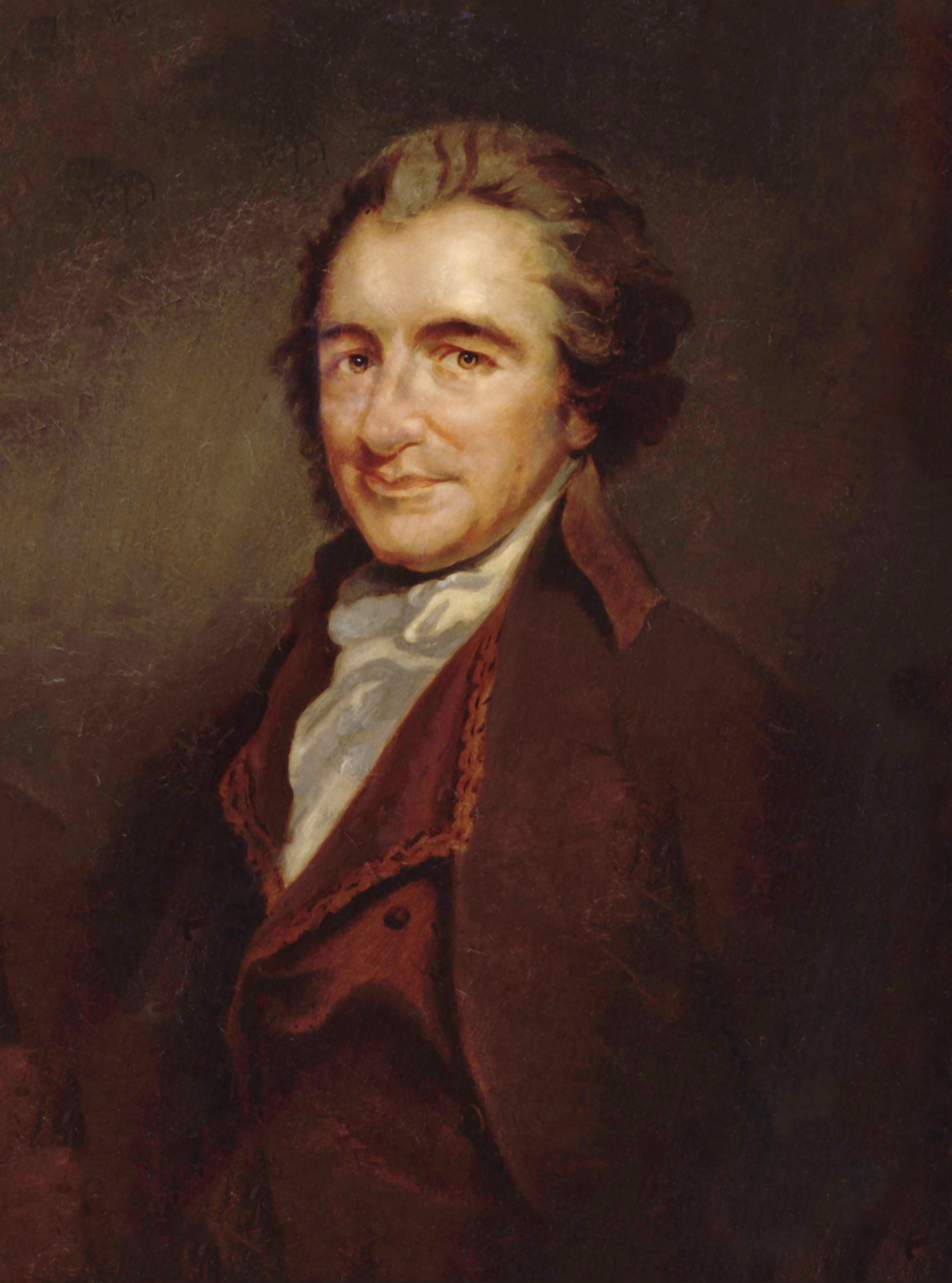
Thomas Paine

The end of the 18th century brought political change throughout Europe. Although the French Revolution brought about extreme unrest in France, similar ideas were being discussed in Great Britain. The British radicals believed in the idea of the universal rights of man (life, liberty, and property) and democracy. Conservatives wanted to maintain the monarchy and Parliament the way they were. In 1791, Thomas Paine published Rights of Man, which stated that the French Revolution was bringing good change to the political system of France. He also declared that the people of Great Britain should rebel to establish democracy and universal rights for all men in Britain. This paper fueled the radical ideology in Great Britain at the time. It also increased the tension between radicals and conservatives, leading to political uncertainty in Britain.

=== Corruption in Parliament ===
In 1780, about 3% of the population of England had the right to elect members of Parliament's House of Commons. Some of the largest cities were completely unrepresented and more than half of the rotten boroughs were so small as to attract widespread vote buying.

== Friends of the People in England ==
On 11 April 1792, a group of reformist Whigs started the Society of the Friends of the People, a group dedicated to parliamentary reform. To gain membership, a prospective member must be proposed by two current members and approved by 90% of the members. Members paid dues of two and a half guineas per year, unless they joined with the intent to start a similar organisation elsewhere, in which case they paid only one. The group met on the first Friday of each month. Notable members and supporters include Reverend Christopher Wyvill, Sir Philip Francis, and George Tierney.

=== Beliefs and publications ===
The Society wanted to extend the right of freedom of election to a larger group of men. They also wanted more equal representation in the House of Commons, and they wanted to shorten the maximum interval allowed by law between any two successive elections of members of the House of Commons In 1794, Sir Philip Francis stated in a meeting that the society should support extending the right to vote in elections of the House of Commons to any male adult who was not a convicted criminal or "lunatic".

==== "Address to the People of Great Britain" ====
"The Address to the People of Great Britain" was written in 1792 by Reverend Christopher Wyvill. The Society feared being potentially linked to radical political movements like those in France or to radical English groups like the London Corresponding Society and the Society for Constitutional Information. As a result, this address denied any association with the political reforms happening in France. They felt that the French reformists were trying to create a new type of government, while the Society was trying to make the current English government the way it was supposed to be. They also stated that their methods were reasonable and moderate in comparison. While the French had found hope in the government and resorted to violence as a means of bringing change, the Society was focused more on moderate reform through intellectual communication.

==== "State of the Representation of England and Wales" ====
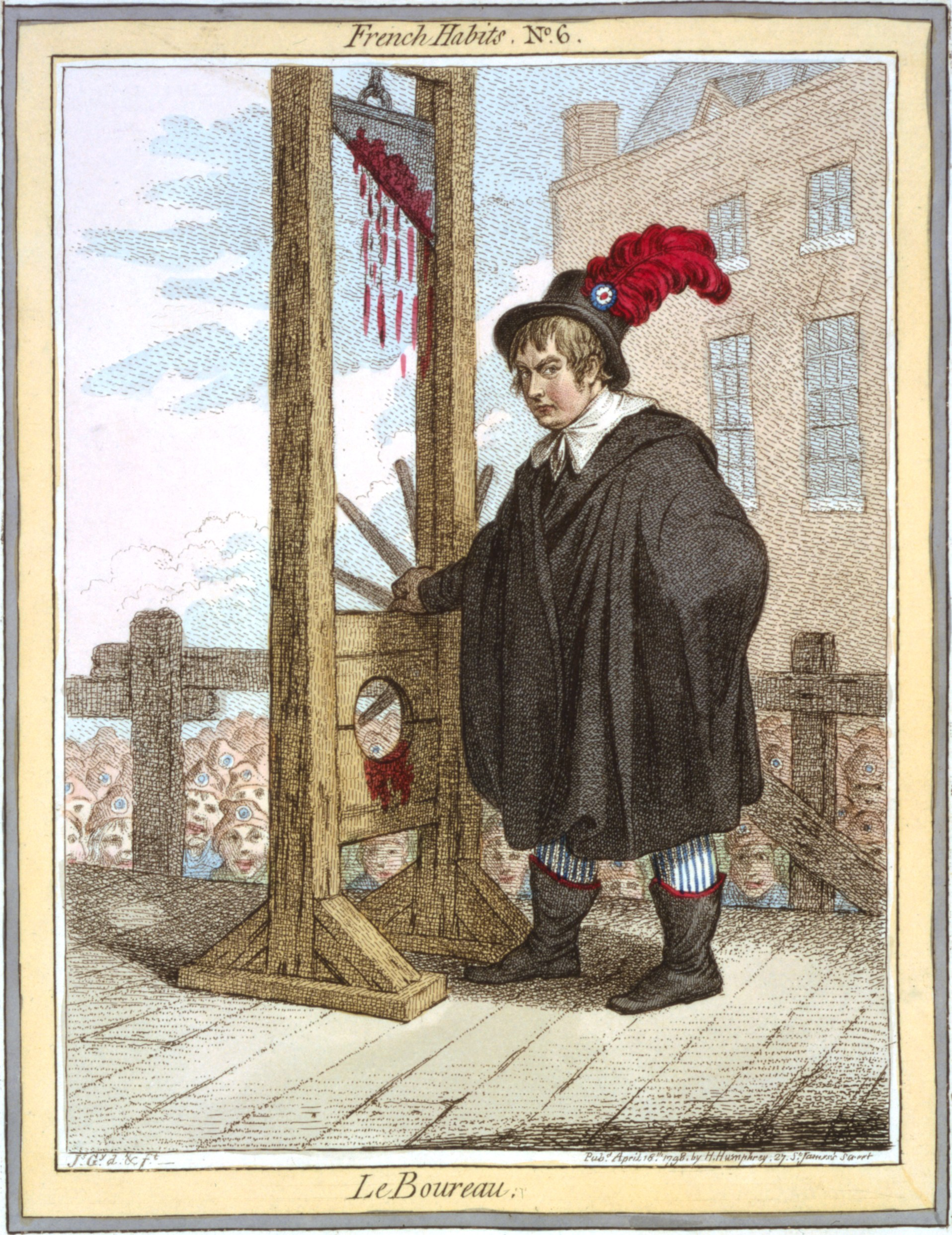
Cartoon shows George Tierney dressed as an executioner standing next to a guillotine with a crowd of liberty-capped citizens in the background.

"The State of the Representation of England and Wales" was delivered to the Society on 9 February 1793. This pointed out the unfair manner in which Parliament representatives were chosen and conducted business, and it called for change of these issues. They found that members of parliament were chosen by a minuscule portion of the population, meaning they were not truly representatives for the entire people of England. The number of members were also not assigned to counties in a way that represented the population of England. They found that the right to vote was also limited to a small population, property owning men of a certain income who met religious and other requirements. The Society felt some restrictions should be lifted, allowing the voting population to be more reflective of the actual population. Similarly, they thought that the elections were held in a manner that inconvenienced many people, making it hard for some to vote. Voters often had to travel a great distance to be able to vote, which further dwindles the number of people voting. Also, although candidates theoretically only needed 300 pounds a year to qualify, the operation was set up in such a way to prevent anyone who did not own thousands of pounds from being a candidate. They also found that although Parliament was supposed to last no longer than three years, Parliament itself decided that in 1715, they could hold their seats for seven. The society felt that this duration should return to three, as laid down by law. The Society wanted all of these grievances to spark reform in the way Parliament was elected and operated. The report was given by George Tierney, and would later be used by groups looking for evidence proving the corruption of Parliament.

=== Whig Party influence ===
The membership included 3 Whig Peers and 28 Whig Members of Parliaments, one being Richard Brinsley Sheridan. Charles James Fox was not a member, and it is argued that the society excluded him to separate themselves from the Whig party, with their only goal being the elimination of corrupt election practices. Fox stated that he did not wish to discourage the enthusiasts pressing for "more equal representation of the people in Parliament" and voted for Grey's motion in Parliament which was defeated by 284 votes to 41 in May 1793.

The Friends of the People caused divisions inside the Whigs. On 4 June 1792 John Cartwright (a Friends of the People member) made a speech praising Thomas Paine's book, The Rights of Man. Four Whig MPs resigned from the Whig group in parliament.

=== Disbandment of the society ===
==== William Pitt's reign of terror ====
The Revolution in France sparked fear in the leaders of other European countries. They saw reformists and radicals as having the potential to completely overturn the government and destroy the nation. As a result, William Pitt, the British Prime Minister at the time, wanted to destroy reform in England to avoid an uprising like the French revolution. Instead of using violence to combat reform, he used legislation. He suspended the Habeas Corpus Suspension Act 1794. He passed the Seditious Meetings Act 1795 and the Treason Act 1795; combined, these prevented any meetings that were "seditious and unlawful" and required that a magistrate be notified if a meeting were to occur that included 50 or more people. The Newspaper Publication Act 1798 required that all printing presses be registered in order to prevent the publication of material that criticised the government.

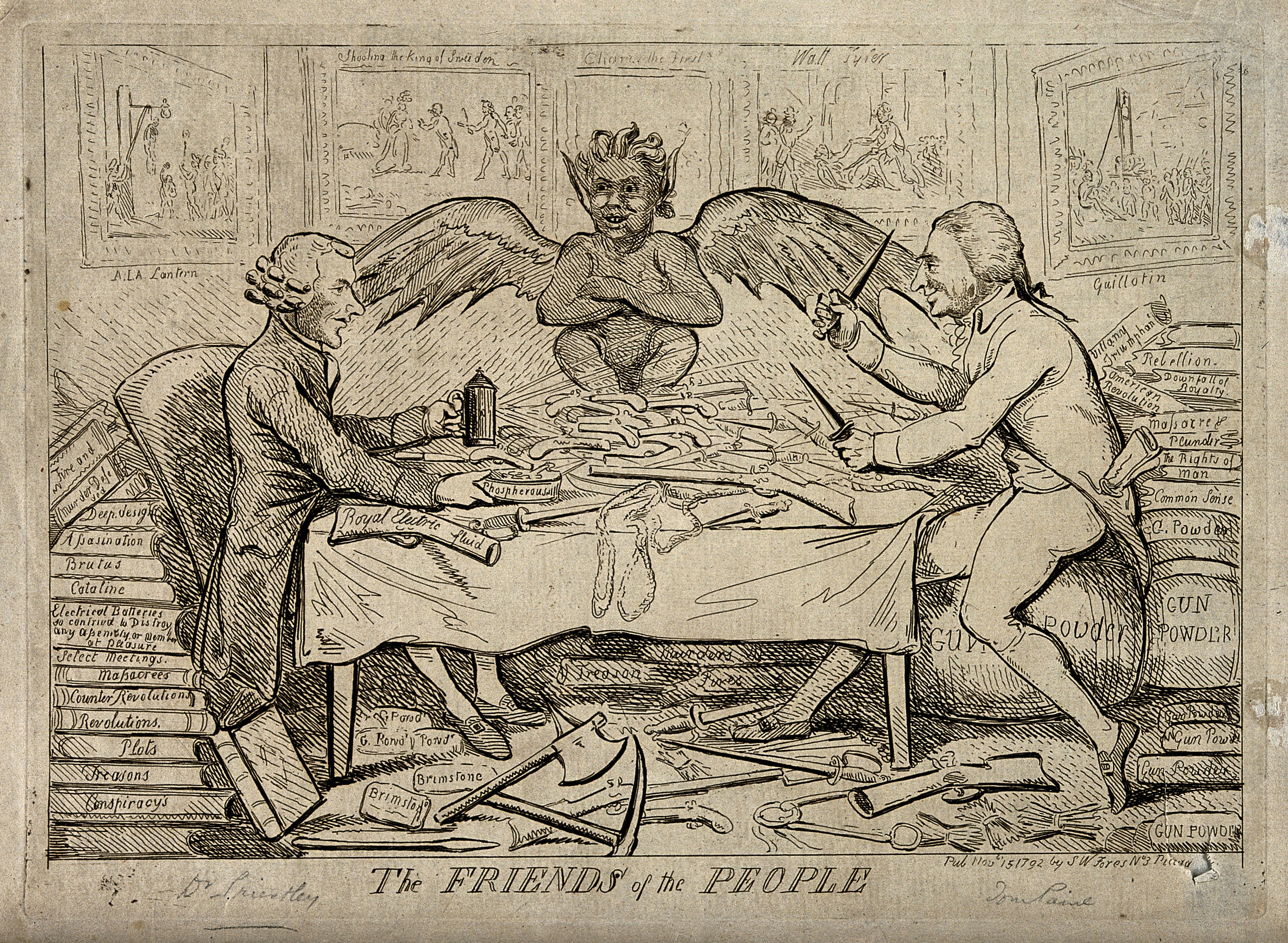
Caricature of Republican Solidarity, by Isaac Cruikshank 1792

==== Spy infiltration ====
The Report on Radical and Reform Societies from 1794 was a document stating that the London Corresponding Society and the Society for Constitutional Information were guilty of threatening the constitution of Great Britain through activities and publications that were consistent with radical reformist ideologies. This was discovered because of the infiltration of conservative spies in the societies, which led to the arrests of the leaders.

During this time, the British Government feared the threat of spies in the country. And so, the government created the Aliens Act 1793, which regulated the number of immigrants who could move into Britain.

==== Disbandment ====
Although the Society was still advocating for parliamentary reform in 1794 after the arrests of leaders of similar societies, they disbanded some time after that as a result of the 1795 Acts.

=== Criticism ===
Compared to radical groups of the time, the Society was quite moderate. In fact, they were so scared to be associated with the radical movements of the time that they rarely said anything specific at all. Instead of calling for drastic reform, they focused on listing grievances. As a result, their intentions seemed ambiguous. Francis himself stated that the Society delayed in making it clear what its intentions and feelings were about reform.

=== Reform Act 1832 ===
Forty years after the Society of the Friends of the People was formed, the Reform Act 1832 helped establish the parliamentary reform that the Society had called for. It removed representation from 56 rotten boroughs and lowered representation in areas with lower population from two to one. It also created 67 new boroughs so areas with larger populations had representation in Parliament. It also allowed a wider range of men to vote by loosening the property and tax qualifications to the right to vote.

== Friends of the People in Scotland ==
In Scotland The Friends of the People Society in Edinburgh was founded in July 1792 with lower subscription rates than the English Society, attracting a wider membership which made it more like the London Corresponding Society. It soon had imitators in towns and villages throughout Scotland.

The rank and file were usually described as "shopkeepers and artisans", and included most prominently weavers as well as tailors, cobblers, brewers, bakers, tanners, butchers and hairdressers. The membership generally did not include general labourers, agricultural workers, colliers, spinners, foundrymen, masons and the like. The government feared such wider support and outbreaks of rioting in many places in the summer and autumn of 1792 were officially attributed to "an almost universal spirit of reform and opposition to the established government and legal administrators which has wonderfully diffused through the manufacturing towns", but most of the riots were due to other grievances such as an unpopular turnpike, the Corn laws and the Enclosures. Radical demonstrations were evident, not just in the larger towns such as Perth and Dundee but also in smaller towns such as Auchtermuchty, at each of which a "Tree of Liberty" was erected and there were cries of "Liberty and Equality", but the Friends of the People unhesitatingly condemned these disturbances and threatened to expel from their membership anyone joining the rioters.

Between December 1792 and October 1793 held three "general conventions" of the Societies, the last being open to English delegates. Each convention and its aftermath increasingly frightened the upper middle classes away from the reform movement.

The first convention in December 1792 was well patronised by some of the Edinburgh Advocates, by Lord Daer and by Lieutenant Colonel Dalrymple of Fordell, and given literary backing by the Member of Parliament for Inverness, Colonel Macleod. The effective leader at the radical faction at this convention was the eloquent Glasgow lawyer Thomas Muir who was subsequently sentenced by Lord Braxfield to fourteen years' transportation to the convict settlement at Botany Bay, Australia. In the second convention a similar rôle was played by the Unitarian minister Thomas Fyshe Palmer from Dundee who suffered a similar fate. The third convention was totally deserted by the lawyers, attended by Lord Daer for a few days only, and publicly renounced by Colonel Macleod.

The third "general convention" in October 1793 was held in Edinburgh and called a British Convention, with delegates from some of the English corresponding societies attending. The leaders of the convention were Joseph Gerrald and Maurice Margarot, representatives from the London Corresponding Society. The convention issued a manifesto demanding universal male suffrage with annual elections and expressing their support for the principles of the French Revolution. The convention was then broken up by the authorities and a number of men were arrested and tried for sedition, with Gerrald and Margarot being sentenced to fourteen years' transportation along with Muir.

== See also ==
- Radicalism (historical)
