= John Baird (revolutionary) =

Scottish revolutionary, born 1790

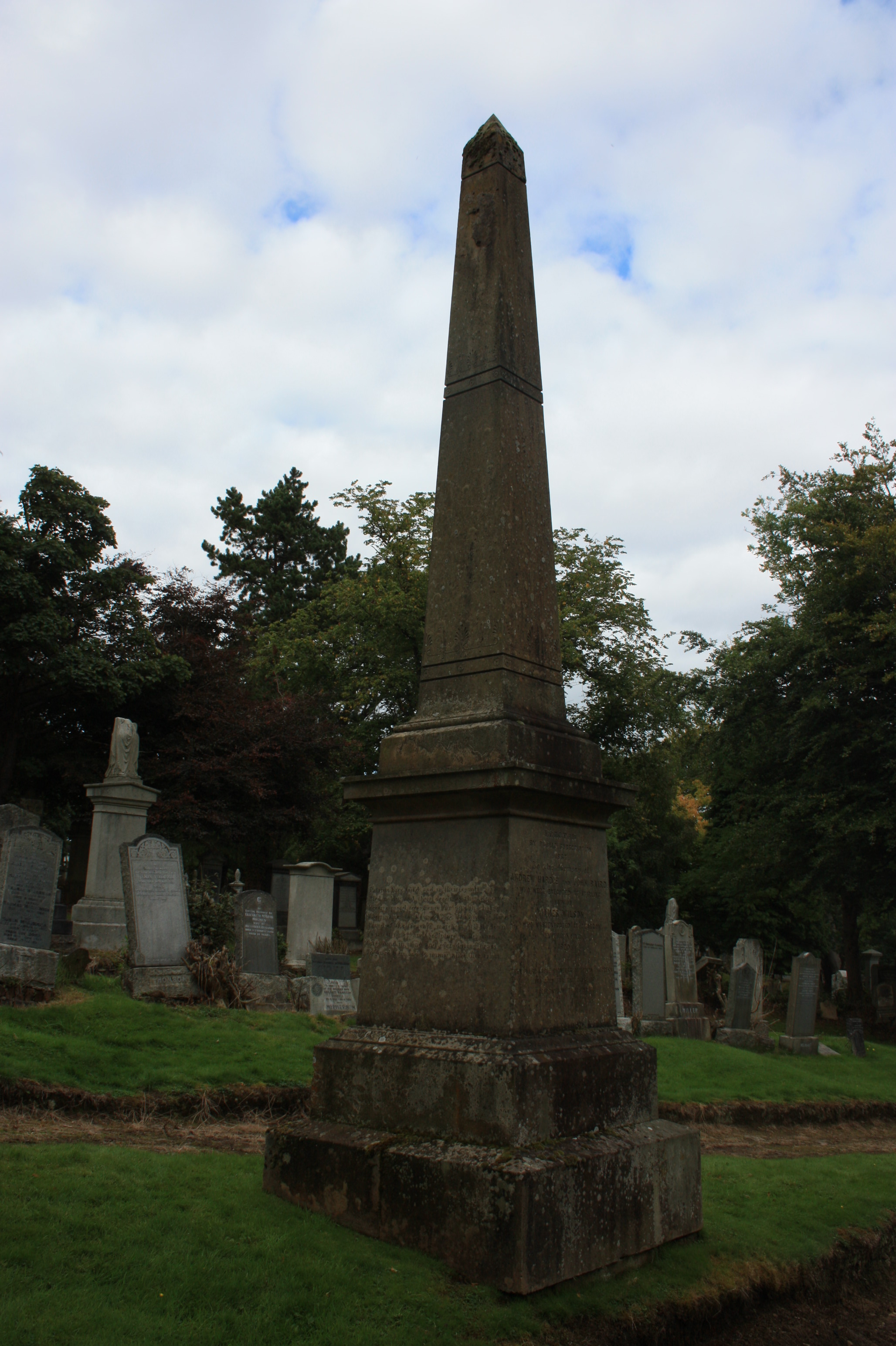
The memorial to Andrew Hardie and John Baird, Woodside Cemetery, Paisley

John Baird (born 1 September 1790, died in Stirling, 8 September 1820) was a Scottish revolutionary. A weaver by trade, he was brought up in the village of Condorrat. He is best remembered as a commander in the "Radical War" of 1820, and along with James Wilson and Andrew Hardie is one of the best remembered combatants of the "Radical War".

Baird had a military career in the British Army, serving in the 2nd Battalion of the 95th Regiment of Foot (known as the Rifle Brigade) seeing military action in both Argentina and Spain. His military experience meant that he was suitable to become commander of the Radicals in their doomed march to the Carron Ironworks.

He was sentenced to death and was executed outside Stirling Tolbooth on 8 September 1820 along with Hardie. He is remembered as a martyr to the fight for universal suffrage by many figures in Scotland, particularly the 1820 Society.
