= Andrew Hardie (radical) =

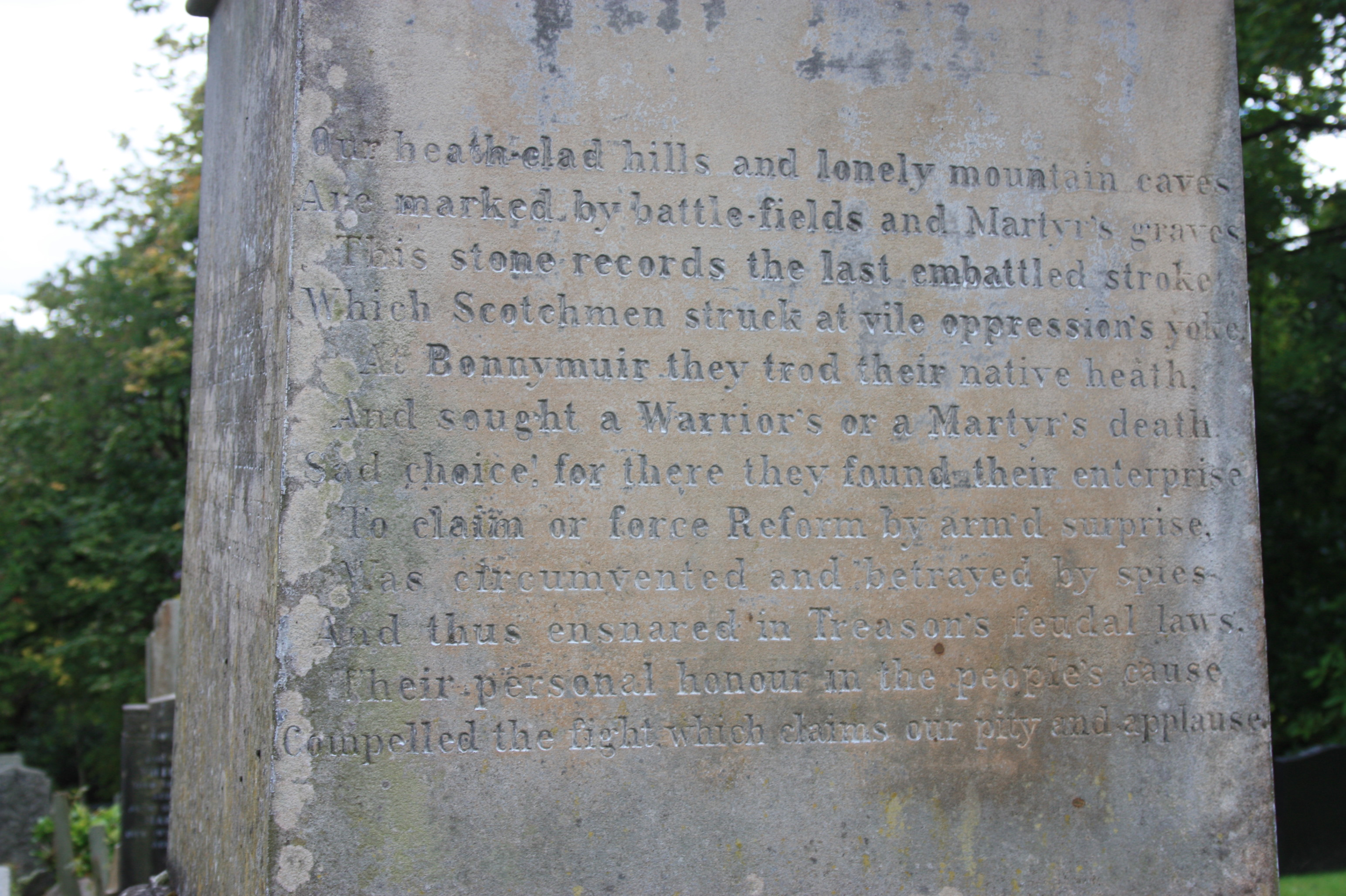
The Bonnymuir inscription, memorial to the martyrs Andrew Hardie and John Baird, Woodside Cemetery, Paisley

Andrew Hardie was second-in-command of the Radical Forces who marched on Scotland's Carron Ironworks at Bonnymuir near Falkirk in the "Radical War" of 1820.

He was sentenced to death and was executed outside Stirling Tolbooth on 8 September 1820, along with John Baird. In his speech on the scaffold he declared himself "a martyr to the cause of truth and justice".
