= Municipal Buildings, Stirling =

Municipal building in Stirling, Scotland

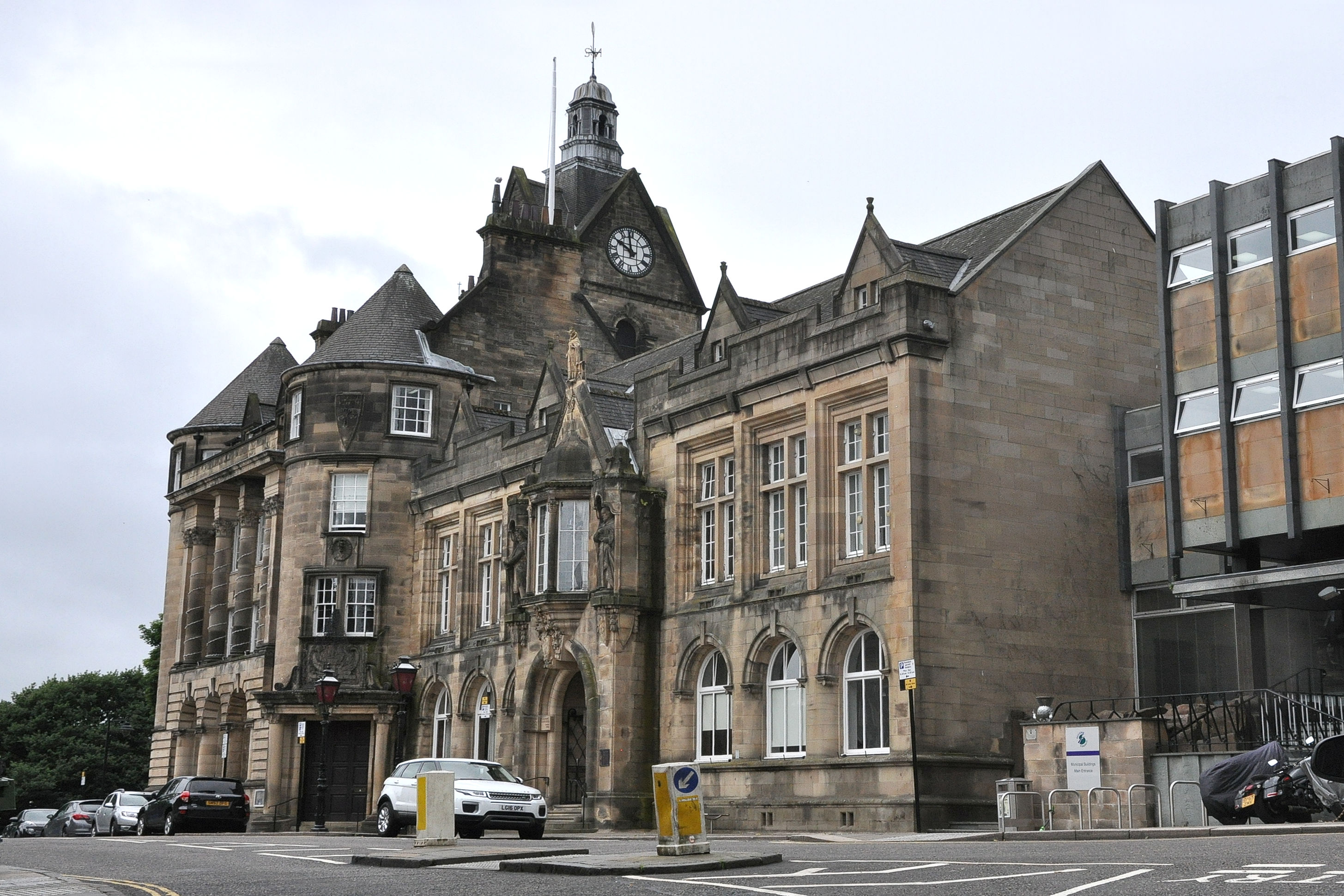
- Municipal Buildings, Stirling

- Shown in Stirling
- 56.1183°N 3.9395°W
- Location: Corn Exchange Road, Stirling

History
- Built: 1918

Site notes
- Architect: John Gaff Gillespie
- Architectural style: Scottish baronial style

Listed Building – Category B
- Official name: Municipal Buildings, 8-10 Corn Exchange Road, Stirling
- Designated: 4 November 1965
- Reference no.: LB41105

The Municipal Buildings are based in Corn Exchange Road, Stirling, Scotland. The structure, which was the meeting place of Stirling Burgh Council, is a Category B listed building.

== History ==
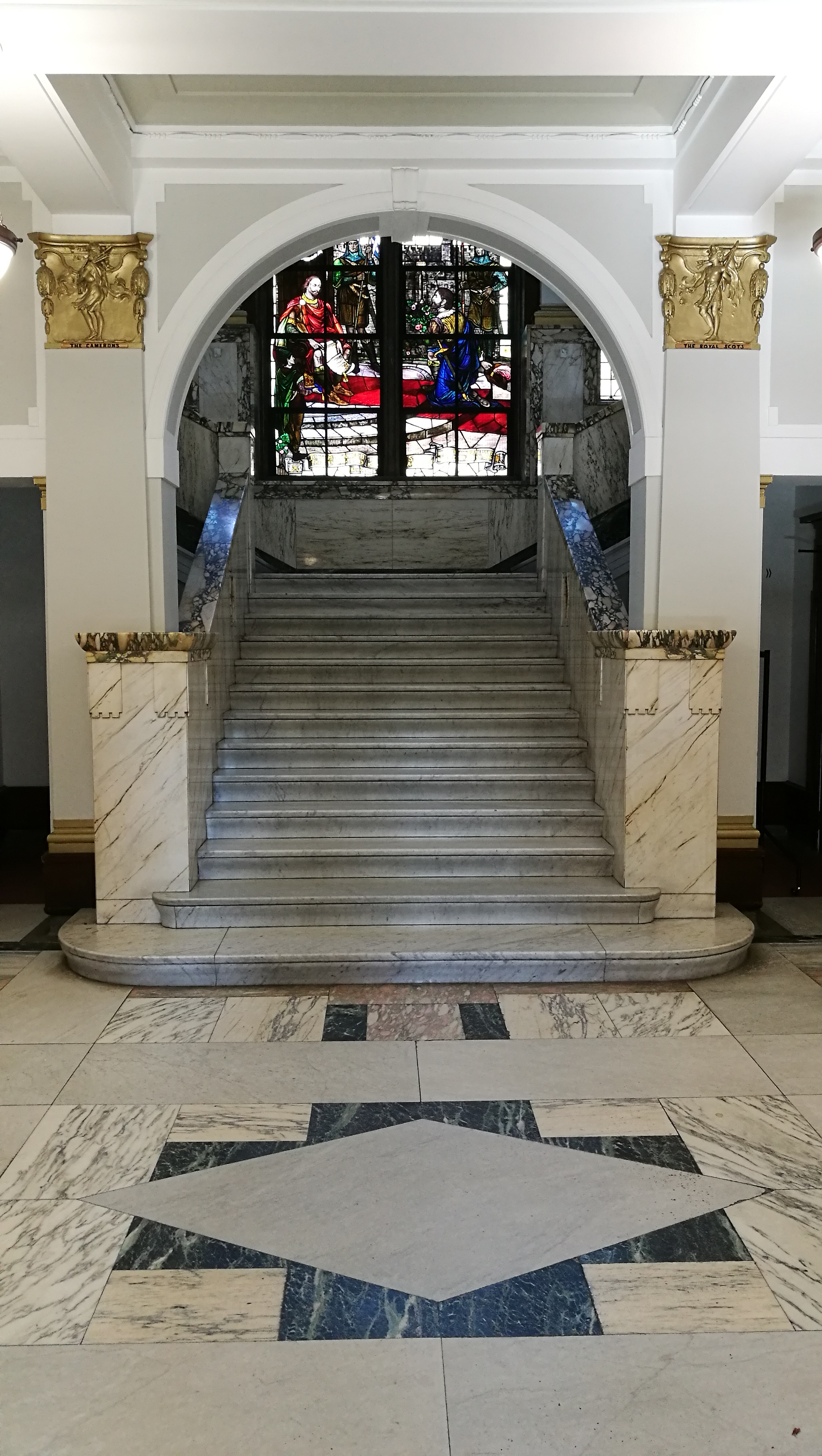
Main entrance staircase and stained glass window

The first municipal building in the city was the Stirling Tolbooth in Broad Street which was completed in 1705. Burgh leaders then relocated to The Athenaeum in King Street in 1875.

In the late 19th century, civic leaders decided to erect a more substantial municipal complex to address the growing needs of the city: the site they selected was occupied by a long narrow building, the old corn exchange. The old corn exchange had been the venue for the weekly grain markets in the 19th century but had also been used for public meetings and theatre performances. A statue of the former Prime Minister and local member of parliament, Sir Henry Campbell-Bannerman, designed by Paul Raphael Montford was unveiled to the southwest of the proposed complex by the then Prime Minister, H. H. Asquith, in November 1913.

The foundation stone for the new complex was laid by King George V on 11 July 1914. It was designed by John Gaff Gillespie in the Scottish baronial style, built in ashlar stone at a cost of £21,000 and was officially opened in March 1918. The proposed design involved a symmetrical main frontage with thirteen bays facing onto Corn Exchange Road; there was intended to be a left section, a central section and a right section but the right section was never built. The central section of seven bays, which was slightly recessed, featured an arched doorway on the ground floor, a prominent oriel window on the first floor and a gable above. Statues of Robert the Bruce and William Wallace were installed on the left and right of the oriel window respectively, and a statue of Mary, Queen of Scots was installed at the apex of the gable. There were round headed windows in the other bays on the ground floor and mullioned windows on the first floor. The left section of three bays involved round headed windows on the ground floor and recessed sash windows on the first and second floors flanked by giant Corinthian order columns supporting a cornice. On the south western elevation there was a five-stage tower with a sash window on the ground floor, a two-storey oriel window on the next two floors and a two-storey recess above; the top section of the tower featured Venetian windows on the sides and clock faces in the gables.

Internally, the principal rooms were the council chamber and committee rooms on the first floor; the main staircase, which was made from marble, was illuminated with a stained glass window, designed by the architect and installed by William Meikle & Sons, depicting King Alexander II presenting a charter to burgh officials in 1226.

The Duke and Duchess of York visited the municipal buildings to receive the freedom of the city on 10 August 1928. A modern extension, designed by Walter H. Gillespie, was erected on the vacant site where the original right hand section should have been built, in 1968. The complex continued to serve as the headquarters of the burgh council for much of the 20th century, and remained the meeting place of the enlarged Stirling District Council after it was formed in 1975. However, it ceased to be the local seat of government when the new unitary authority, Stirling Council, was formed at Old Viewforth in 1996. The council carried out a programme of refurbishment works to convert it into a digital technology hub in 2017.

Works of art in the municipal buildings include a portrait by Francis Henry Newbery of the guardian of the fens known as the "Fen Reeve", a portrait by Thomas Stuart Smith of a man smoking a Cuban cigarette and a landscape by Duncan Cameron depicting Stirling Castle.

== See also ==
- List of listed buildings in Stirling, Stirling
