= List of listed buildings in Stirling, Stirling =

This is a list of listed buildings in the burgh of Stirling, Scotland.

== List ==
Name	Location	Date listed	Geo-coordinates	Notes	Category	LB number	Image
52 And 54 Baker Street			56°07′11″N 3°56′24″W		C(S)	45368	Upload Photo
60 Baker Street			56°07′11″N 3°56′25″W		C(S)	45370	Upload Photo
Snowdon Place 9 Department Of The Environment			56°06′40″N 3°56′27″W		C(S)	41474	Upload Photo
Torbrex 4 Torbrex Village			56°06′20″N 3°56′54″W		C(S)	41486	Upload Photo
9 Upper Bridge Street, Bellfield House Including Boundary Walls And Garden Steps			56°07′25″N 3°56′35″W		B	41489	Upload Photo
Upper Bridge Street 30 (E Side)			56°07′25″N 3°56′29″W		C(S)	41494	Upload Photo
Victoria Place 22, 23			56°06′56″N 3°56′46″W		C(S)	41511	Upload Photo
Victoria Place 37, 38			56°06′50″N 3°56′42″W		C(S)	41515	Upload Photo
Victoria Square 5, 7			56°07′00″N 3°56′44″W		C(S)	41517	Upload Photo
Victoria Square 17, 19			56°07′03″N 3°56′49″W		C(S)	41521	Upload Photo
Park Place Rockdale Lodge			56°06′41″N 3°57′14″W		B	41387	Upload Photo
Park Place 8 Ashfield House			56°06′43″N 3°57′07″W		C(S)	41393	Upload Photo
Park Terrace, 25, 26 And 2 Drummond Place			56°06′46″N 3°56′43″W		B	41403	Upload Photo
Park Terrace, 29, 30, 31			56°06′46″N 3°56′46″W		B	41405	Upload Photo
Pitt Terrace, 12, 13			56°06′51″N 3°56′16″W		B	41415	Upload Photo
Port Street 83-91			56°06′57″N 3°56′13″W		C(S)	41422	Upload Photo
Princes Street 14, 16			56°07′15″N 3°56′21″W		C(S)	41433	Upload Photo
Queen Street 19 (S. Side)			56°07′21″N 3°56′24″W		B	41437	Upload Photo
Queen Street 2, 4 (N. Side) And 1, 3, 5 Cowane Street Royal Hotel			56°07′21″N 3°56′21″W		B	41441	Upload Photo
Queen Street 6, 8 (N. Side)			56°07′21″N 3°56′21″W		B	41442	Upload Photo
Queen Street 38, 40 (N. Side)			56°07′23″N 3°56′26″W		B	41450	Upload Photo
Queens Road 2			56°07′05″N 3°56′53″W		C(S)	41453	Upload Photo
35 And 37 St John Street			56°07′14″N 3°56′37″W		C(S)	41463	Upload Photo
St Ninians Road Annfield (At Rear Of Stirling Albion F C Ground)			56°06′41″N 3°56′09″W		B	41470	Upload Photo
Snowdon Place 3, 5			56°06′42″N 3°56′22″W		B	41472	Upload Photo
Forth Place 9, 11			56°07′18″N 3°56′08″W		B	41288	Upload Photo
Forth Place 13, 15			56°07′19″N 3°56′07″W		B	41289	Upload Photo
Friars Street 33			56°07′10″N 3°56′17″W		B	41294	Upload Photo
Gladstone Place 13, 15			56°06′44″N 3°56′27″W		C(S)	41299	Upload Photo
Glebe Avenue 18, 19			56°06′58″N 3°56′27″W		C(S)	41306	Upload Photo
Glebe Crescent 7 Syha Offices			56°06′55″N 3°56′27″W		C(S)	41310	Upload Photo
Glebe Crescent 2 And 1 Windsor Place			56°06′57″N 3°56′30″W		C(S)	41311	Upload Photo
Glebe Crescent 4, 6			56°06′57″N 3°56′30″W		C(S)	41312	Upload Photo
Glebe Crescent 12, 14			56°06′55″N 3°56′30″W		C(S)	41314	Upload Photo
Hillfoots Road 12-18			56°08′24″N 3°55′21″W		B	41316	Upload Photo
Irvine Place 2			56°07′18″N 3°56′23″W		B	41319	Upload Photo
King Street 13, 15			56°07′04″N 3°56′14″W		B	41326	Upload Photo
King Street 17, 19			56°07′04″N 3°56′15″W		B	41327	Upload Photo
King Street 43, 45			56°07′04″N 3°56′17″W		B	41332	Upload Photo
King Street 53, 55, 57, 59			56°07′05″N 3°56′18″W		C(S)	41334	Upload Photo
King Street 40			56°07′06″N 3°56′17″W		B	41341	Upload Photo
Lower Bridge Street 43-47			56°07′35″N 3°56′30″W		C(S)	41347	Upload Photo
Melville Terrace 6			56°06′50″N 3°56′20″W		B	41353	Upload Photo
Melville Terrace 8, 9			56°06′48″N 3°56′21″W		B	41355	Upload Photo
Murray Place 1 And 2 King Street British Linen Bank			56°07′04″N 3°56′13″W		B	41363	Upload Photo
Murray Place 9, 11			56°07′05″N 3°56′12″W		B	41365	Upload Photo
Murray Place, 77, 79			56°07′10″N 3°56′15″W		B	41366	Upload Photo
North Street, 1 Maple Cottage Cambuskenneth			56°07′30″N 3°55′20″W		C(S)	41369	Upload Photo
North Street, 3 Ferry Orchard House Cambuskenneth			56°07′31″N 3°55′19″W		C(S)	41370	Upload Photo
Park Avenue 3, 4			56°06′54″N 3°56′23″W		C(S)	41377	Upload Photo
Park Place 11, 13			56°06′41″N 3°57′06″W		B	41384	Upload Photo
Stirling Arcade 1-43, 2-50 And 32, 34 King Street Including The Former Douglas Hotel Fronting Murray Place, Former Alhambra Theatre			56°07′06″N 3°56′16″W		B	41204	Upload another image
4 And 6 Baker Street			56°07′08″N 3°56′19″W		C(S)	41214	Upload Photo
24 And 26 Baker Street			56°07′09″N 3°56′21″W		C(S)	41219	Upload Photo
Barnton Street 1, 3, 7 And 35 Friars Street			56°07′11″N 3°56′17″W		B	41229	Upload Photo
26 Berkeley Street (Also Fronts Weaver Row And Williamfield Avenue), Williamfield			56°06′13″N 3°56′31″W		C(S)	41236	Upload Photo
Clarendon Place 9, 11			56°07′00″N 3°56′38″W		B	41260	Upload Photo
Clifford Road 12, 13			56°06′33″N 3°56′20″W		C(S)	41271	Upload Photo
Clifford Road Gatepiers			56°06′33″N 3°56′22″W		C(S)	41272	Upload Photo
Cowane Street 13-23			56°07′22″N 3°56′21″W		C(S)	41273	Upload Photo
Town Wall Port Street Bastion			56°07′01″N 3°56′09″W		C(S)	41114	Upload Photo
Monument to Robert Burns, Dumbarton Road			56°07′04″N 3°56′26″W		B	41121	Upload another image
Cowane Centre (Central Single Storey Section Only) Formerly Territorial Primary School, Cowane St			56°07′29″N 3°56′27″W		C(S)	41132	Upload Photo
Stirling Castle Great Hall (1503)			56°07′27″N 3°56′52″W		A	41139	Upload another image
Stirling Castle Kings Park Wall			56°06′57″N 3°57′22″W		B	41147	Upload Photo
Westerlands (Formerly Wester Livilands) Clifford Road			56°06′32″N 3°56′04″W		B	41150	Upload Photo
Kerse Road, Former Kerse Corn Mill			56°06′48″N 3°55′37″W		B	41153	Upload Photo
Abercromby Place 7, 9			56°07′00″N 3°56′31″W		C(S)	41156	Upload Photo
Abercromby Place 13			56°07′00″N 3°56′34″W		C(S)	41158	Upload Photo
Allan Park 17 (E. Side)			56°06′58″N 3°56′21″W		B	41194	Upload Photo
Allan Park 2, 4, 6 (W. Side)			56°07′01″N 3°56′21″W		B	41197	Upload Photo
Allan Park 16 (W. Side)			56°06′59″N 3°56′24″W		B	41200	Upload Photo
21, 23, 25, Baker Street			56°07′08″N 3°56′22″W		C(S)	49656	Upload Photo
74 Baker Street			56°07′12″N 3°56′28″W		B	45373	Upload Photo
1 Bow Street			56°07′13″N 3°56′31″W		C(S)	45376	Upload Photo
3 Bow Street			56°07′13″N 3°56′31″W		C(S)	45378	Upload Photo
6 And 8 Bow Street			56°07′13″N 3°56′30″W		B	45382	Upload Photo
Snowdon Place 2, 4			56°06′43″N 3°56′22″W		C(S)	41476	Upload Photo
Southfield Crescent 1 And 16, 18 Gladstone Place			56°06′46″N 3°56′30″W		C(S)	41480	Upload Photo
Victoria Place 3, 5			56°07′05″N 3°56′45″W		C(S)	41504	Upload Photo
Victoria Place 17, 18			56°06′58″N 3°56′49″W		B	41508	Upload Photo
Victoria Place 19, 20			56°06′57″N 3°56′48″W		B	41509	Upload Photo
Victoria Place 24, 25			56°06′55″N 3°56′45″W		C(S)	41512	Upload Photo
Victoria Square 9			56°07′00″N 3°56′46″W		C(S)	41518	Upload Photo
Victoria Square 11 And 11 Victoria Place			56°07′00″N 3°56′48″W		C(S)	41519	Upload Photo
Victoria Square 13, 15			56°07′02″N 3°56′50″W		C(S)	41520	Upload Photo
1-10 (Inclusive Nos) Viewfield Place With Boundary Walls			56°07′19″N 3°56′18″W		B	41526	Upload Photo
Park Place 31-35 The Shieling			56°06′42″N 3°57′17″W		C(S)	41388	Upload Photo
Park Place 6			56°06′42″N 3°57′06″W		C(S)	41392	Upload Photo
Park Terrace, 22, 23, 24			56°06′47″N 3°56′40″W		B	41402	Upload Photo
Park Terrace 27, 28			56°06′46″N 3°56′44″W		B	41404	Upload Photo
Park Terrace 33			56°06′45″N 3°56′49″W		B	41407	Upload Photo
Port Street 69-73			56°06′58″N 3°56′12″W		C(S)	41420	Upload Photo
Port Street 75-81			56°06′58″N 3°56′13″W		C(S)	41421	Upload Photo
Port Street 16, 18, 20			56°07′02″N 3°56′13″W		B	41424	Upload Photo
Princes Street 15, 17			56°07′15″N 3°56′22″W		C(S)	41431	Upload Photo
Queen Street 7, 9 (S. Side)			56°07′20″N 3°56′22″W		B	41434	Upload Photo
Queen Street 11, 13 (S. Side)			56°07′20″N 3°56′23″W		B	41435	Upload Photo
Queen Street 23-29 (S. Side) (Odd Nos)			56°07′22″N 3°56′26″W		B	41439	Upload Photo
Queen Street 20, 22 (N. Side)			56°07′22″N 3°56′23″W		B	41445	Upload Photo
Queen Street 42, 44 (N. Side)			56°07′24″N 3°56′27″W		B	41451	Upload Photo
Queens Road 5, 6			56°07′01″N 3°56′52″W		C(S)	41456	Upload Photo
Forth Place 5, 7			56°07′18″N 3°56′08″W		B	41287	Upload Photo
Gladstone Place 17 And 12 Snowdon Place Including Boundary Wall And Railings			56°06′43″N 3°56′28″W		C(S)	41300	Upload Photo
Glebe Avenue 16, 17			56°06′59″N 3°56′27″W		C(S)	41305	Upload Photo
King Street 1 And 4, 6, 8 Port Street			56°07′03″N 3°56′13″W		B	41324	Upload Photo
King Street 37, 39, 41			56°07′04″N 3°56′17″W		C(S)	41331	Upload Photo
Lower Bridge Street 1-9			56°07′32″N 3°56′30″W		C(S)	41346	Upload Photo
Melville Terrace 3 Child Guidance Centre, Stirling District Council			56°06′53″N 3°56′18″W		B	41350	Upload Photo
Melville Terrace 5			56°06′51″N 3°56′20″W		B	41352	Upload Photo
Melville Terrace 10			56°06′47″N 3°56′21″W		B	41356	Upload Photo
Melville Terrace 11, 12			56°06′46″N 3°56′21″W		B	41357	Upload Photo
Melville Terrace 13, 14			56°06′44″N 3°56′21″W		B	41358	Upload Photo
Melville Terrace 15, 16			56°06′43″N 3°56′21″W		B	41359	Upload Photo
Melville Terrace 19			56°06′41″N 3°56′21″W		B	41361	Upload Photo
Murray Place 16-24			56°07′05″N 3°56′10″W		B	41367	Upload Photo
North Street, 31 Thistle Cottage Cambuskenneth			56°07′31″N 3°55′09″W		C(S)	41372	Upload Photo
Allan Park 24 (South End)			56°06′56″N 3°56′24″W		B	41203	Upload Photo
27 And 29 Baker Street			56°07′09″N 3°56′22″W		C(S)	41208	Upload Photo
28 And 30 Baker Street			56°07′09″N 3°56′21″W		C(S)	41220	Upload Photo
Balmoral Place 1 And 8 Victoria Place			56°07′04″N 3°56′49″W		C(S)	41222	Upload Photo
5 Bank Street And 52 Spittal Street			56°07′09″N 3°56′25″W		C(S)	41227	Upload Photo
Barn Road 30			56°07′25″N 3°56′37″W		C(S)	41228	Upload Photo
2-24 (Even Nos) Barnton Street And Maxwell Place			56°07′13″N 3°56′16″W		C(S)	41233	Upload Photo
16 (Part) And 18 Bow Street, Erskine Of Gogar's House (Commonly Known As Darnley's House)			56°07′14″N 3°56′30″W		A	41239	Upload Photo
Drummond Place 4, 6			56°06′45″N 3°56′41″W		C(S)	41276	Upload Photo
Drummond Place 8, 10			56°06′45″N 3°56′39″W		C(S)	41277	Upload Photo
32, 34 Albert Place			56°07′07″N 3°56′43″W		C(S)	41281	Upload Photo
Esplanade And Upper Castlehill, Landmark Visitor Centre (Former Castle Hotel)			56°07′22″N 3°56′41″W		B	41284	Upload Photo
St. Ninians Old Parish Kirk Kirkyard			56°06′10″N 3°56′15″W		A	41096	Upload Photo
South Church 67 Murray Place			56°07′09″N 3°56′14″W		B	41098	Upload Photo
Albert Hall 24 Dumbarton Road			56°07′05″N 3°56′31″W		B	41099	Upload Photo
Cowane's Hospital Sundial			56°07′13″N 3°56′41″W		B	41102	Upload Photo
Post Office 84 Murray Place			56°07′11″N 3°56′14″W		B	41106	Upload Photo
Black Boy Fountain, Allan Park			56°06′55″N 3°56′17″W		B	41123	Upload another image
St. Ninian's Well Wellgreen			56°06′53″N 3°56′11″W		B	41124	Upload Photo
Beheading Stone Gowanhill			56°07′40″N 3°56′34″W		C(S)	41125	Upload Photo
Stirling Railway Station, Station Road, With North And Middle Signal Boxes And Associated Semaphore Signals			56°07′11″N 3°56′08″W		A	41131	Upload another image
St Thomas' Well Farmhouse			56°06′53″N 3°57′55″W		B	41151	Upload Photo
Springkerse Springkerse House			56°06′51″N 3°55′29″W		C(S)	41152	Upload Photo
Abercromby Place 15			56°07′00″N 3°56′35″W		C(S)	41159	Upload Photo
Abercromby Place 10			56°07′01″N 3°56′32″W		C(S)	41164	Upload Photo
Airthrey Road 22, 24			56°08′21″N 3°55′28″W		C(S)	41167	Upload Photo
Albert Place 8			56°07′04″N 3°56′34″W		B	41175	Upload Photo
Albert Place 9			56°07′04″N 3°56′35″W		B	41176	Upload Photo
Albert Place 15			56°07′06″N 3°56′42″W		B	41182	Upload Photo
Albert Place 18 And 1 Victoria Place			56°07′06″N 3°56′45″W		B	41184	Upload Photo
Allan Park 1-9 (E. Side) (Odd Nos.)			56°07′01″N 3°56′19″W		B	41191	Upload Photo
Allan Park 21 Allan Park House			56°06′57″N 3°56′19″W		B	41196	Upload Photo
Allan Park 8, 10 (W. Side)			56°07′00″N 3°56′22″W		B	41198	Upload Photo
Methodist Church 19-1/2 Queen Street			56°07′21″N 3°56′24″W		B	41091	Upload Photo
St Mary's Parish Hall, Irvine Place And 17 Irvine Place (Formerly Trinity Rc Chapel)			56°07′19″N 3°56′27″W		C(S)	41094	Upload Photo
St Ninians Road, Earlsgate House Including Boundary Walls To S, W And N			56°06′35″N 3°56′19″W		B	49533	Upload Photo
60, 62, 64, 66, 68 Murray Place			56°07′10″N 3°56′13″W		C(S)	50203	Upload Photo
1, 3 And 5 Kirk Wynd And 31A And 31B Main Street, St Ninians			56°06′09″N 3°56′18″W		C(S)	41344	Upload Photo
76 Baker Street			56°07′12″N 3°56′29″W		C(S)	45374	Upload Photo
32 Spittal Street			56°07′08″N 3°56′22″W		C(S)	45389	Upload Photo
33 Spittal Street, Forth Valley Health Board And District Library (Formerly Old Infirmary)			56°07′09″N 3°56′26″W		B	43574	Upload Photo
Polmaise Road, Springwood House Including Gatepiers			56°06′34″N 3°57′03″W		B	43025	Upload Photo
3 Southfield Crescent And 21,23 Drummond Place			56°06′45″N 3°56′35″W		C(S)	41482	Upload Photo
Upper Bridge Street 28 (E Side)			56°07′25″N 3°56′29″W		C(S)	41493	Upload Photo
Upper Bridge Street 32 (E Side)			56°07′26″N 3°56′29″W		C(S)	41495	Upload Photo
Victoria Square 8, 10			56°07′04″N 3°56′44″W		C(S)	41524	Upload Photo
Park Place 37			56°06′43″N 3°57′17″W		C(S)	41390	Upload Photo
Park Terrace, 8, 9			56°06′51″N 3°56′33″W		B	41397	Upload Photo
Park Terrace, 10, 11			56°06′50″N 3°56′35″W		B	41398	Upload Photo
Park Terrace, 35			56°06′43″N 3°56′51″W		B	41409	Upload Photo
Park Terrace, 36 Aberlour Trust			56°06′41″N 3°56′54″W		B	41410	Upload Photo
Pitt Terrace, 5, 6, 7			56°06′53″N 3°56′14″W		C(S)	41412	Upload Photo
Pitt Terrace, 10, 11			56°06′51″N 3°56′15″W		B	41414	Upload Photo
Princes Street 10, 12			56°07′15″N 3°56′20″W		C(S)	41432	Upload Photo
Queen Street 15, 17 (S. Side)			56°07′21″N 3°56′23″W		B	41436	Upload Photo
Queen Street 26, 28 (N. Side)			56°07′22″N 3°56′24″W		B	41447	Upload Photo
Queen Street 30, 32 (N. Side)			56°07′23″N 3°56′25″W		B	41448	Upload Photo
19 St Ninians Road, Langgarth Lodge			56°06′43″N 3°56′18″W		B	41469	Upload Photo
Snowdon Place 7			56°06′42″N 3°56′24″W		B	41473	Upload Photo
Forth Place 25, 27			56°07′20″N 3°56′05″W		B	41292	Upload Photo
Gladstone Place 1, 3			56°06′50″N 3°56′27″W		C(S)	41295	Upload Photo
Gladstone Place 11			56°06′45″N 3°56′28″W		C(S)	41298	Upload Photo
Irvine Place 10			56°07′20″N 3°56′26″W		B	41322	Upload Photo
King Street 3, 5, 7			56°07′03″N 3°56′14″W		B	41325	Upload Photo
King Street 26, 28			56°07′06″N 3°56′16″W		B	41339	Upload Photo
King Street 36, 38			56°07′06″N 3°56′17″W		B	41340	Upload Photo
North Street, 27 Tigh Beag Cambuskenneth			56°07′31″N 3°55′10″W		C(S)	41371	Upload Photo
North Street 22-30 Cambuskenneth			56°07′30″N 3°55′12″W		C(S)	41373	Upload Photo
North Street 38 Cambuskenneth			56°07′30″N 3°55′20″W		C(S)	41374	Upload Photo
Park Place 1, Glenelm			56°06′40″N 3°57′01″W		B	41383	Upload Photo
18 Baker Street			56°07′09″N 3°56′20″W		C(S)	41218	Upload Photo
Balmoral Place 5 Park View			56°07′05″N 3°56′51″W		C(S)	41224	Upload Photo
11-39 (Odd Nos) Barnton Street			56°07′13″N 3°56′18″W		C(S)	41232	Upload Photo
41 Broad Street, Church Wynd And 38 And 40 St John Street			56°07′15″N 3°56′36″W		C(S)	41244	Upload Photo
12 And 14 Broad Street, Provost Stevensons' Lodging			56°07′16″N 3°56′33″W		B	41245	Upload Photo
24 Broad Street			56°07′16″N 3°56′36″W		B	41250	Upload Photo
26 Broad Street With Gatepiers			56°07′16″N 3°56′36″W		B	41252	Upload Photo
Castle Wynd The Portcullis Hotel Formerly Old Grammar School			56°07′19″N 3°56′40″W		B	41256	Upload Photo
Clarendon Place 12			56°06′56″N 3°56′41″W		C(S)	41265	Upload Photo
Clifford Road 1, 2			56°06′31″N 3°56′22″W		C(S)	41266	Upload Photo
Clifford Road Lime Grove Hotel			56°06′31″N 3°56′16″W		C(S)	41269	Upload Photo
Drummond Place 3, 5			56°06′46″N 3°56′38″W		C(S)	41275	Upload Photo
Drummond Place 12, 14			56°06′44″N 3°56′38″W		C(S)	41278	Upload Photo
36, 38 Albert Place			56°07′08″N 3°56′44″W		C(S)	41282	Upload Photo
St Ninians Old Parish Kirk Kirk Wynd			56°06′09″N 3°56′16″W		A	41095	Upload another image
Esplanade, Princess Louise`S Xc1 Battalion South African War Memorial			56°07′23″N 3°56′47″W		C(S)	41117	Upload another image
Stirling Castle Palace (1539-42)			56°07′25″N 3°56′53″W		A	41138	Upload another image
Abercromby Place 14, 16			56°07′02″N 3°56′35″W		B	41166	Upload Photo
Albert Place 3			56°07′03″N 3°56′28″W		B	41170	Upload Photo
Albert Place 5			56°07′03″N 3°56′30″W		C(S)	41172	Upload Photo
Albert Place 10 And 1 Clarendon Place			56°07′04″N 3°56′36″W		B	41177	Upload Photo
Albert Place 11 And 2 Clarendon Place			56°07′05″N 3°56′38″W		B	41178	Upload Photo
Albert Place 13			56°07′05″N 3°56′40″W		B	41180	Upload Photo
Albert Place 24, 25			56°07′07″N 3°56′50″W		B	41188	Upload Photo
Albert Place 26			56°07′08″N 3°56′51″W		B	41189	Upload Photo
Allan Park 11, 11A (E. Side)			56°07′00″N 3°56′20″W		B	41192	Upload Photo
29 St John Street, Erskine Marykirk			56°07′11″N 3°56′37″W		B	41087	Upload another image
St Columba's Church Of Scotland (The Peter Memorial) And Halls Kings Park Road			56°06′53″N 3°56′21″W		B	41092	Upload Photo
St Mary's Catholic Church 15 Upper Bridge Street			56°07′25″N 3°56′33″W		B	41093	Upload another image
58,60,62,64,66,68,70 Port Street			56°06′58″N 3°56′15″W		C(S)	49599	Upload Photo
Kings Park, Drinking Fountain			56°06′50″N 3°56′45″W		B	50208	Upload another image
78 Baker Street			56°07′12″N 3°56′30″W		C(S)	45375	Upload Photo
Torbrex 14 Torbrex Village			56°06′19″N 3°56′57″W		C(S)	41487	Upload Photo
Upper Bridge Street 11 (W Side) Manse			56°07′23″N 3°56′32″W		B	41490	Upload Photo
Upper Bridge Street 42 (E Side)			56°07′27″N 3°56′29″W		C(S)	41497	Upload Photo
Upper Castlehill Mar Lodge, (Fronts Upper Castlehill) At Junction Of Castle Wynd. Classified As Being On Mar Place Though It Has No Frontage To It			56°07′20″N 3°56′37″W		B	41502	Upload Photo
Victoria Square 1, 3			56°06′59″N 3°56′42″W		B	41516	Upload Photo
Victoria Square 2 And 6 Clarendon Place			56°07′03″N 3°56′40″W		C(S)	41522	Upload Photo
Victoria Square 4, 6			56°07′03″N 3°56′42″W		C(S)	41523	Upload Photo
Park Place 39, 41			56°06′43″N 3°57′19″W		C(S)	41391	Upload Photo
Park Terrace 3			56°06′51″N 3°56′27″W		B	41395	Upload Photo
Park Terrace, 12, 13			56°06′50″N 3°56′37″W		B	41399	Upload Photo
Park Terrace, 14-17			56°06′49″N 3°56′38″W		B	41400	Upload Photo
Park Terrace, 34 The Whins			56°06′44″N 3°56′50″W		B	41408	Upload Photo
Pitt Terrace, 8, 9			56°06′52″N 3°56′15″W		B	41413	Upload Photo
Princes Street 9, 11			56°07′14″N 3°56′21″W		C(S)	41429	Upload Photo
Randolph Road 23, 25			56°06′22″N 3°56′18″W		B	41458	Upload Photo
Royal Gardens 2, 3, 4, 5			56°07′10″N 3°56′49″W		C(S)	41459	Upload Photo
Royal Gardens 6, 7, 8, 9			56°07′11″N 3°56′48″W		C(S)	41460	Upload Photo
33 St John Street			56°07′14″N 3°56′37″W		B	41462	Upload Photo
36 St John Street Boy's Club			56°07′14″N 3°56′36″W		C(S)	41465	Upload another image
Gladstone Place 2			56°06′51″N 3°56′30″W		B	41301	Upload Photo
Glebe Avenue 20, 21			56°06′58″N 3°56′28″W		C(S)	41307	Upload Photo
Glebe Crescent 8, 10			56°06′55″N 3°56′30″W		C(S)	41313	Upload Photo
King Street 21, 23, 25 Royal Bank Of Scotland			56°07′04″N 3°56′15″W		B	41328	Upload Photo
King Street 47, 49, 51			56°07′05″N 3°56′18″W		B	41333	Upload Photo
King Street 61 And 1 Corn Exchange Road Clydesdale Bank Buildings			56°07′06″N 3°56′19″W		B	41335	Upload another image
King Street 4 Clydesdale Bank Ltd			56°07′04″N 3°56′13″W		C(S)	41336	Upload Photo
King Street, 6-10 Golden Lion Hotel			56°07′05″N 3°56′14″W		C(S)	41337	Upload Photo
Kirk Wynd, Formerly The Old Manse, St Ninians			56°06′12″N 3°56′16″W		B	41345	Upload Photo
Melville Terrace 1, 2 (Exclude Late Addition To No 1)			56°06′54″N 3°56′18″W		B	41349	Upload Photo
Melville Terrace 7			56°06′49″N 3°56′21″W		B	41354	Upload Photo
Melville Terrace 17, 18			56°06′42″N 3°56′21″W		B	41360	Upload Photo
North Street 40 Abbey Inn			56°07′30″N 3°55′09″W		C(S)	41375	Upload another image See more images
Park Place 19, 21			56°06′42″N 3°57′10″W		B	41386	Upload Photo
31, 33 And 35 Baker Street			56°07′09″N 3°56′23″W		C(S)	41209	Upload Photo
37, 39A, 39B, 41A And 41 Baker Street			56°07′09″N 3°56′23″W		C(S)	41210	Upload Photo
14 Baker Street			56°07′09″N 3°56′20″W		C(S)	41217	Upload Photo
Balmoral Place 2, 4			56°07′03″N 3°56′50″W		C(S)	41225	Upload Photo
Barnton Street, Fountain			56°07′16″N 3°56′18″W		C(S)	41230	Upload Photo
36-42 (Even Nos) Barnton Street			56°07′14″N 3°56′17″W		C(S)	41234	Upload Photo
20 Bow Street			56°07′14″N 3°56′30″W		C(S)	41241	Upload Photo
Clarendon Place 5 And 18 Abercromby Place			56°07′02″N 3°56′37″W		B	41258	Upload Photo
Clarendon Place 13, 15			56°06′59″N 3°56′39″W		B	41261	Upload Photo
Clarendon Place 17			56°06′58″N 3°56′39″W		B	41262	Upload Photo
Clarendon Place 4			56°07′04″N 3°56′39″W		C(S)	41263	Upload Photo
Clarendon Place 10			56°06′57″N 3°56′42″W		C(S)	41264	Upload Photo
Dalgleish Court (Off Baker Street) Youth House, Stirling And District Bn Bb			56°07′11″N 3°56′20″W		B	41274	Upload Photo
Forth Crescent 29 30			56°07′26″N 3°55′48″W		C(S)	41285	Upload Photo
St Ninians Parish Church Hall, Kirk Wynd			56°06′10″N 3°56′18″W		C(S)	41097	Upload Photo
Back Walk, Town Wall, South Boundary Of Erskine Marykirk And St John Street Housing Development To Academy Street			56°07′09″N 3°56′36″W		A	41111	Upload Photo
Broad Street, Mercat Cross			56°07′15″N 3°56′33″W		B	41115	Upload Photo
Stirling Castle Kitchen Range And Grand Battery			56°07′26″N 3°56′50″W		A	41142	Upload Photo
Stirling Castle The King's Old Building			56°07′26″N 3°56′55″W		A	41143	Upload Photo
Beechwood Newhouse Road			56°06′24″N 3°56′31″W		B	41148	Upload Photo
Abercromby Place 2, 4			56°07′01″N 3°56′29″W		C(S)	41161	Upload Photo
Abercromby Place 6			56°07′01″N 3°56′30″W		C(S)	41162	Upload Photo
Albert Place 2			56°07′03″N 3°56′27″W		B	41169	Upload Photo
Albert Place 19 And 2 Victoria Place			56°07′07″N 3°56′47″W		B	41185	Upload Photo
Church Of The Holy Rood St John Street			56°07′15″N 3°56′40″W		A	41083	Upload another image
St John Street, Ebenezer Erskine Monument			56°07′12″N 3°56′36″W		B	41088	Upload Photo
Pitt Terrace, Viewforth (Stirling Council Offices), Including Entrance Gateways And Boundary Wall To West			56°06′48″N 3°56′13″W		B	48323	Upload another image
Irvine Place, Viewfield Church Including Boundary Wall			56°07′17″N 3°56′21″W		C(S)	50207	Upload Photo
Drinking Fountain, Queen's Park Road			56°06′58″N 3°56′51″W		C(S)	50903	Upload Photo
4 Bow Street			56°07′13″N 3°56′30″W		C(S)	45381	Upload Photo
1 And 3 Broad Street			56°07′14″N 3°56′32″W		C(S)	45386	Upload Photo
10 Broad Street			56°07′15″N 3°56′33″W		C(S)	45388	Upload Photo
Spittal Street, Allan's School With Boundary Walls			56°07′07″N 3°56′25″W		B	45390	Upload Photo
Snowdon Place 14			56°06′43″N 3°56′36″W		B	41477	Upload Photo
54 Spittal Street, Spittal's Hospital			56°07′11″N 3°56′29″W		B	41483	Upload Photo
Upper Bridge Street 52, 54 (E Side)			56°07′28″N 3°56′28″W		C(S)	41501	Upload Photo
Victoria Place 10, 12			56°07′01″N 3°56′50″W		C(S)	41506	Upload Photo
Victoria Place 13, 15			56°07′02″N 3°56′50″W		C(S)	41507	Upload Photo
Park Place 35, The Shieling, Gazebo			56°06′42″N 3°57′19″W		C(S)	41389	Upload Photo
Port Street 65, 67			56°06′58″N 3°56′13″W		C(S)	41419	Upload Photo
Port Street 80			56°06′57″N 3°56′15″W		B	41427	Upload Photo
Queen Street 31, 33 (S. Side)			56°07′23″N 3°56′28″W		B	41440	Upload Photo
39 And 41 St John Street, Bruce Of Auchenbowie's House			56°07′14″N 3°56′37″W		A	41464	Upload Photo
St Mary's Wynd John Cowane's House			56°07′20″N 3°56′34″W		A	41466	Upload Photo
Forth Place 21, 23			56°07′20″N 3°56′05″W		B	41291	Upload Photo
Gladstone Place 4			56°06′49″N 3°56′30″W		C(S)	41302	Upload Photo
Glebe Crescent 1			56°06′57″N 3°56′28″W		C(S)	41308	Upload Photo
King Street 22, 24 Bank Of Scotland Buildings			56°07′05″N 3°56′16″W		B	41338	Upload Photo
Melville Terrace 20			56°06′40″N 3°56′21″W		B	41362	Upload Photo
Murray Place, 80, 82 National Commercial Bank Buildings			56°07′11″N 3°56′14″W		B	41368	Upload Photo
Park Avenue 5 And 9 Glebe Crescent			56°06′54″N 3°56′26″W		C(S)	41378	Upload Photo
Park Avenue 6			56°06′54″N 3°56′31″W		C(S)	41379	Upload Photo
Park Avenue 9, 26 And 28 Clarendon Place			56°06′51″N 3°56′37″W		C(S)	41381	Upload Photo
49 And 51 Baker Street			56°07′09″N 3°56′24″W		B	41213	Upload Photo
8 Baker Street			56°07′08″N 3°56′19″W		C(S)	41215	Upload Photo
9 And 9 And A Half Barnton Street			56°07′11″N 3°56′17″W		C(S)	41231	Upload Photo
Birkhill Road 4			56°06′45″N 3°57′29″W		C(S)	41238	Upload Photo
16 Bow Street (Part, Within Close), Moir Of Leckie's House			56°07′14″N 3°56′28″W		A	41240	Upload Photo
Brentham Park House Brentham Crescent			56°06′35″N 3°56′08″W		B	41242	Upload Photo
39 And 39A Broad Street			56°07′15″N 3°56′36″W		B	41243	Upload Photo
58 Broad Street, Mar Place House			56°07′16″N 3°56′37″W		B	41253	Upload Photo
Castle Wynd Argyll Lodging (Including Garden Wall.) Now Youth Hostel			56°07′18″N 3°56′37″W		A	41255	Upload another image
Clarendon Place 3			56°07′03″N 3°56′36″W		C(S)	41257	Upload Photo
Clifford Road 5, 6			56°06′30″N 3°56′19″W		C(S)	41268	Upload Photo
28 Albert Place And 1 Clarendon Road			56°07′06″N 3°56′37″W		C(S)	41279	Upload Photo
Sheriff Court Buildings Viewfield Place			56°07′17″N 3°56′17″W		B	41108	Upload another image
Back Walk, Town Wall And Bastion, Boundary Of Municipal Buildings, 27-33 (Odd Nos) Spittal Street And Old High School			56°07′06″N 3°56′26″W		A	41112	Upload Photo
Public Library To 16 Dumbarton Road Being S Boundary Of 16 Dumbarton Road, 2, 4 Back Walk, 51 King Street 15 And 19 Corn Exchange Road			56°07′04″N 3°56′20″W		A	41113	Upload Photo
George Christie Memorial Clock Allan Park			56°06′56″N 3°56′16″W		C(S)	41116	Upload another image
Wallace Monument Abbey Craig			56°08′20″N 3°55′04″W		A	41118	Upload another image
Stirling, Old Bridge			56°07′43″N 3°56′12″W		A	41129	Upload another image See more images
Stirling Castle The Mint (14Th Century)			56°07′27″N 3°56′51″W		A	41141	Upload Photo
Stirling Castle, Married Quarters On King`S Stables Lane And Barn Road			56°07′22″N 3°56′39″W		C(S)	41146	Upload Photo
Abercromby Place 17, 19			56°07′01″N 3°56′36″W		C(S)	41160	Upload Photo
Abercromby Place 8			56°07′01″N 3°56′31″W		C(S)	41163	Upload Photo
Albert Place 6			56°07′04″N 3°56′32″W		C(S)	41173	Upload Photo
Albert Place 16, 17			56°07′06″N 3°56′43″W		B	41183	Upload Photo
Albert Place 21			56°07′07″N 3°56′48″W		C(S)	41186	Upload Photo
Allan Park 13, 15 (E. Side)			56°06′59″N 3°56′20″W		B	41193	Upload Photo
Dumbarton Road, Allan Park South Church Including Gates And Railings			56°07′03″N 3°56′22″W		B	47613	Upload Photo
52, 54, 56 Port Street			56°06′59″N 3°56′14″W		B	49577	Upload Photo
2 Baker Street And 1 Friars Street, Hog's Head Public House			56°07′08″N 3°56′19″W		C(S)	45363	Upload Photo
56 And 58 Baker Street			56°07′11″N 3°56′25″W		C(S)	45369	Upload Photo
62 Baker Street			56°07′11″N 3°56′26″W		C(S)	45371	Upload Photo
70 And 72 Baker Street			56°07′11″N 3°56′27″W		B	45372	Upload Photo
South Street 18 Cambuskenneth			56°07′27″N 3°55′12″W		C(S)	41478	Upload Photo
56 Spittal Street, Glengarry Lodge Or Darrow Lodging			56°07′11″N 3°56′30″W		A	41484	Upload Photo
Torbrex Torbrex Inn Torbrex Village			56°06′17″N 3°57′01″W		C(S)	41488	Upload Photo
Upper Bridge Street 48 (E Side)			56°07′27″N 3°56′29″W		C(S)	41499	Upload Photo
Upper Bridge Street 50 (E Side)			56°07′28″N 3°56′29″W		C(S)	41500	Upload Photo
Victoria Place 4, 6			56°07′05″N 3°56′47″W		C(S)	41505	Upload Photo
Victoria Square Garfield Hotel			56°07′04″N 3°56′46″W		C(S)	41525	Upload Photo
Park Terrace, 32			56°06′45″N 3°56′47″W		B	41406	Upload Photo
Endrick Lodge, Lodge And Gates			56°06′33″N 3°57′09″W		B	41417	Upload Photo
Port Street 38, 40 And 2, 4 Dumbarton Road			56°07′01″N 3°56′13″W		B	41425	Upload Photo
Princes Street 13			56°07′15″N 3°56′22″W		C(S)	41430	Upload Photo
Queen Street 10, 12 (N. Side)			56°07′21″N 3°56′22″W		B	41443	Upload Photo
Queen Street 14, 16, 18 (N. Side)			56°07′22″N 3°56′23″W		B	41444	Upload Photo
Queen Street 36 (N. Side)			56°07′23″N 3°56′26″W		B	41449	Upload Photo
Queens Road 4			56°07′02″N 3°56′53″W		C(S)	41455	Upload Photo
Queens Road 7 & 16 Victoria Place			56°07′00″N 3°56′51″W		C(S)	41457	Upload another image
St Ninians Road 13, 15 Langgarth			56°06′43″N 3°56′12″W		B	41468	Upload Photo
Gladstone Place 5, 7			56°06′49″N 3°56′27″W		C(S)	41296	Upload Photo
Gladstone Place 6, 8			56°06′49″N 3°56′31″W		C(S)	41303	Upload Photo
Glebe Crescent 16			56°06′53″N 3°56′29″W		C(S)	41315	Upload Photo
Hillfoots Road, Abbey Craig Park House, Walls And Gates			56°08′22″N 3°55′18″W		B	41317	Upload Photo
Irvine Place 13, 15			56°07′19″N 3°56′27″W		B	41318	Upload Photo
Irvine Place 4			56°07′19″N 3°56′24″W		B	41320	Upload Photo
King Street 42-48 (Even Nos)			56°07′07″N 3°56′16″W		B	41342	Upload Photo
Mar Place Mar's Wark			56°07′16″N 3°56′39″W		A	41348	Upload another image
Murray Place 3, 5, 7			56°07′04″N 3°56′13″W		B	41364	Upload Photo
Park Place 17			56°06′42″N 3°57′08″W		B	41385	Upload Photo
Allan Park 22 (West Side)			56°06′57″N 3°56′25″W		B	41202	Upload Photo
10 And 12 Baker Street			56°07′08″N 3°56′20″W		C(S)	41216	Upload Photo
Birkhill Road 2 Cliffside			56°06′45″N 3°57′27″W		B	41237	Upload Photo
16 Broad Street, East Section Of James Norrie's Lodging			56°07′15″N 3°56′34″W		A	41246	Upload Photo
18 Broad Street (Part), East Section Of Graham Of Panholes Lodging			56°07′16″N 3°56′34″W		B	41247	Upload Photo
18 Broad Street (Part), W Section Of James Norrie's Lodging			56°07′15″N 3°56′34″W		B	41248	Upload Photo
Castle Wynd Valley Lodge			56°07′18″N 3°56′40″W		B	41254	Upload Photo
Public Library, Corn Exchange Road			56°07′05″N 3°56′21″W		B	41107	Upload another image See more images
40 Albert Place Smith Art Gallery And Museum Including Lamp Standards			56°07′09″N 3°56′46″W		B	41109	Upload another image
War Memorial Corn Exchange Road			56°07′04″N 3°56′24″W		B	41119	Upload another image
Campbell Bannerman Sir Henry, Monument To, Corn Exchange Road			56°07′05″N 3°56′24″W		B	41122	Upload another image
Stirling New Bridge			56°07′40″N 3°56′11″W		B	41130	Upload Photo
Stirling Castle (Comprising): Outer Defences The Counter Guard(1708-14)			56°07′24″N 3°56′49″W		A	41136	Upload another image
Stirling Castle Chapel Royal (1594)			56°07′27″N 3°56′54″W		A	41140	Upload another image
Abercromby Place 1			56°06′59″N 3°56′29″W		C(S)	41154	Upload Photo
Abercromby Place 11			56°07′00″N 3°56′33″W		C(S)	41157	Upload Photo
Albert Place 7			56°07′04″N 3°56′32″W		B	41174	Upload Photo
Albert Place 22, 23			56°07′07″N 3°56′49″W		B	41187	Upload Photo
Albert Place 27			56°07′08″N 3°56′52″W		B	41190	Upload Photo
Allan Park 12, 14 (W. Side)			56°07′00″N 3°56′23″W		B	41199	Upload Photo
Baptist Church 52 Murray Place			56°07′08″N 3°56′10″W		C(S)	41085	Upload Photo
Holy Trinity Episcopal Church 26 Dumbarton Road			56°07′06″N 3°56′34″W		A	41089	Upload another image See more images
Stirling, Drip Road, Kildean Day Hospital Including Boundary Wall And Gatepiers			56°07′54″N 3°57′19″W		C(S)	48879	Upload Photo
10 And 12 Bow Street			56°07′14″N 3°56′30″W		C(S)	45383	Upload Photo
21 Broad Street			56°07′14″N 3°56′33″W		C(S)	45387	Upload Photo
Torbrex 2 Torbrex Village			56°06′20″N 3°56′53″W		C(S)	41485	Upload Photo
Upper Bridge Street 15 (W Side) St Mary's Rc Presbytery			56°07′26″N 3°56′34″W		B	41491	Upload Photo
Upper Bridge Street 44, 46 (E Side)			56°07′27″N 3°56′29″W		C(S)	41498	Upload Photo
Upper Craigs 78 Craigs House (Masonic Hall)			56°06′55″N 3°56′02″W		B	41503	Upload Photo
Victoria Place 21			56°06′57″N 3°56′47″W		B	41510	Upload Photo
Victoria Place 34, 35, 36			56°06′51″N 3°56′42″W		C(S)	41514	Upload Photo
14 Windsor Place, The Inclosure			56°06′57″N 3°56′36″W		C(S)	41529	Upload Photo
Park Terrace 1, 2			56°06′52″N 3°56′24″W		B	41394	Upload Photo
Park Terrace, 6, 7			56°06′51″N 3°56′32″W		B	41396	Upload Photo
Port Street 42 And 1, 3, 5 Dumbarton Road			56°06′59″N 3°56′14″W		C(S)	41426	Upload Photo
Queen Street 21 (S. Side)			56°07′22″N 3°56′25″W		B	41438	Upload Photo
Royal Gardens 10, 11			56°07′12″N 3°56′47″W		C(S)	41461	Upload Photo
91, St. Marys Wynd, Settle Inn			56°07′21″N 3°56′32″W		C(S)	41467	Upload Photo
St Ninians Road Randolphfield (Formerly Stirling District Police Department)			56°06′36″N 3°56′32″W		C(S)	41471	Upload Photo
Forth Place 17, 19			56°07′19″N 3°56′06″W		B	41290	Upload Photo
Gladstone Place 9 Forth Valley Health Board			56°06′47″N 3°56′27″W		C(S)	41297	Upload Photo
Gladstone Place 10, 12			56°06′47″N 3°56′31″W		C(S)	41304	Upload Photo
Irvine Place 6, 8			56°07′19″N 3°56′25″W		B	41321	Upload Photo
Irvine Place 12			56°07′20″N 3°56′27″W		C(S)	41323	Upload Photo
King Street 27, 29			56°07′04″N 3°56′16″W		C(S)	41329	Upload Photo
King Street 50, 52 And Friars Street, Bank Of Scotland Buildings			56°07′07″N 3°56′18″W		B	41343	Upload Photo
Melville Terrace 4 Terraces Hotel			56°06′52″N 3°56′19″W		B	41351	Upload Photo
Park Avenue 10 And 11			56°06′51″N 3°56′39″W		C(S)	41382	Upload Photo
9 And 11 Baker Street And Sma' Vennel			56°07′08″N 3°56′21″W		C(S)	41205	Upload Photo
3 Bank Street			56°07′09″N 3°56′25″W		C(S)	41226	Upload Photo
52-56 (Even Nos) Barnton Street			56°07′15″N 3°56′18″W		C(S)	41235	Upload Photo
20 And 22 Broad Street			56°07′16″N 3°56′35″W		B	41249	Upload Photo
Clarendon Place 7 And 21 Abercromby Place			56°07′01″N 3°56′37″W		C(S)	41259	Upload Photo
Clifford Road 10, 11			56°06′32″N 3°56′18″W		C(S)	41270	Upload Photo
42 Albert Place And 1 Royal Gardens			56°07′09″N 3°56′50″W		B	41283	Upload Photo
Cowane's Hospital (Now Guildhall) Including Adjoining Terrace To Bowling Green 47, 49 St John Street And Lampstands			56°07′14″N 3°56′42″W		A	41101	Upload another image
Drillhall Princes Street (Front Building Only)			56°07′17″N 3°56′26″W		B	41103	Upload Photo
8 And 10 Corn Exchange Road, Municipal Buildings			56°07′06″N 3°56′22″W		B	41105	Upload another image See more images
35, 37 Broad Street, Jail Wynd And 32 St John Street, Tolbooth			56°07′14″N 3°56′34″W		A	41110	Upload another image See more images
The Old Town Cemeteries			56°07′17″N 3°56′42″W		A	41126	Upload another image
Abercromby Place 3,5			56°06′59″N 3°56′30″W		C(S)	41155	Upload Photo
Albert Place 1			56°07′03″N 3°56′26″W		B	41168	Upload Photo
Albert Place 4			56°07′03″N 3°56′29″W		B	41171	Upload Photo
Allan Park 19 (E. Side)			56°06′57″N 3°56′22″W		B	41195	Upload Photo
Church Of The Holy-Rood Churchyard			56°07′17″N 3°56′42″W		A	41084	Upload another image
Cambuskenneth Abbey			56°07′24″N 3°55′05″W		A	41086	Upload another image
2 Bow Street, Hermon Evangelical Church			56°07′12″N 3°56′30″W		C(S)	45379	Upload Photo
Snowdon Place 15 Racc/Reme Officers Mess			56°06′42″N 3°56′33″W		B	41475	Upload Photo
South Street 20 Cambuskenneth			56°07′27″N 3°55′12″W		C(S)	41479	Upload Photo
Southfield Crescent 2			56°06′46″N 3°56′33″W		B	41481	Upload Photo
Upper Bridge Street 26 (E Side)			56°07′24″N 3°56′29″W		C(S)	41492	Upload Photo
Upper Bridge Street 36-40 (E Side)			56°07′26″N 3°56′29″W		C(S)	41496	Upload Photo
Victoria Place 26, 27			56°06′55″N 3°56′45″W		C(S)	41513	Upload Photo
Park Terrace 18-21			56°06′49″N 3°56′39″W		B	41401	Upload Photo
Pitt Terrace, 3			56°06′54″N 3°56′14″W		B	41411	Upload Photo
Polmaise Road Endrick Lodge			56°06′30″N 3°57′13″W		B	41416	Upload Photo
Port Street 25, 27			56°07′02″N 3°56′12″W		C(S)	41418	Upload Photo
Port Street 10, 12, 14			56°07′02″N 3°56′14″W		B	41423	Upload Photo
Princes Street 5			56°07′14″N 3°56′20″W		C(S)	41428	Upload Photo
Queen Street 24 (N. Side)			56°07′22″N 3°56′24″W		B	41446	Upload Photo
Queens Road 1			56°07′06″N 3°56′53″W		C(S)	41452	Upload Photo
Queens Road 3			56°07′04″N 3°56′53″W		C(S)	41454	Upload Photo
Forth Place 1, 3			56°07′18″N 3°56′08″W		B	41286	Upload Photo
Friars Street 29, 31			56°07′10″N 3°56′17″W		C(S)	41293	Upload Photo
Glebe Crescent 3, 5			56°06′55″N 3°56′28″W		C(S)	41309	Upload Photo
King Street 33, 35			56°07′04″N 3°56′16″W		C(S)	41330	Upload Photo
Park Avenue 2			56°06′54″N 3°56′22″W		C(S)	41376	Upload Photo
Park Avenue 7, 7A And 8			56°06′53″N 3°56′35″W		C(S)	41380	Upload Photo
13 And 15 Baker Street			56°07′08″N 3°56′21″W		C(S)	41206	Upload Photo
4 Polmaise Road, Batterflats			56°06′37″N 3°57′12″W		B	41207	Upload Photo
84 Baker Street, Sauchie House With Gatepiers And Boundary Walls			56°07′13″N 3°56′26″W		B	41221	Upload Photo
Balmoral Place 3			56°07′05″N 3°56′50″W		C(S)	41223	Upload Photo
Clifford Road 3, 4			56°06′31″N 3°56′21″W		C(S)	41267	Upload Photo
30 Albert Place			56°07′07″N 3°56′39″W		C(S)	41280	Upload Photo
2 Spittal Street And 65, 67 King Street, Athenaeum			56°07′07″N 3°56′19″W		A	41100	Upload another image
31 St John Street, Stirling Old Town Jail (Former Military Prison) With Boundary Walls, Gatepiers And Gates			56°07′12″N 3°56′39″W		A	41104	Upload another image
Bruce Statue Esplanade			56°07′24″N 3°56′46″W		C(S)	41120	Upload Photo
Academy Road, Stirling Highland Hotel, Old High School			56°07′08″N 3°56′32″W		A	41133	Upload another image See more images
31 Spittal Street Snowdon School With Boundary Walls And Gate Piers			56°07′08″N 3°56′25″W		C(S)	41135	Upload Photo
Stirling Castle Forework (1500-1510)			56°07′25″N 3°56′50″W		A	41137	Upload another image
Stirling Castle Sundial			56°07′28″N 3°56′56″W		A	41144	Upload Photo
Stirling Castle Regimental Headquarters			56°07′26″N 3°56′49″W		A	41145	Upload Photo
Abercromby Place 12			56°07′02″N 3°56′34″W		C(S)	41165	Upload Photo
Albert Place 12			56°07′05″N 3°56′39″W		B	41179	Upload Photo
Albert Place 14			56°07′06″N 3°56′41″W		B	41181	Upload Photo
Allan Park 20 (W. Side) Allan Park Hotel			56°06′58″N 3°56′25″W		B	41201	Upload Photo
53 Baker Street And 1 Bank Street			56°07′10″N 3°56′24″W		B	41090	Upload Photo

== Key ==
The scheme for classifying buildings in Scotland is:

- Category A: "buildings of national or international importance, either architectural or historic; or fine, little-altered examples of some particular period, style or building type."
- Category B: "buildings of regional or more than local importance; or major examples of some particular period, style or building type, which may have been altered."
- Category C: "buildings of local importance; lesser examples of any period, style, or building type, as originally constructed or moderately altered; and simple traditional buildings which group well with other listed buildings."

In March 2016 there were 47,288 listed buildings in Scotland. Of these, 8% were Category A, and 50% were Category B, with the remaining 42% being Category C.
