= Central Region, Scotland =

Local government region in Scotland

Coordinates: 56.063°N 3.796°W

Central Region Roinn Meadhanach
- Former region

- Area
- 263,455 hectares (651,010 acres)
- Population
- c. 272,900
- History
  - Origin: Local Government (Scotland) Act 1973
  - Created: 16 May 1975
  - Abolished: 31 March 1996
  - Succeeded by: Clackmannanshire; Falkirk; Stirling
- Government: Central Regional Council
  - Type: Regional Council
  - HQ: Viewforth, Stirling

Central region was a local government region from 1975 to 1996, being one of twelve such regions across Scotland. The Regional Council's headquarters were at Viewforth in Stirling, which had been previously the headquarters of Stirlingshire County Council. Since 1996 the area has been divided into the council areas of Clackmannanshire, Falkirk and Stirling, which had previously been districts within Central region.

== History ==
Central region was created in 1975 under the Local Government (Scotland) Act 1973, which established a two-tier structure of local government across mainland Scotland comprising upper-tier regions and lower-tier districts. Central region covered the whole area of the county of Clackmannanshire, most of Stirlingshire and parts of Perthshire and West Lothian, which were all abolished for local government purposes at the same time. Central region was divided into three districts, called Clackmannan, Falkirk, and Stirling.

The Dunblane massacre occurred within the last month of Central Regional Council's existence at one of its primary schools, in Dunblane. Responsibility for Dunblane Primary School was transferred to the new Stirling Council on the first day of its operations on 1 April 1996 when the Scottish Regional Councils disbanded under the reorganisation act of 1994. 10 days later, on 11 April 1996, the school gym where the massacre took place was demolished by the new council. The school was entirely refurbished in 1998.

Central region was abolished in 1996 under the Local Government etc. (Scotland) Act 1994, which replaced regions and districts with unitary council areas. Each of Central's three districts became a separate council area, with Clackmannan district changing its name to Clackmannanshire with effect from 1 April 1996, being the day the new arrangements came in to effect.

The Central Scotland Police force, created in 1975 using the same boundaries as the region, was merged into Police Scotland in 2013 with its territory forming one of the second-level divisions from that point. At the same time, the Central Scotland Fire and Rescue Service became part of the new Scottish Fire and Rescue Service.

There continue to be electoral, valuation, and health boards for the area; the latter is called NHS Forth Valley.

== Political control ==
The first election to Central Regional Council was held in 1974, initially operating as a shadow authority alongside the outgoing authorities until the new system came into force on 16 May 1975. Political control of the council from 1975 was as follows:

Party in control	Years
No overall control	1975–1978
Labour	1978–1996

== Premises ==
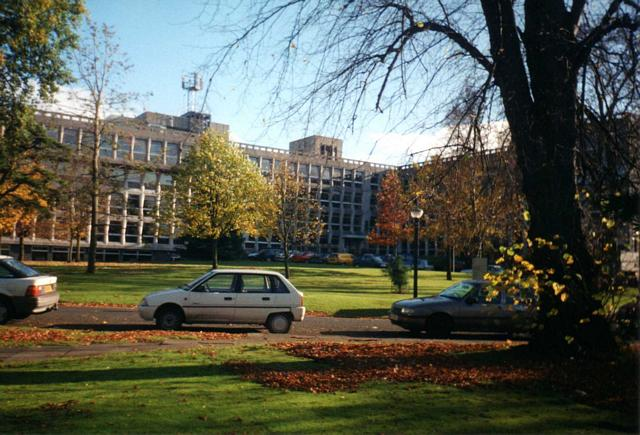
Regional Headquarters at Viewforth

At the time of the local government reorganization of 1975, there was discussion on where the new region should be based – the options being Falkirk or Stirling, the latter of which was chosen as the county council had just finished construction of a new office building at Viewforth in the town in 1972.

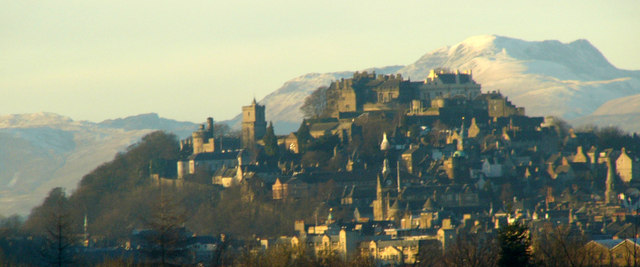
View of Stirling

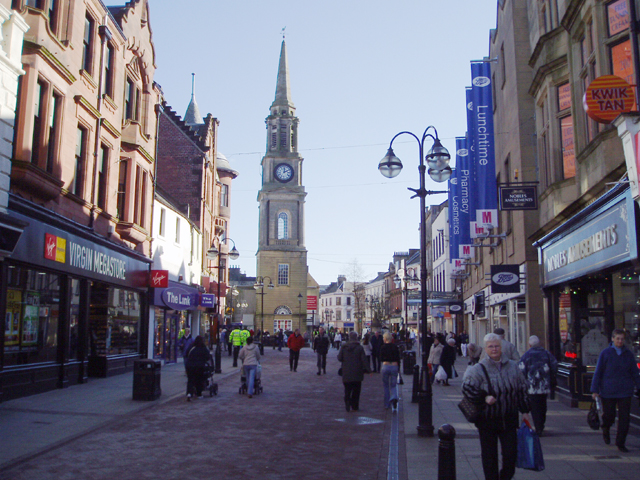
Falkirk High Street

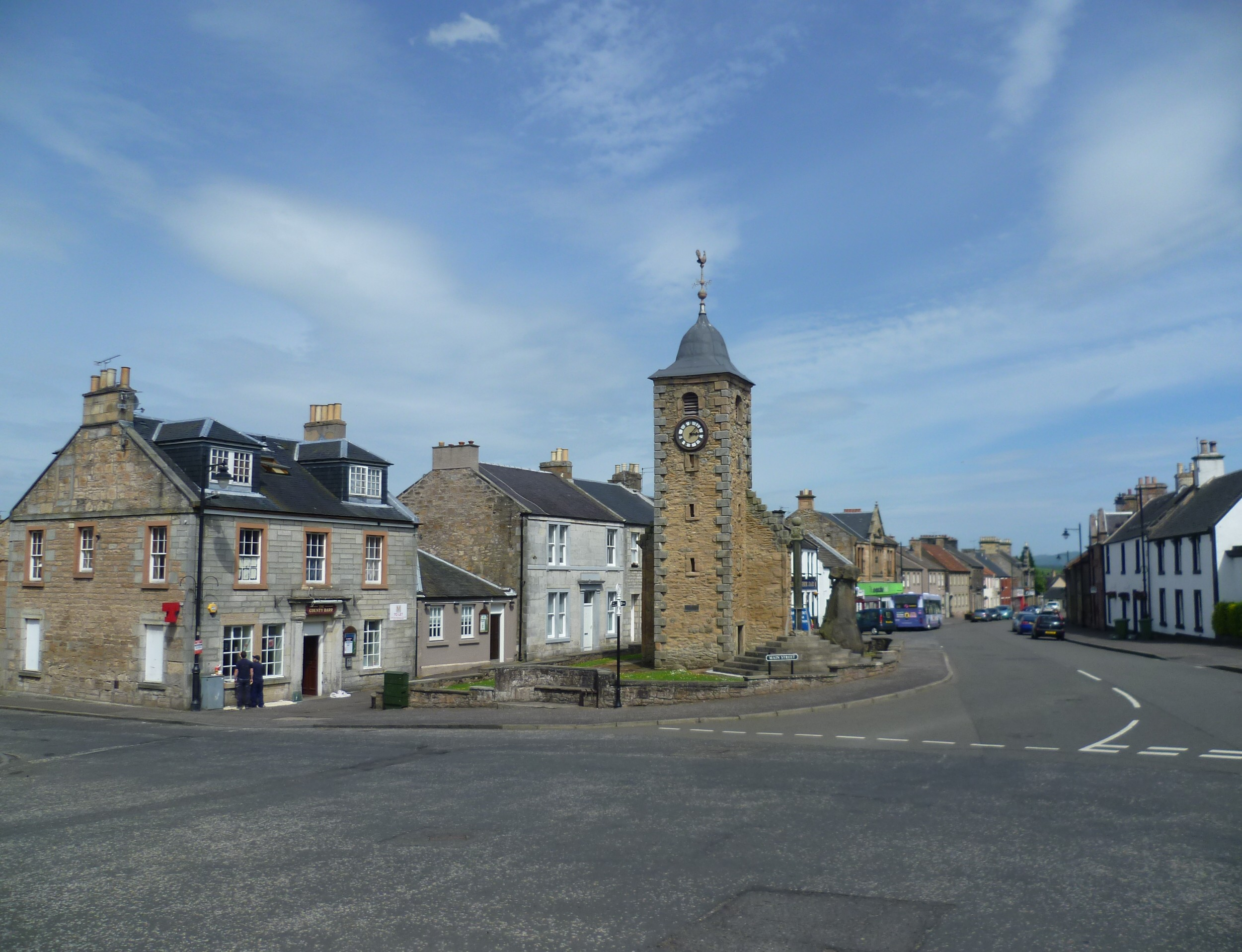
Clackmannan Main Street
