= Stirling Tolbooth =

Municipal building in Stirling, Scotland

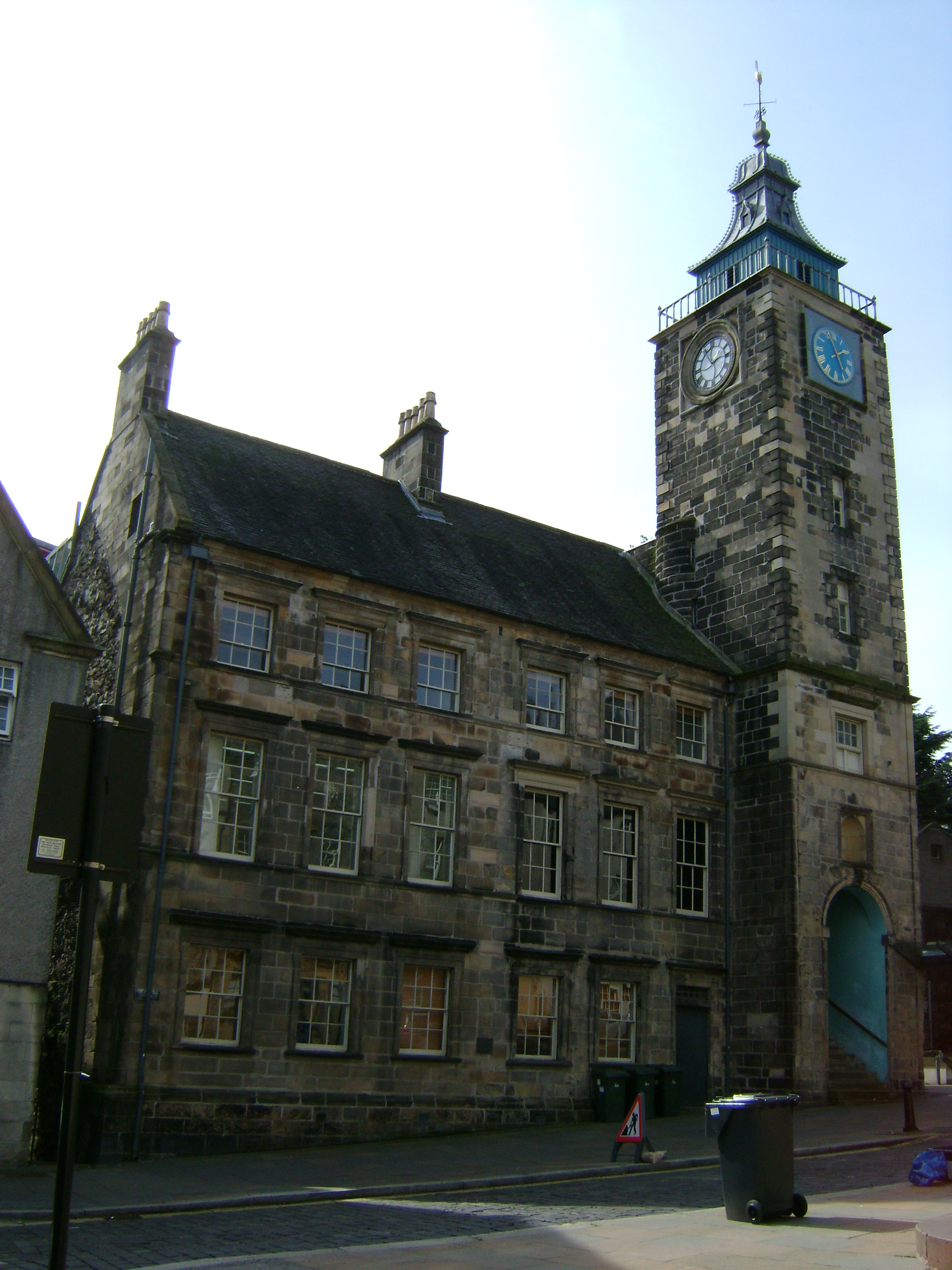
- Stirling Tolbooth

- Shown in Stirling
- 56.1206°N 3.9429°W
- Location: Broad Street, Stirling

History
- Built: 1705

Site notes
- Architect: Sir William Bruce
- Architectural style: Scottish baronial style

Listed Building – Category A
- Official name: 35-37 Broad Street, Jail Wynd and 32 St John Street, Tolbooth
- Designated: 4 November 1965
- Reference no.: LB41110

Stirling Tolbooth is a municipal building in Broad Street, Stirling, Scotland. The structure, which was the original meeting place of Stirling Burgh Council, is a Category A listed building.

== History ==
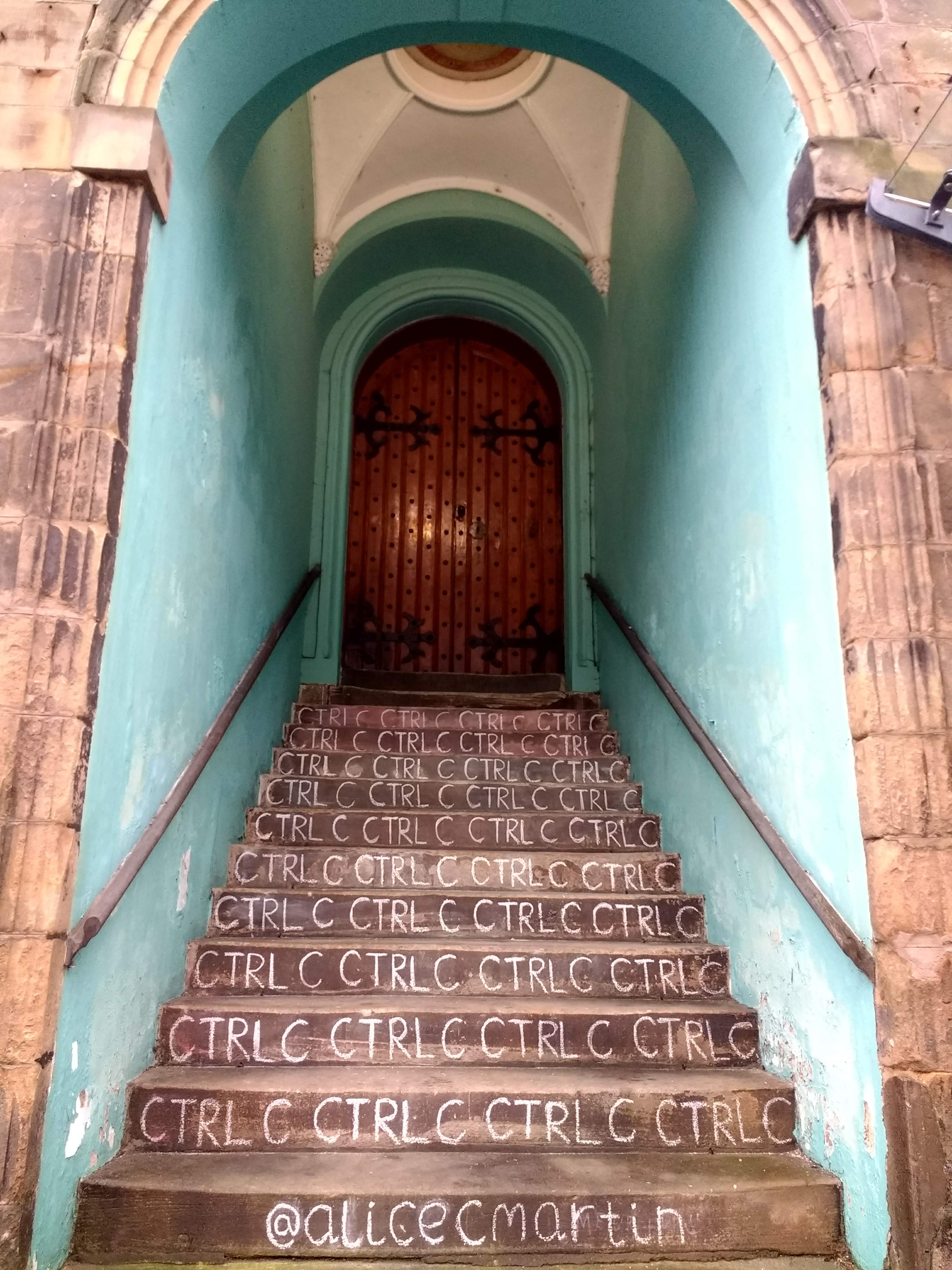
The tolbooth steps

The first building on the site was a medieval tolbooth which was completed in 1473. The tolbooth included a meeting rooms for the burgh council and legal courts. During a civil war, a Parliament was held in the Stirling tolbooth in August 1571. Replica Honours of Scotland were made for the event by Mungo Brady. After the old tolbooth became dilapidated in the late 17th century, burgh officials decided to procure a new structure: the new building was designed by Sir William Bruce in the Scottish baronial style, built by a master mason, Harry Livingstone, in ashlar stone and was completed in 1705.

The design involved an asymmetrical main frontage with a hall block of three bays and a six-stage tower facing onto Broad Street; the hall block featured a door in the right hand bay and sash windows with architraves in the other bays on three floors. The six-stage tower, which slightly projected forward, essentially survived intact from the 15th century structure although it had to be refaced. It featured a doorway on the ground floor, a niche on the first floor, sash windows on the second, third and fourth floors and clock faces on the fifth floor: it was surmounted with a belfry and a weather vane. The clock was designed and manufactured by Duncan Kerr of Falkirk. Internally, the principal rooms were the guardroom and cells on the ground floor and the courtroom, the robing room and the council chamber on the first floor. The council chamber contained some fine decorative plasterwork.

The building was extended to the east by three bays to a design by Gideon Gray in 1785, and a courthouse and prison block, designed by Richard Crichton, was built to the south of the original building and completed in 1811. John Baird and Andrew Hardie, who were leaders of the Radical forces in the Radical War, were imprisoned in the tollbooth for their role in the march on the Carron Company Ironworks in April 1820; they were tried and convicted of treason and then hanged and beheaded outside the tollbooth in September 1820.

The prisons inspector reporting on the poor state of the ground floor facilities in 1844 stated that "there has been no jail, to my knowledge, in which such a fearful state of things has existed as has been the case in the prison of Stirling." Following his report, all prisoners were transferred from the tollbooth to the new Stirling Jail in St John Street in 1847. The building ceased to be local seat of government when burgh leaders relocated to The Athenaeum in King Street in 1875, before moving on to the new Municipal Buildings in Corn Exchange Road in 1918. The courtroom was used as a venue for lectures and concerts, after a new courthouse was completed in Viewfield Place in 1876.

An extensive programme of refurbishment works, to a design by Richard Murphy Architects, to convert the building into an arts venue was completed in October 2000. The works involved the reuse of the courtroom as a performance space, the robing room as a bar and the council chamber as a restaurant. The tolbooth won 'Venue of the Year' at the Scots Trad Music Awards in 2017 and 2023.

== Current use ==
The tolbooth is owned and operated by Stirling Council. Containing a main auditorium, an exhibition space, a cafe/bar, a recording studio, a smaller performance space, and several meeting spaces, the tolbooth is the base for Stirling Council's Arts and Event Team, and used as both a performance space for touring music, comedy and theatre acts, and a hub for local community arts.

Programming and arts provision, in 2025, included Interesting Things, a multi-genre all-day festival, Sing the Greys, a tribute to the music of Frightened Rabbit, and Pump up the Jam, a songwriting and band workshop for young people.

== See also ==
- List of Category A listed buildings in Stirling
- List of listed buildings in Stirling, Stirling
