= Stirling Sheriff Court =

Judicial building in Stirling, Scotland

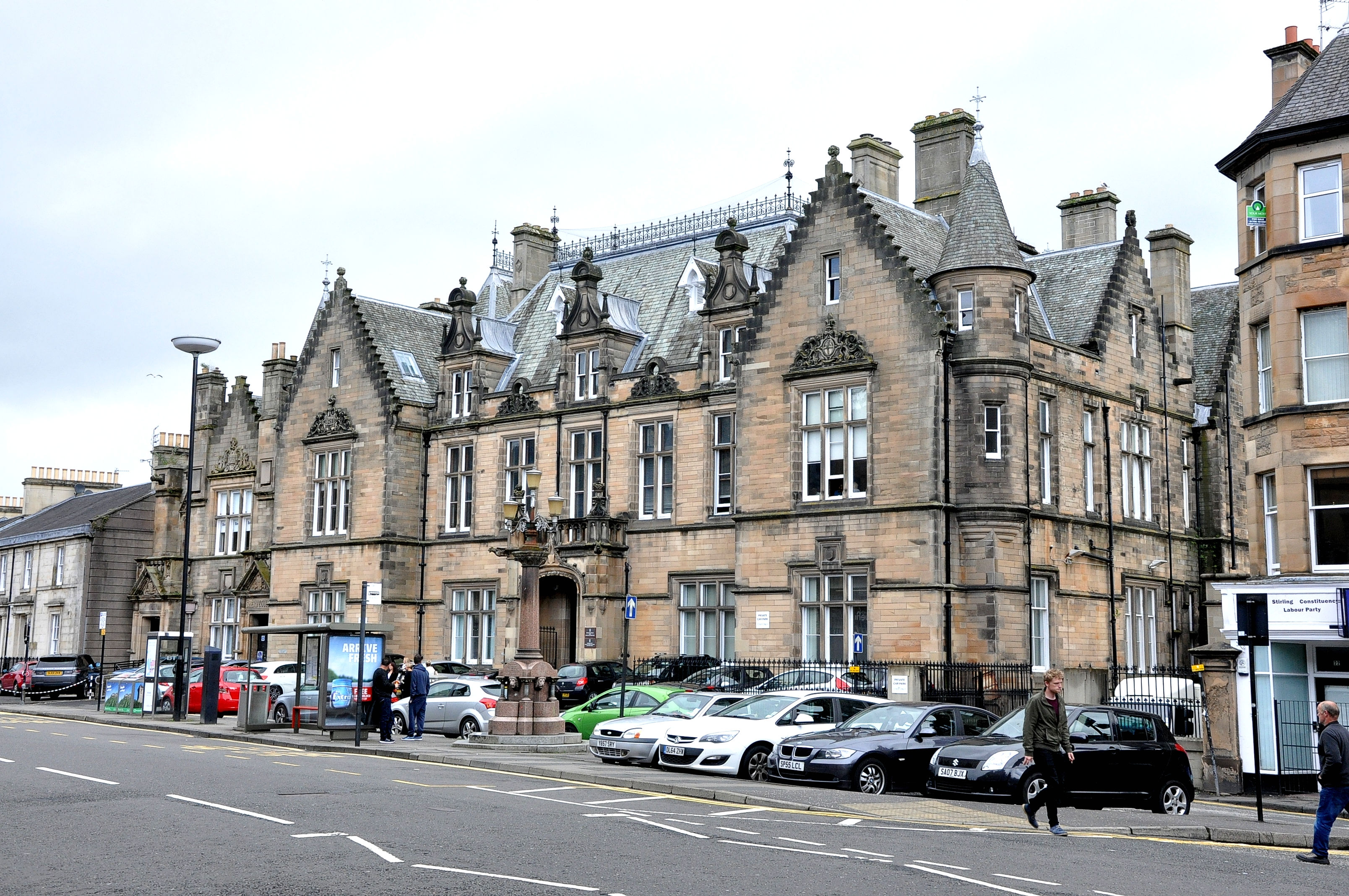
- Stirling Sheriff Court

- Shown in Stirling
- 56.1215°N 3.9381°W
- Location: Viewfield Place, Stirling

History
- Built: 1876

Site notes
- Architect: Thomas Brown
- Architectural style: Scottish baronial style

Listed Building – Category B
- Official name: Stirling Sheriff Court including boundary walls and gatepiers, and excluding later extension to east, Viewfield Place, Stirling
- Designated: 4 November 1965
- Reference no.: LB41108

Stirling Sheriff Court is a judicial building in Viewfield Place, Barnton Street, Stirling, Scotland. The building, which remains in use as a courthouse, is a Category B listed building.

== History ==
The first judicial building in Stirling was the tolbooth which, in its original form, dated from 1473. It was rebuilt in 1705, and augmented by a courthouse and prison block, designed by Richard Crichton, which was built to the south of the original building and completed in 1811. However, by the mid-19th century the old courthouse was considered inadequate and, following the implementation of the Sheriff Court Houses (Scotland) Act 1860, which laid down minimum standards for courthouses, the Commissioners of Supply decided to commission a new courthouse in Viewfield Place.

The new building was designed in the Scottish baronial style by the architectural firm of Wardrop & Reid based on an outline design by one of the firm's founders, Thomas Brown; it was built in ashlar stone and was completed in 1876. The design involved a symmetrical main frontage of seven bays facing onto Viewfield Place with the end bays projected forward; the central section of five bays featured a portico formed by an arched opening with a hood mould flanked by pilasters supporting a balustraded parapet surmounted by gargoyles and crowns. There were tri-partite windows on either side of the portico, five bi-partite windows on the first floor and three dormer windows with shaped pediments at attic level. The outer bays were fenestrated by tri-partite windows on both floors with stepped gables above. There were bartizans, which were slightly set back, at the corners of the end bays and there were elaborate carvings involving cartouches supported by scrolls above the second and fourth bays of the centre section and also above the end bays. Internally, the principal room was a large courtroom on the first floor. A wooden canopy surmounted by a carved Royal coat of arms was installed above the judge's chair.

A drinking fountain, carved from polished pink granite, was placed outside the courthouse in 1887.

Stirlingshire County Council was established in 1890 and held its first meeting on 22 May 1890 at the sheriff court, which was also known as "County Buildings" at the time. The county council continued to meet there until 1930 and had some of its offices in the building. In 1930 the county council's functions were substantially expanded under the Local Government (Scotland) Act 1929, taking over the functions of the abolished Stirlingshire Education Authority. The education authority had bought the former Royal Infirmary building at 33 Spittal Street in 1929 to use as its headquarters. The county council moved its meeting place to Spittal Street in 1930, but still needed more office space for its staff. In 1931 the council acquired a house called Viewforth on Pitt Terrace, which was subsequently extended and served as the county council's headquarters until its abolition in 1975.

The sheriff court was extended to the north in a similar style to create a police station in 1912 and was extended to the rear in a modernist style to create additional courtroom space in the 1970s. It continued to serve a judicial function, being used for hearings of the sheriff's court and, on one day a month, for hearings of the justice of the peace court into the 21st century.

== See also ==
- List of listed buildings in Stirling, Stirling
