= Statue of Henry Campbell-Bannerman =

Monument in Stirling, Scotland

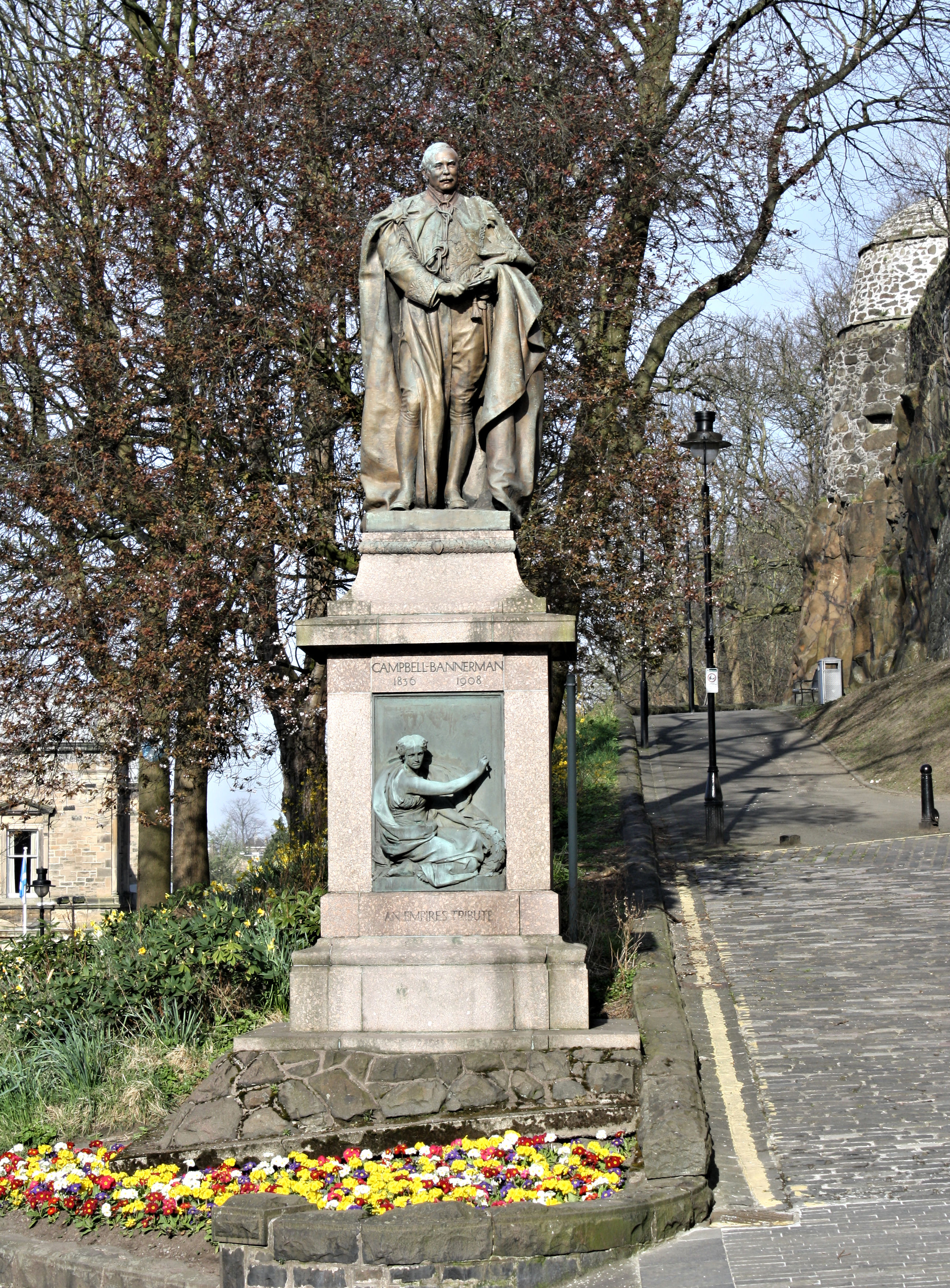
- Artist: Paul Raphael Montford
- Year: 1913
- Medium: Bronze
- Location: Corn Exchange Road, Stirling

A statue of Henry Campbell-Bannerman by Paul Raphael Montford stands in Stirling, Scotland. Erected in 1913, it depicts Henry Campbell-Bannerman, the former Prime Minister of the United Kingdom and Liberal Member of Parliament for Stirling Burghs. It is located on Corn Exchange Road and is close to Stirling railway station. Historic Environment Scotland notes the statue as a listed building.

== See also ==
- List of listed buildings in Stirling, Stirling
