= Old Viewforth =

Municipal building in Stirling, Scotland

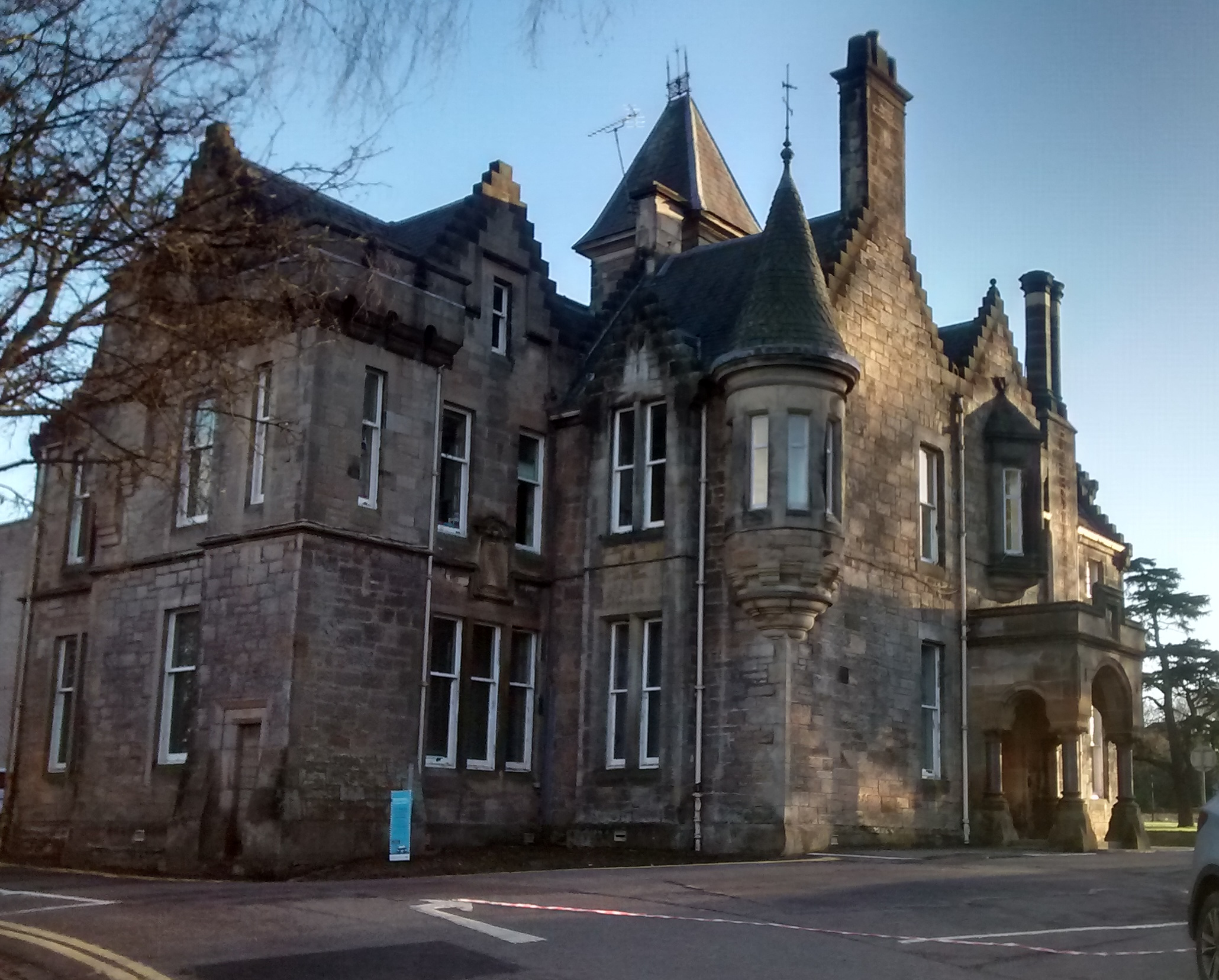
- The earliest part of Old Viewforth

- Shown in Stirling
- 56.1134°N 3.9370°W
- Location: Stirling

History
- Built: 1855

Site notes
- Architect(s): J W Hay and James Miller
- Architectural style: Scottish baronial style

Listed Building – Category B
- Designated: 8 January 2002
- Reference no.: LB48323

Old Viewforth is a municipal facility on Pitt Terrace in Stirling, Scotland. The facility, which is the headquarters of Stirling Council, is a Category B listed building.

== History ==
The first house on the site, which was known as "Viewforth" was commissioned by the Rev John McMillan, Moderator of the Reformed Presbyterian Church of Scotland, in 1787. The building was acquired by Peter Drummond, a seed merchant, who demolished the old house in 1853. The earliest part of the current building, which was designed by John Hay in the Scottish baronial style, was built for Drummond and completed in 1855. The design involved an asymmetrical main frontage with four bays facing St Ninian's Road; it featured a stone porch, supported by polished columns, on the ground floor with coat of arms and finial above; there was a narrow oriel window on the first floor and a bartizan on the left corner. The house was remodelled in 1871. It was requisitioned by the government during the First World War and subsequently used as offices for various government departments until 1931, when it was purchased by Stirlingshire County Council for £5,250. (Note: Stirlingshire County Council, formed in 1890, had previously been based at County Buildings in Barnton Street, a structure which was completed in 1875.)

A large extension, extending the building eastwards to a design by James Miller in an art deco style in order the create additional administrative facilities for the county council, was added in 1937. The design for the extension involved an asymmetrical main frontage with eighteen bays facing south; the central section of three sections featured a doorway with an iron surround on the ground floor flanked by windows and full-height pilasters with a coat of arms above; there were windows on the first floor with a block pediment and frieze above. Statues of William Wallace and Robert the Bruce were erected on either side of the doorway. The principal room was the council chamber which jutted out to the north of the extension. The extension cost £33,000 and was officially opened on 5 May 1937.

The complex became the headquarters for the wider Central Regional Council when it was created in May 1975. Following the reorganisation under the Local Government etc (Scotland) Act 1994, which saw the abolition of the district councils in the area, the building became the headquarters of the new Stirling Council in 1996.

A modern building known as "New Viewforth", designed in the Brutalist style, was constructed to the south of Old Viewforth and officially opened on 29 February 1972 but, after it became apparent that refurbishment would be uneconomic, it was demolished in 2014. In February 2020 the council announced that, although the council's main building at Old Viewforth was being retained, a section of land on the east of the site would be marketed for sale as part of plans for the Viewforth Link Road.

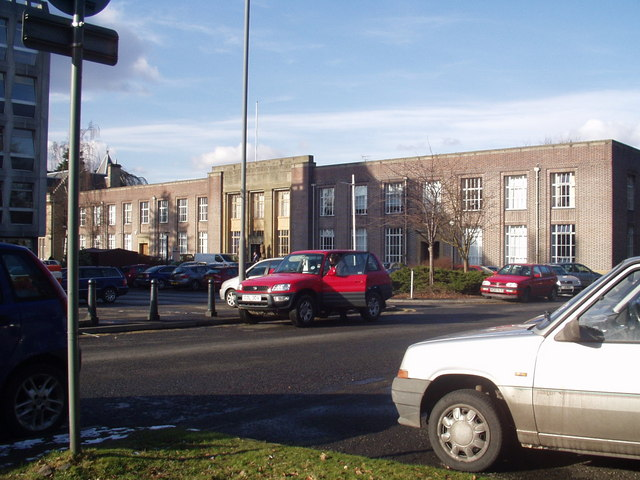
Extension to the building by James Miller completed in 1937

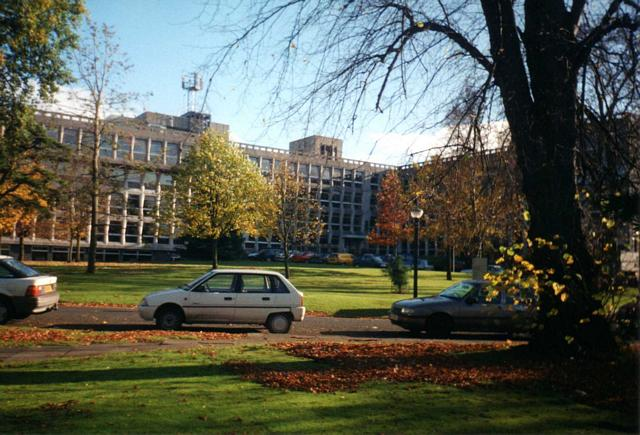
"New Viewforth", demolished in 2014

== See also ==
- List of listed buildings in Stirling, Stirling
