= Paul Raphael Montford =

English-born sculptor

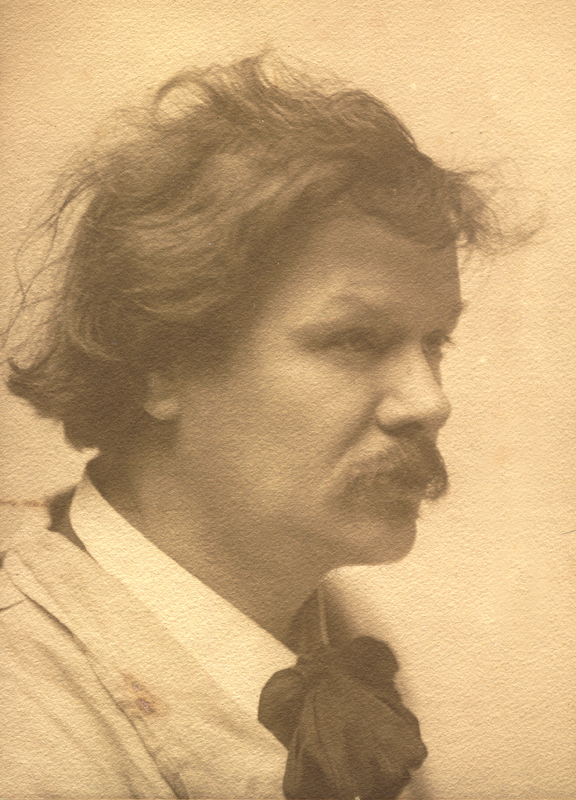
- Montford c. 1900. Photographer unknown.
- Born: Paul Raphael Montford; 1 November 1868; Kentish Town, London, United Kingdom
- Died: 15 January 1938 (aged 69); Richmond, Victoria, Australia
- Education: Royal Academy Schools
- Occupation: Sculptor
- Spouse: Marian Alice Dibdin (m. 1912)
- Father: Horace Montford

Paul Raphael Montford (1 November 1868 – 15 January 1938) was an English-born sculptor, also active in Australia; winner of the gold medal of the Royal Society of British Sculptors in 1934.

== Early life ==
Montford was born in Kentish Town, London, the son of Horace Montford, a sculptor, and his wife Sarah Elizabeth, née Lewis. Montford married Marian Alice Dibdin (daughter of W. J. Dibdin) a capable oil-painter, on 11 September 1912.

== Career ==
Sculpting commissions in England were scarce after World War I, so Montford decided to go to Australia in 1923 believing the light would be favourable to sculpture. He had difficulty in getting commissions and taught at the Gordon Technical College in Geelong, Victoria, in July 1924 exhibited at the Geelong Art Gallery, and became president of the Victorian Artists' Society in 1930.

In Australia, there are approximately seventy works by Montford. He provided a model from which a portrait bust of Socrates was carved by Victor Wager in 1932, for the University of Western Australia.

Montford was the subject for his wife, Marion's, winning entry in the 1931 Archibald Prize.

In 1937 Montford joined Robert Menzies' anti-modernist organisation, the Australian Academy of Art as a foundation member, but died before its first exhibition.

=== Notable works ===
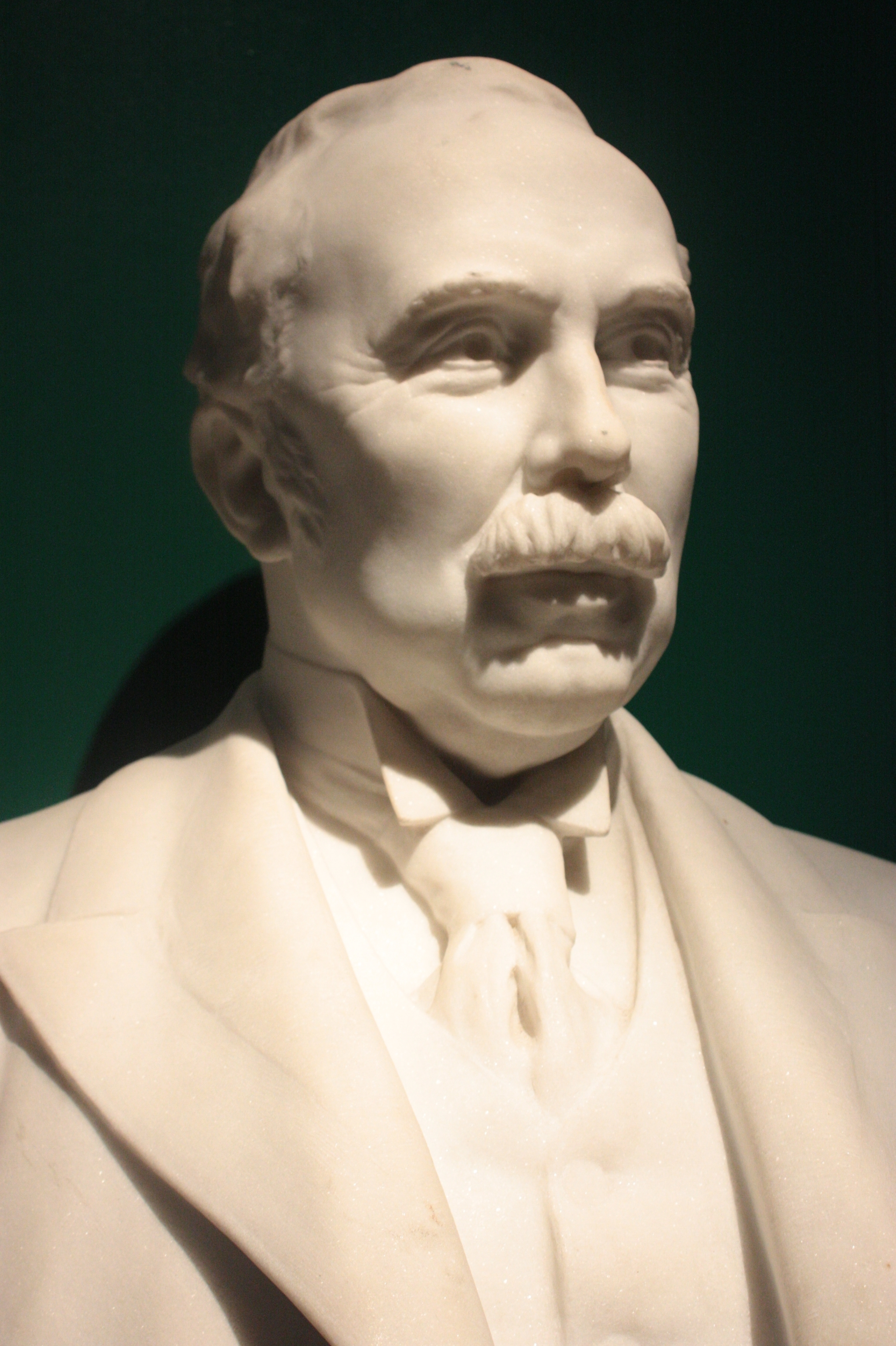
Bust (1913) of Henry Campbell-Bannerman in Stirling Smith Art Gallery and Museum

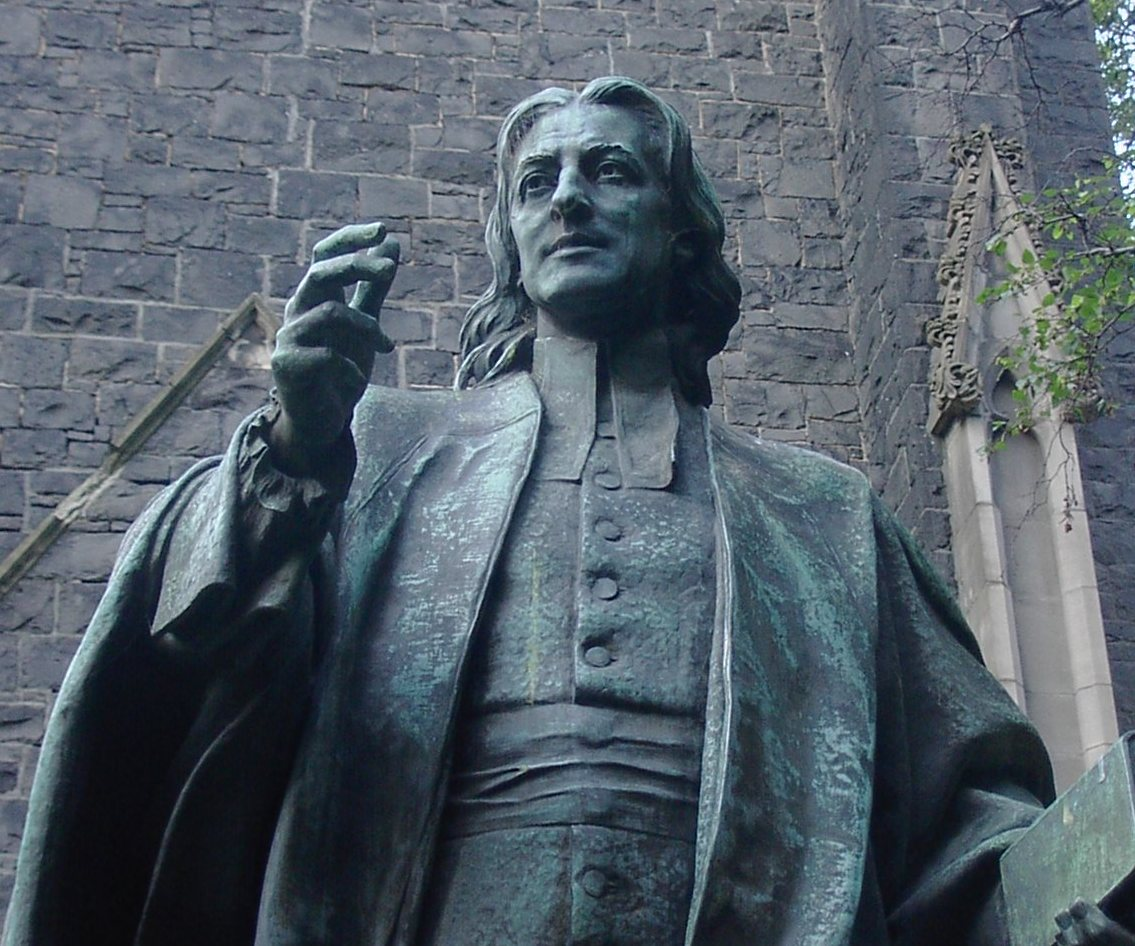
A bronze statue (1935) of John Wesley, located outside the Wesley Church, Melbourne

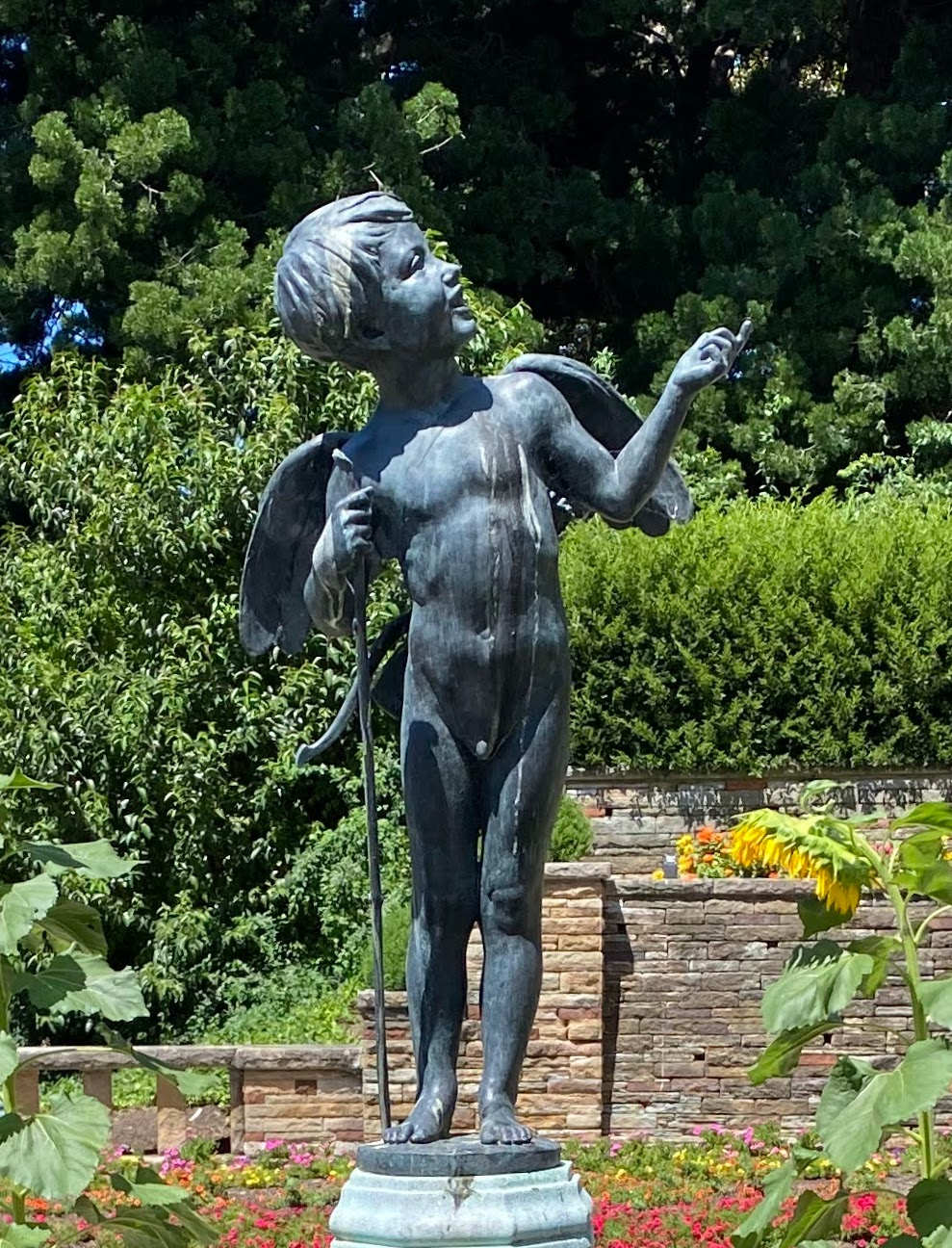
Eros, bronze statue (1938), Royal Botanic Gardens Sydney

Montfont was responsible for the design of:

Architectural sculptures

- 1892 – Battersea Town Hall
- 1904 – Commerce and Industry, Cardiff Crown Court
- 1904 – The Flow, Poetry and Music, and The Sea Receiving the Severn, Cardiff City Hall
- 1908 – Victory freize, King Charles Street archway, Whitehall, London
- 1914 – Kelvinbridge, Glasgow
- 1920 – Alfred Beit, Sir Julius Wernher, and four allegorical figures, Royal School of Mines, London
- 1921 – Croydon Cenotaph, comprising two bronze statues designed by Montford, located in Croydon, England
- n.d. – William Caxton, and George Heriot, Exhibition Road façade of the Victoria and Albert Museum, London

Memorial sculptures (not attached to buildings or structures)

- 1913 – Henry Campbell-Bannerman, bronze bust, located in Stirling, Scotland
- 1927 – Sir Ross Macpherson Smith, located in Creswell Gardens, Adelaide
- 1928 – Charles Norman Morrison, located at the Geelong College
- 1929 – William Chaffey, located in Mildura
- 1930 – The Court Favourite, located in Flagstaff Gardens, Melbourne
- 1932 – Adam Lindsay Gordon, located outside Parliament House, Melbourne
- 1932 – Carlo Catani, bronze bust at the base of a clocktower, also dedicated in Catani's honour, but not designed by Montford, located in St Kilda
- 1935 – John Wesley, located outside the Wesley Church, Melbourne
- 1935 – Anne Daly (also known as Mother Mary Berchmans), bronze bust, located at the St Vincent's Hospital, Fitzroy
- 1937 – George Higinbotham, located outside Treasury Buildings, East Melbourne
- 1938 – Eros, bronze statue in the fountain in the Memorial Garden to Pioneers, the Garden Palace dome, Royal Botanic Gardens Sydney

Other sculptures

- – A Girl Spinning
- – Elf-Babes
- – The Bather
- – A Favourite of the Gods
- – Center panel of memorial for the bandsmen who went down with the "Titanic"
- – Water-Nymph
