= Stirling Arcade =

Shopping arcade in Stirling, Scotland

Coordinates: 56°7′7.32″N 3°56′14.21″W

Stirling Arcade is a shopping arcade in Stirling, Scotland. Built between 1879 and 1882, it houses the former Alhambra Theatre and Music Hall.

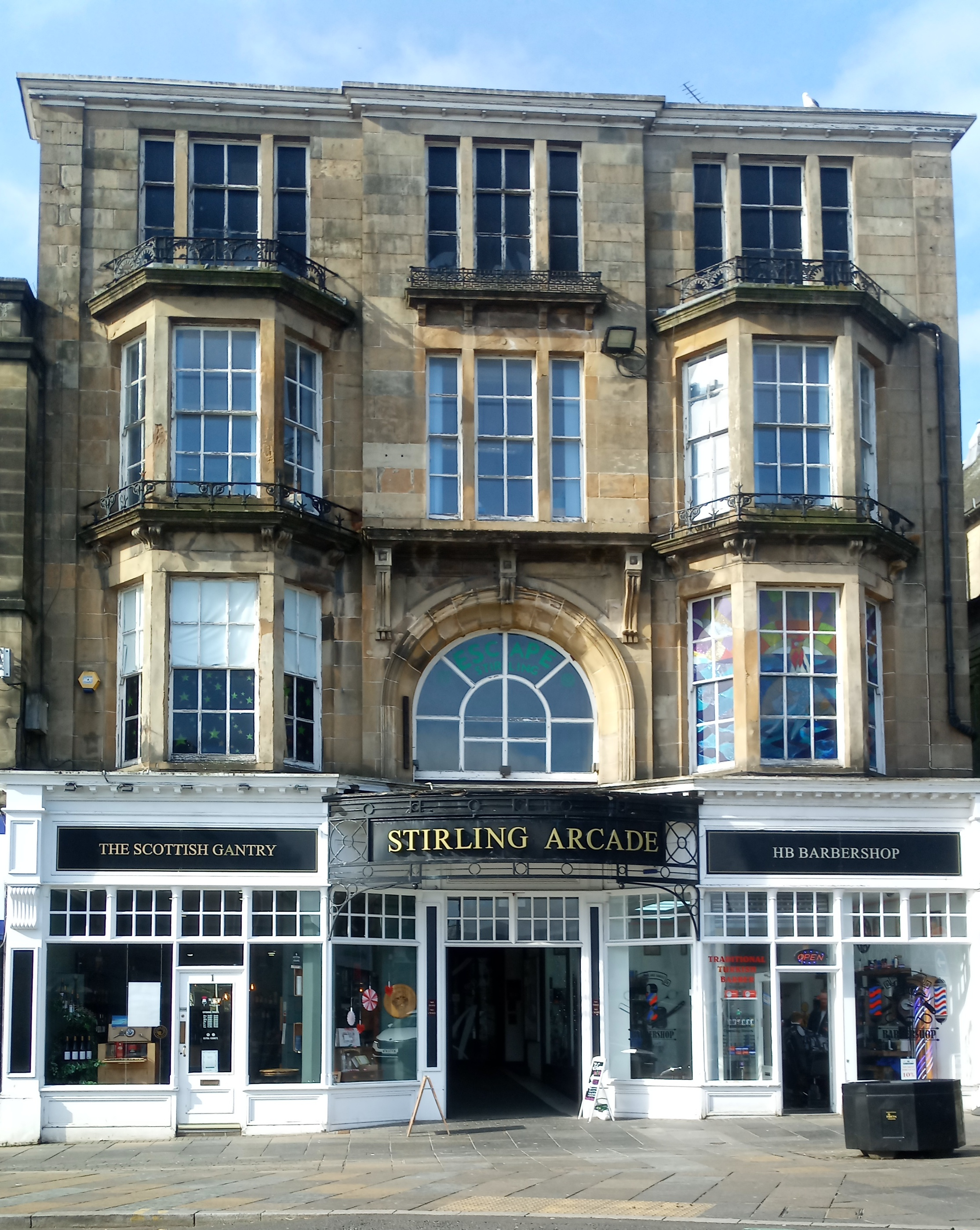
Entrance of Stirling Arcade on Murray Place

The Arcade was designed by John McLean and opened in 1882. It was originally known as Crawford's Arcade, after its developer, the merchant William Crawford, who had it built at a cost of £20,000.

The shop-lined covered arcade street descends from the former Temperance Hotel on King Street to the Douglas Hotel on Murray Place, by way of a dog-leg street with a central square and the Alhambra Theatre, which served variously as a music hall and cinema, before closing in 1939. It was repurposed as a furniture showroom for Thomas Menzies Ltd. in 1964 but has subsequently become disused.

Stirling Arcade was designated as a Category B listed building in 1976.
