= List of Phi Beta Sigma members =

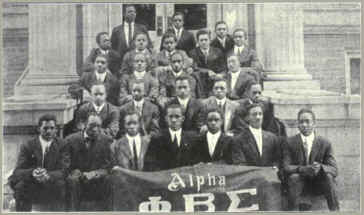
Phi Beta Sigma founders: A. Langston Taylor, (first row, center), Leonard F. Morse (first row; third from right) and Charles I. Brown (first row; third from left) with charter members of Alpha chapter in 1914

Phi Beta Sigma is a historically African American fraternity that was founded at Howard University in Washington, D.C. in 1914. The fraternity's membership includes four African presidents; three governors; nine congressmen; the first black Rhodes Scholar; numerous NFL football, NBA basketball, and MLB baseball players; ten college and university presidents; and sixteen Olympians. Various buildings and schools have been named after Sigma men such as George Washington Carver, James Weldon Johnson, and Robert Russa Moton.

The following list includes initiated and honorary Phi Beta Sigma members. A chapter name ending in "Sigma" denotes a graduate chapter.

== Academia and education ==
Name	Original chapter	Notability	Ref.
William Augustus Bell	Sigma	2nd and 9th president of Miles College; Helped guide the school from the brink of bankruptcy following the Great Depression	
George Washington Carver	Gamma Sigma	professor at Tuskegee Institute; known for research into and promotion of peanuts and sweet potatoes	
Matthew W. Dogan	Gamma Psi	7th president of Wiley College	
Israel Dunn Jr.	Xi	12th president of Arkansas Baptist College	
Dudley Flood	Eta Sigma	administrator in the North Carolina Department of Public Instruction, instrumental in desegregating North Carolina's schools	
Thomas J. Gibson	Beta Omicron Sigma	Chancellor of University of Wisconsin–Stevens Point and the University of Wisconsin–Milwaukee	
Willie Gilchrist	Alpha Upsilon Sigma	4th Chancellor of Elizabeth City State University	
Edison O. Jackson	Alpha	6th President of Bethune-Cookman University (2012-2017) and Medgar Evers College (1989-2009)	
Ralph Waldo Emerson Jones		2nd President of Grambling State University and founder/head coach of the Grambling State Tigers baseball team (1936-1977); College Baseball Hall of Fame Grambling named its baseball field after him and fellow coach Wilbert Ellis	
Robert J. Jones	Alpha Pi	34th president of the University of Washington (current), 10th Chancellor of University of Illinois at Urbana-Champaign (2016-2025), and 19th president of the State University of New York at Albany (2013-2016)	
Wayne D. Lewis Jr.	Omicron Phi	6th president of Houghton University, first African American president of the institution	
Sidney A. McPhee	Delta Theta	10th President of Middle Tennessee State University (2001-2026)	
Horace Mitchell	Kappa Sigma	4th President of California State University, Bakersfield (2004-2018)	
Parlett Moore		2nd President of Coppin State University; Founded the Sigma Beta Club in 1950, 20th Past International President from 1971-1973	
Leonard F. Morse	Alpha	Founder of Phi Beta Sigma, President of Edward Waters College	
Robert Russa Moton	Gamma Sigma	2nd president of Tuskegee University (1915-1935)	
Mark Anthony Neal	Delta Zeta Sigma	Professor of Black popular culture at Duke University	
G. Leon Netterville	Rho	president of Southern University	
Charles Ogletree	Honorary	Professor at Harvard Law School and founder of the Charles Hamilton Houston Institute for Race and Justice	
Rod Paige	Alpha Beta	7th United States Secretary of Education; superintendent of the Houston Independent School District; head football coach at Jackson State University and Texas Southern University	
Lawrence D. Reddick	Alpha Gamma	Historian and professor; wrote the first biography of Martin Luther King Jr. during the Montgomery bus boycott, Crusader without Violence (1959)	
Lamont O. Repollet	Chi Sigma	18th president of Kean University, Commissioner of Education of New Jersey; superintendent of the Asbury Park School District	
Kevin D. Rome	Chi	16th president of Fisk University and Lincoln University	
W. Sherman Savage	Alpha	Professor of history at Lincoln University	
David Swinton	Beta Chi Sigma	13th president of Benedict College	
Thomas Wyatt Turner	Alpha	Department head and professor of botany at Hampton Institute; professor at Howard University and Cornell University	
Louis Westerfield	Rho	First African American Dean of the Loyola University New Orleans School of Law and University of Mississippi School of Law	

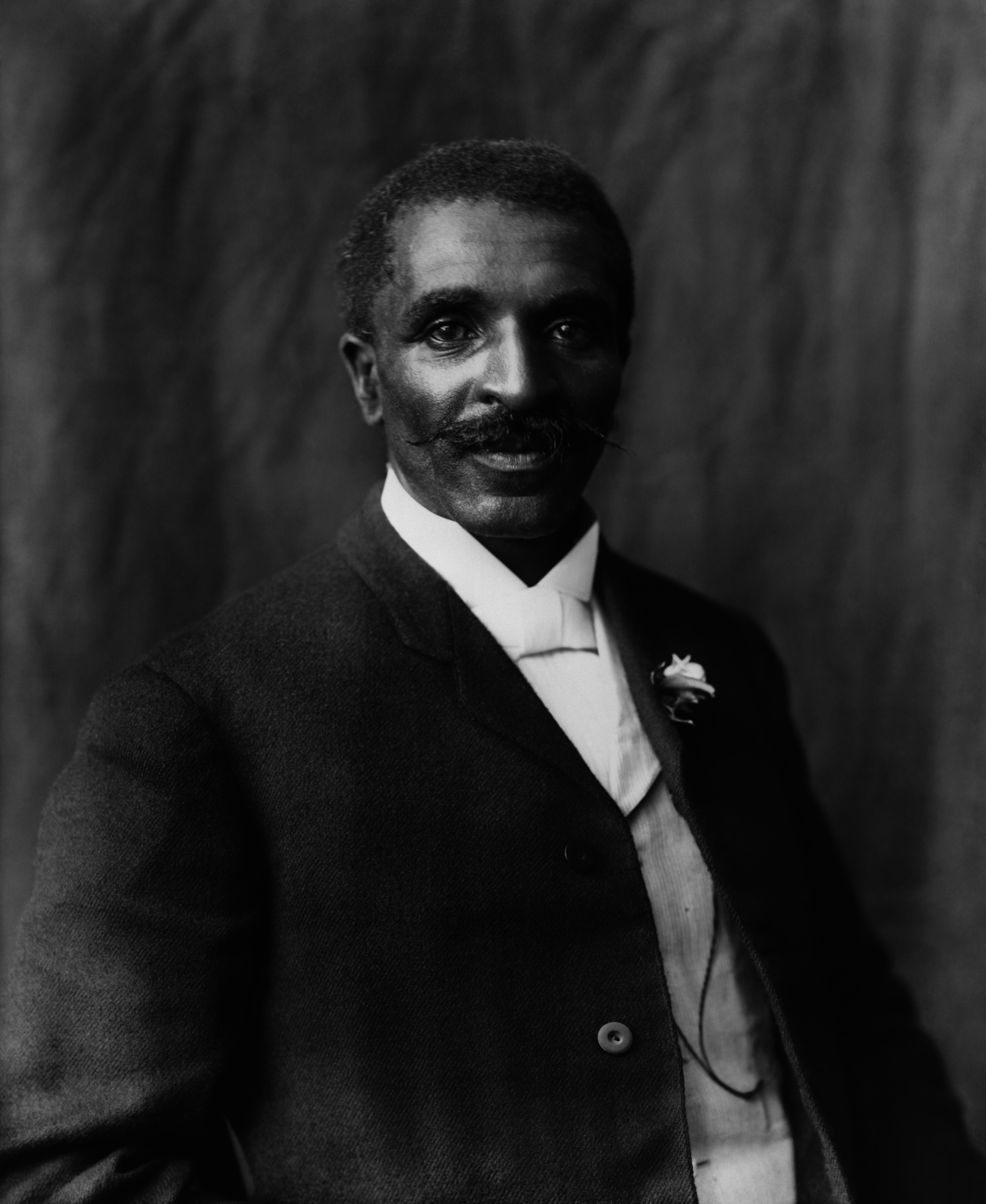
Dr. George Washington Carver

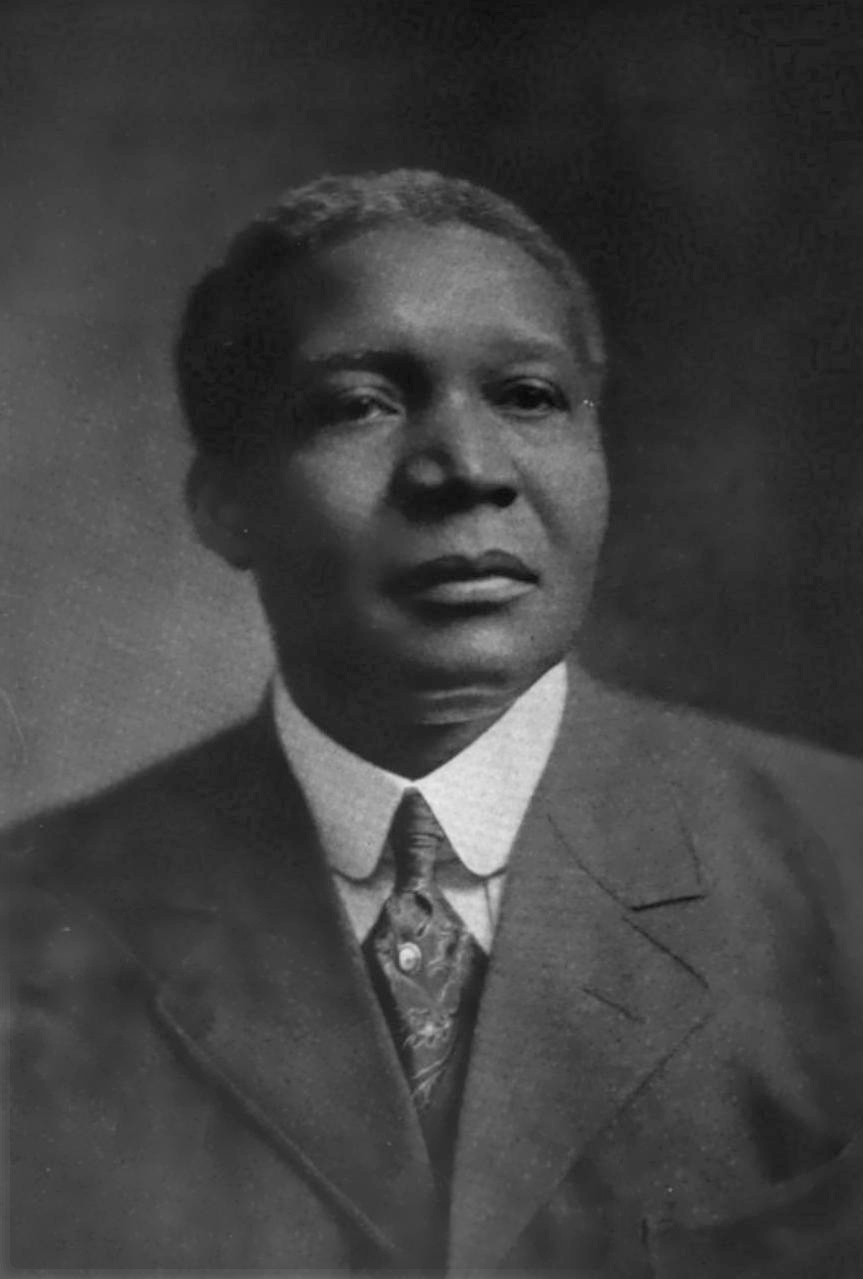
Robert Russa Moton

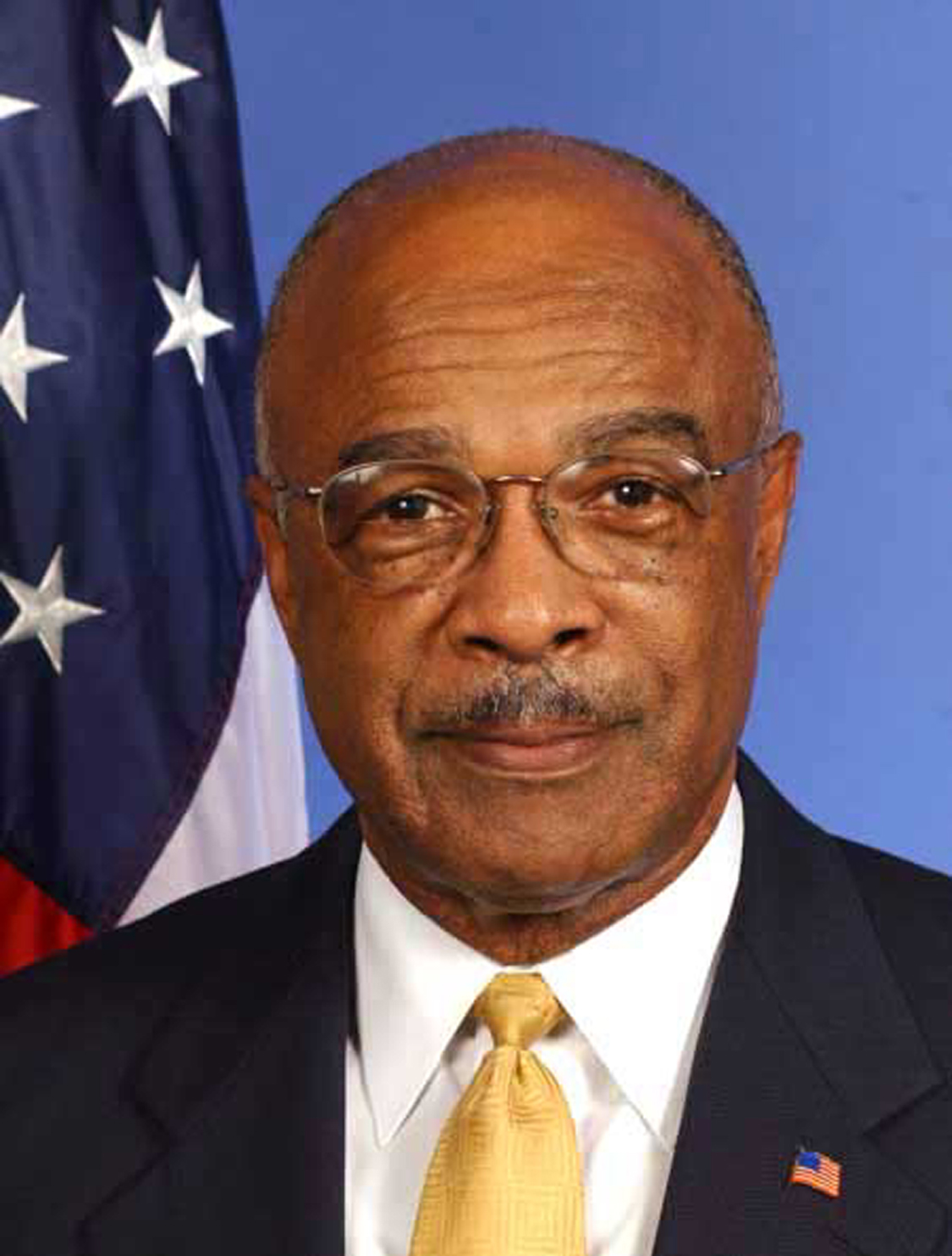
Dr. Rod Paige

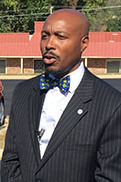
Kevin D. Rome

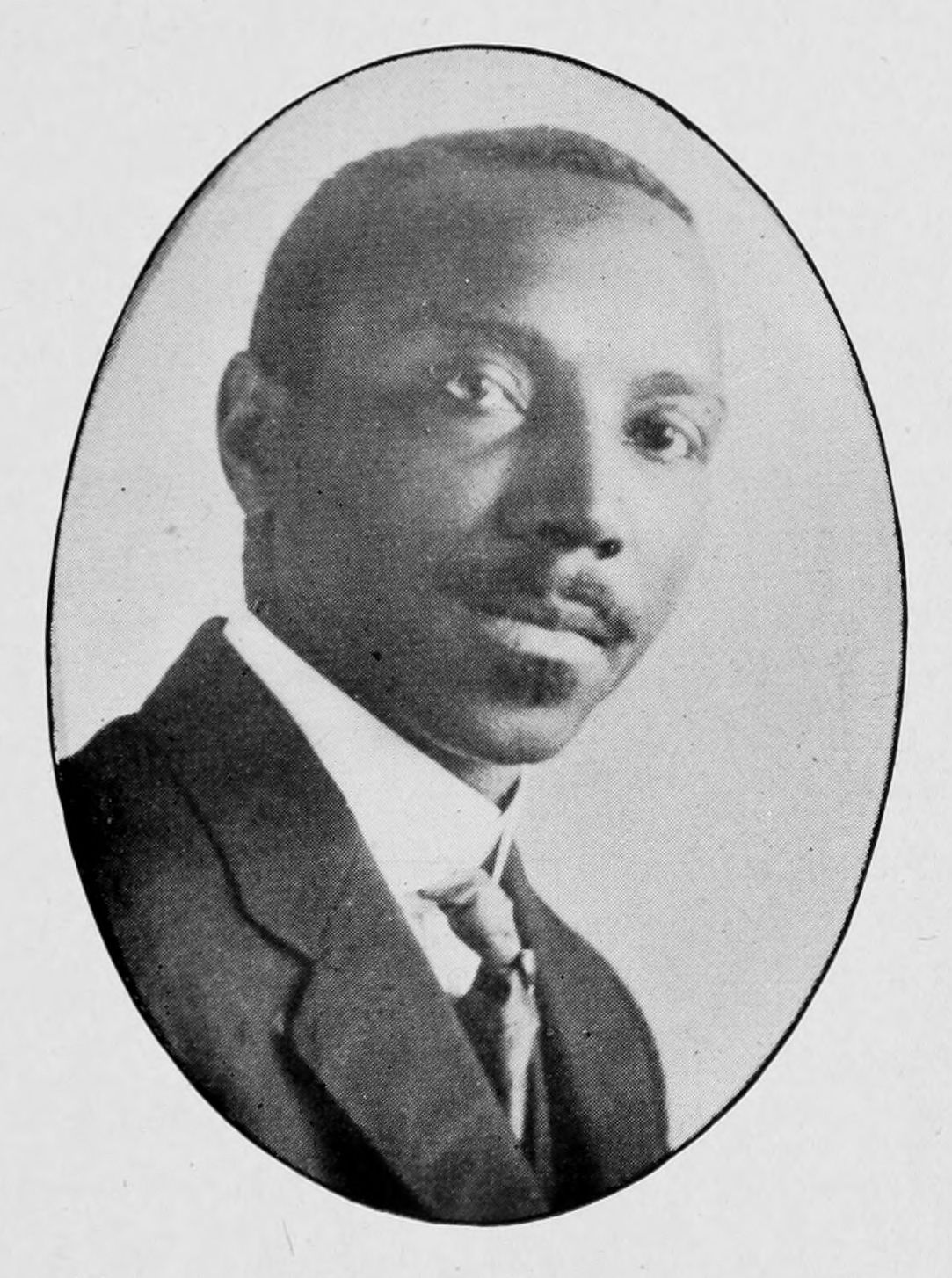
Thomas Wyatt Turner

== Activists ==
Name	Original chapter	Notability	Ref.
John E. T. Camper	Alpha	Physician and Civil Rights activist; Helped organize the 1942 March on Annapolis to unite diverse organizations against systemic police violence	
Benjamin Chavis	Honorary	President and CEO of the National Newspaper Publishers Association; national director of the Million Man March, executive director and CEO of the NAACP, leader of the Wilmington Ten	
James Forman		Civil Rights leader active in the Student Nonviolent Coordinating Committee and the Black Panther Party	
Howard Fuller	Honorary	Civil Rights activist, education reform advocate, and academic	
Devon Henry	Delta Zeta	Contractor and activist, best known for the removal of over 20 Confederate monuments across the southeastern U.S.	
Lafayette M. Hershaw	Alpha	a Founder of the Niagara movement, the forerunner of the NAACP	
Von D. Mizell	Chi	Physician and Civil Rights activist; helped establish Provident Hospital in Fort Lauderdale, which served black patients denied access from white hospitals	
Huey P. Newton	Beta Tau	Co-founder of the Black Panther Party	
A. Philip Randolph	Iota Sigma	Founder of the Brotherhood of Sleeping Car Porters, primary organizer of the March on Washington for Jobs and Freedom	
Terrence Roberts	Honorary	One of the Little Rock Nine; first black students ever to attend classes at Little Rock Central High School in 1957	
Al Sharpton	Honorary	Civil rights activist, Baptist minister, host of radio show Keepin It Real with Al Sharpton, founder of National Action Network, candidate for the 2004 U.S. Presidential election	
A. Langston Taylor	Alpha	Civil rights and labor activist; national president of the United Domestic Workers of America, the African Aid Society, and the American Industrial League; Phi Beta Sigma founder	
Hosea Williams	Zeta	Civil rights activist	
Lennox Yearwood	Gamma Lambda	President and CEO of the Hip Hop Caucus	

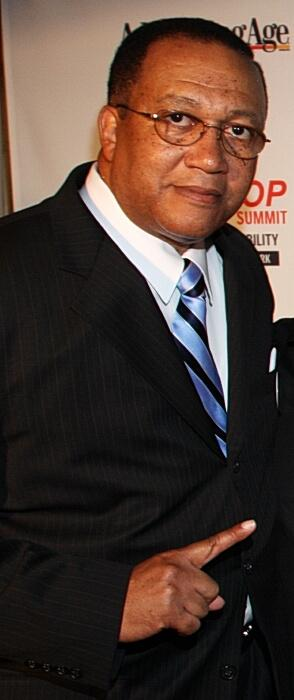
Benjamin Chavis

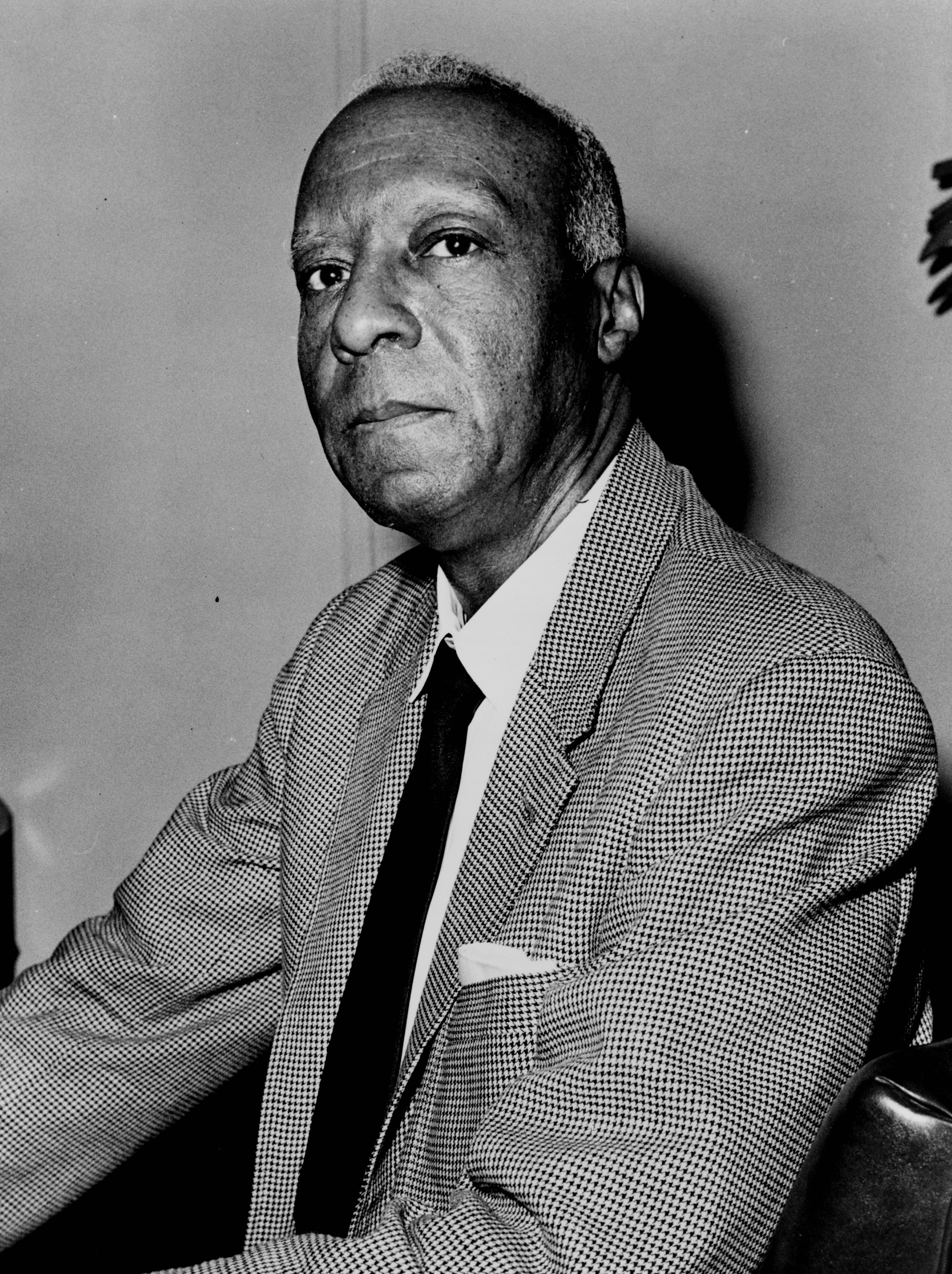
A. Philip Randolph

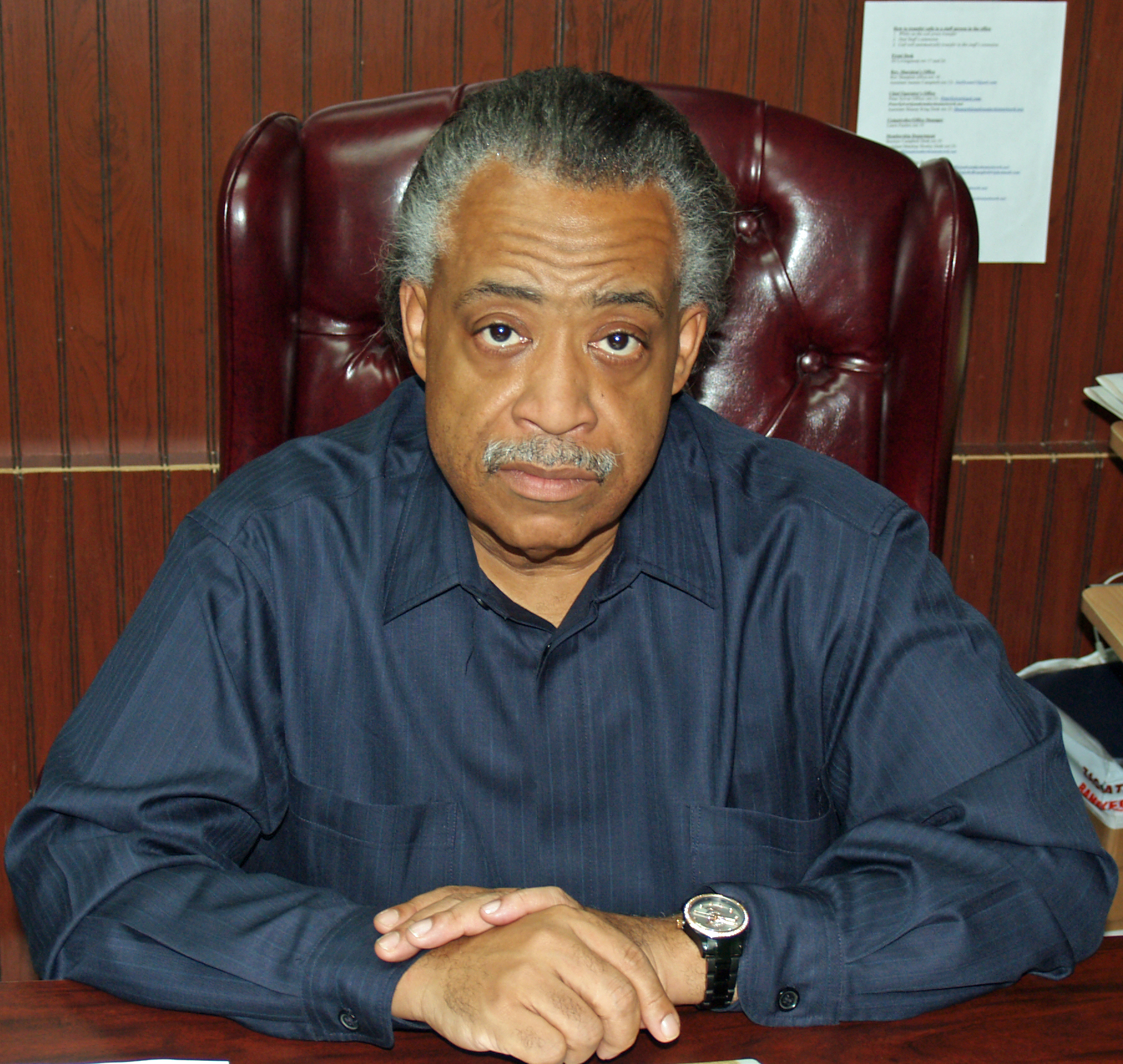
Al Sharpton

== Art and architecture ==
Name	Original chapter	Notability	Ref.
Ed Dwight	Honorary	Sculptor, author, and test pilot	
Samuel Plato	Epsilon Beta Sigma	Architect, first African American to be awarded a U.S. post office contract; designer of National Register of Historic Places buildings	

== Business ==
Name	Original chapter	Notability	Ref.
John Hope Bryant	Honorary	founder, chairman, and CEO of Operation HOPE	
Joe Dudley	Honorary	President and CEO of Dudley Hair Care Products	
Albon Holsey		Businessman and executive secretary of the National Negro Business League	
Kase Lukman Lawal	Alpha Beta Sigma	CEO of CAMAC International Corporation and Erin Energy Corporation	
R. Donahue Peebles	Honorary	Founder, chairman, and CEO of the Peebles Corporation	
Jerome Ringo	Honorary	Founder of the renewable energy developer Zoetic Global	
Herman J. Russell	Lambda Sigma	Founder and CEO of H.J. Russell & Company Construction	

== Entertainment ==
Name	Original chapter	Notability	Ref.
Omowale Akintunde	Gamma Beta	Emmy Award winner for An Inaugural Ride to Freedom (2010)	
Flex Alexander	Epsilon Lambda Sigma	Comedian and actor	
King Bach	Mu Epsilon	Actor, stand-up comedian, and Vine star	
Warren Ballentine	Iota Nu Sigma	Host of the Warren Ballentine Show and Court Radio	
Qasim Basir	Gamma Iota	Actor, director, producer	
Harry Belafonte	Honorary	Singer, songwriter, actor, and social activist EGOT honoree: 3x Grammy Award, Emmy Award, Tony Award, and Jean Hersholt Humanitarian Award winner Order of Merit (Jamaica), Kennedy Center Honors, National Medal of Arts, Rock and Roll Hall of Fame	
Wayne Brady	Honorary	Comedian, actor, and singer; five-time Emmy Award winner	
J Anthony Brown	Eta Beta Sigma	Comedian and actor; Peabody Award and NAACP Image Award winner	
Kurt Carr	Zeta Lambda	Gospel recording artist	
Leon "Ndugu" Chancler	Honorary	Jazz-funk drummer, percussionist, studio musician, composer, and producer	
Bootsy Collins	Honorary	Bass player, singer, and songwriter with Parliament-Funkadelic; Rock and Roll Hall of Fame	
Combat Jack	Kappa Xi	Radio host and attorney	
William Stanford Davis	Honorary	Actor best known for Abbott Elementary; NAACP Image Award winner	
Dem Boyz Step Team	Xi Pi, Lambda Chi, and Alpha Nu Alpha	Step performers, actors, musicians; featured in the films Stomp the Yard and How She Move	
Bill Duke	Honorary	Actor, director, and producer dubbed the "Godfather of African American Cinema"	
Larry Dunn	Honorary	Keyboardist, producer, songwriter, musical director, and original member of Earth, Wind & Fire; Rock and Roll Hall of Fame	
Timon Kyle Durrett	Alpha Zeta	Actor known for Single Ladies and Tyler Perry's Daddy's Little Girls	
Emcee N.I.C.E.	Alpha Alpha Epsilon Sigma	Christian hip hop recording artist	
Melvin Franklin	Upsilon Sigma	Member of The Temptations; National Rhythm & Blues Hall of Fame	
Richard Gant	Beta Tau	Actor and director	
Fred Hammond	Honorary	Gospel singer, bass guitar player, and record producer; Grammy Award winner	
Everette Harp	Zeta Beta	Jazz saxophonist	
Terrence Howard	Honorary	Actor; NAACP Image Award and Screen Actors Guild Award winner	
Jordan Howlett	Gamma Rho Nu	Social media personality	
Reginald Hudlin	Honorary	Film director, writer, actor, and producer	
Javon Johnson	Alpha Lambda Sigma	Actor known for Tyler Perry's The Oval; playwright	
Ralph Johnson	Honorary	Drummer and singer with Earth, Wind & Fire; Rock and Roll Hall of Fame and Kennedy Center Honors	
Bobby Jones	Zeta Alpha	Gospel music singer and television host; Grammy Award, Grammy Lifetime Achievement Award, and Gospel Music Hall of Fame	
Jay King	Honorary	Grammy-nominated record producer and performer who formed Club Nouveau	
Glenn Leonard	Upsilon Sigma	Member of The Temptations	
Ramsey Lewis	Honorary	Jazz composer and pianist; three-time Grammy Award winner	
Joe Madison	Honorary	Radio talk-show host	
Ellis Marsalis Jr.	Epsilon Alpha	Jazz pianist, composer, and educator; 2023 Grammy Trustees Award	
Al McKay	Honorary	Guitarist, songwriter, and former member of Earth, Wind & Fire	
VaShawn Mitchell	Honorary	Gospel singer and songwriter	
Clarence Muse	Phi Beta Sigma	Actor, screenwriter, director, composer, and lawyer; First African American to appear in a starring role in a film and first African American Broadway director	
Babatunde Olatunji	Chi	Drummer; composed music for the Broadway and film adaptations of A Raisin in the Sun; included in the Grammy-winning album Planet Drum	
Jerry Peters	Honorary	Songwriter, record producer, multi-instrumentalist, conductor, and arranger	
Louis Price	Upsilon Sigma	Member of The Temptations	
Leon Robinson	Honorary	Actor and singer	
Al Roker	Honorary	Weather anchor for NBC's Today show; co-host of Wake Up with Al; author and actor	
Joe Sample	Beta Delta	Jazz keyboardist, composer, and founding member of The Jazz Crusaders	
Kevin Saunderson	Zeta Epsilon	DJ and record producer credited with pioneering the techno music genre as part of The Belleville Three	
Wayne Shorter	Honorary	Multiple Grammy Award-winning jazz saxophonist and composer	
Special Ed (rapper)	Honorary	Hip hop recording artist and producer	
Shawn Stockman	Honorary	Member of the vocal group Boyz II Men	
Richard Street	Upsilon Sigma	Member of The Temptations	
Kevin Toney	Honorary	Jazz pianist and composer who was a member of The Blackbyrds	
Walter Turnbull	Honorary	Musician and founder of the Harlem Boys Choir	
Blair Underwood	Honorary	Actor; NAACP Image Award, Emmy Award, and Grammy Award winner	
Ben Vereen	Honorary	Stage, television, and film actor; Tony Award winner; American Theater Hall of Fame	
Hezekiah Walker	Honorary	Gospel music artist	
Verdine White	Honorary	Bass guitarist and founding member of Earth, Wind & Fire; Rock and Roll Hall of Fame, Songwriters Hall of Fame, and Kennedy Center Honors	
D'Extra Wiley	Phi Beta Sigma	Entertainer, producer, and member of II D Extreme	
Armstrong Williams	Eta Alpha	Radio and television show host	
Otis Williams	Upsilon Sigma	Founding member of The Temptations; Rock and Roll Hall of Fame	
Lawrence Winters	Alpha	Opera singer; first Black singer to perform standard operatic roles regularly with the New York City Centre Opera	
Malik Yoba	Honorary	Actor best known for New York Undercover; NAACP Image Award winner	

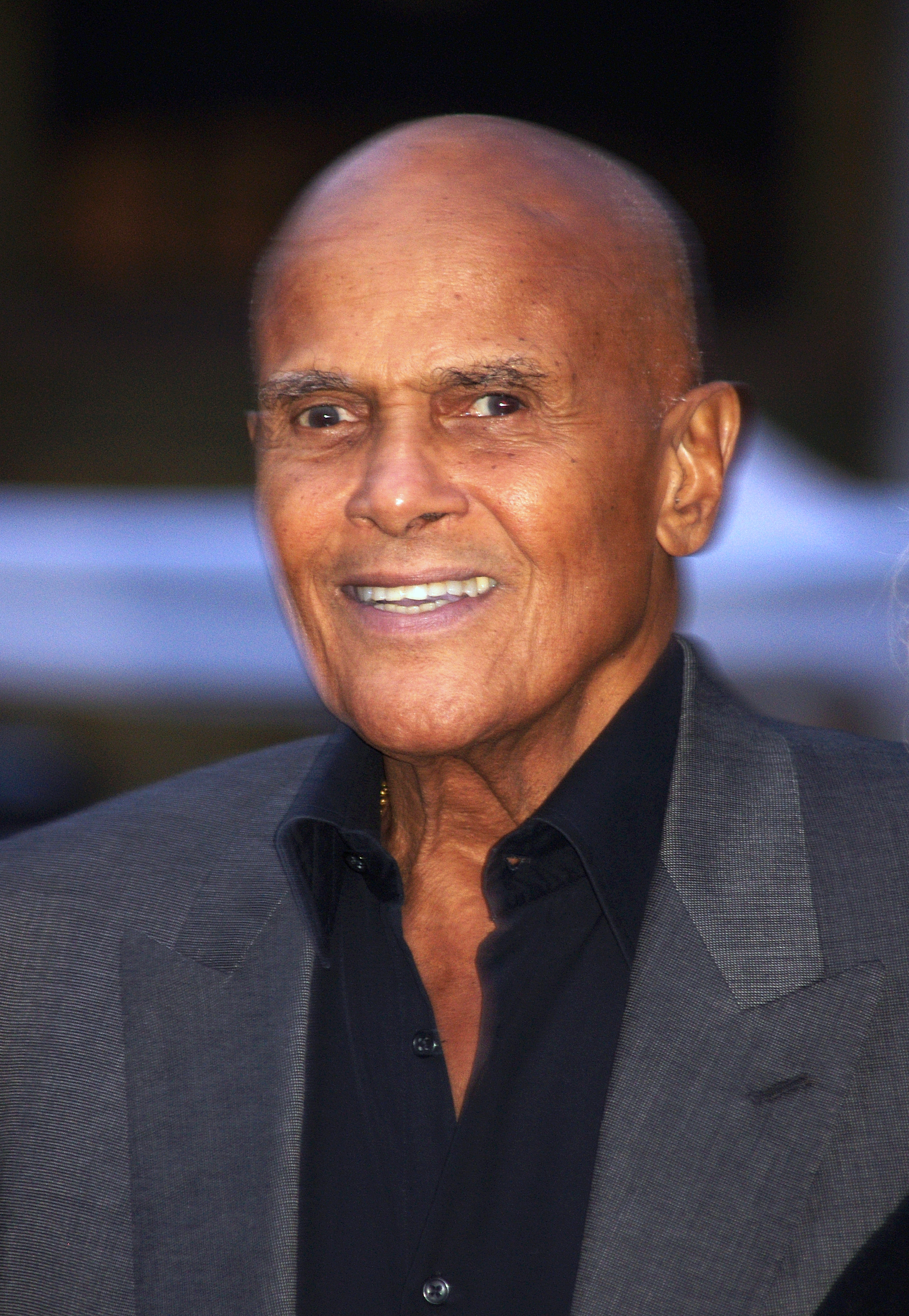
Harry Belafonte

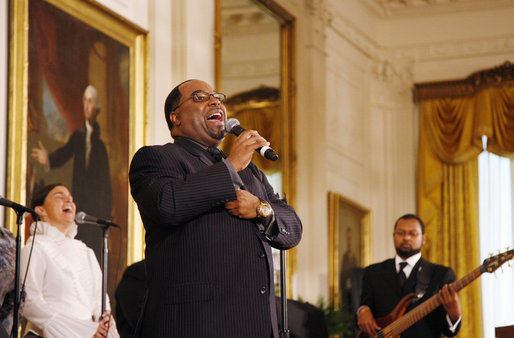
Kurt Carr

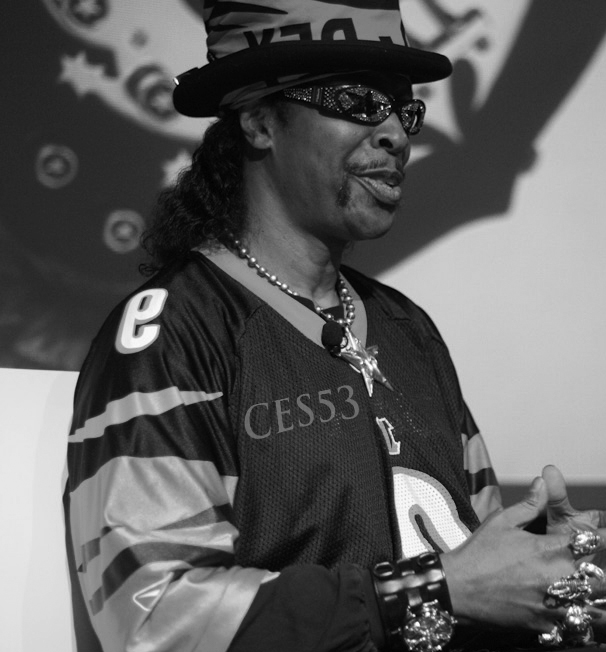
Bootsy Collins

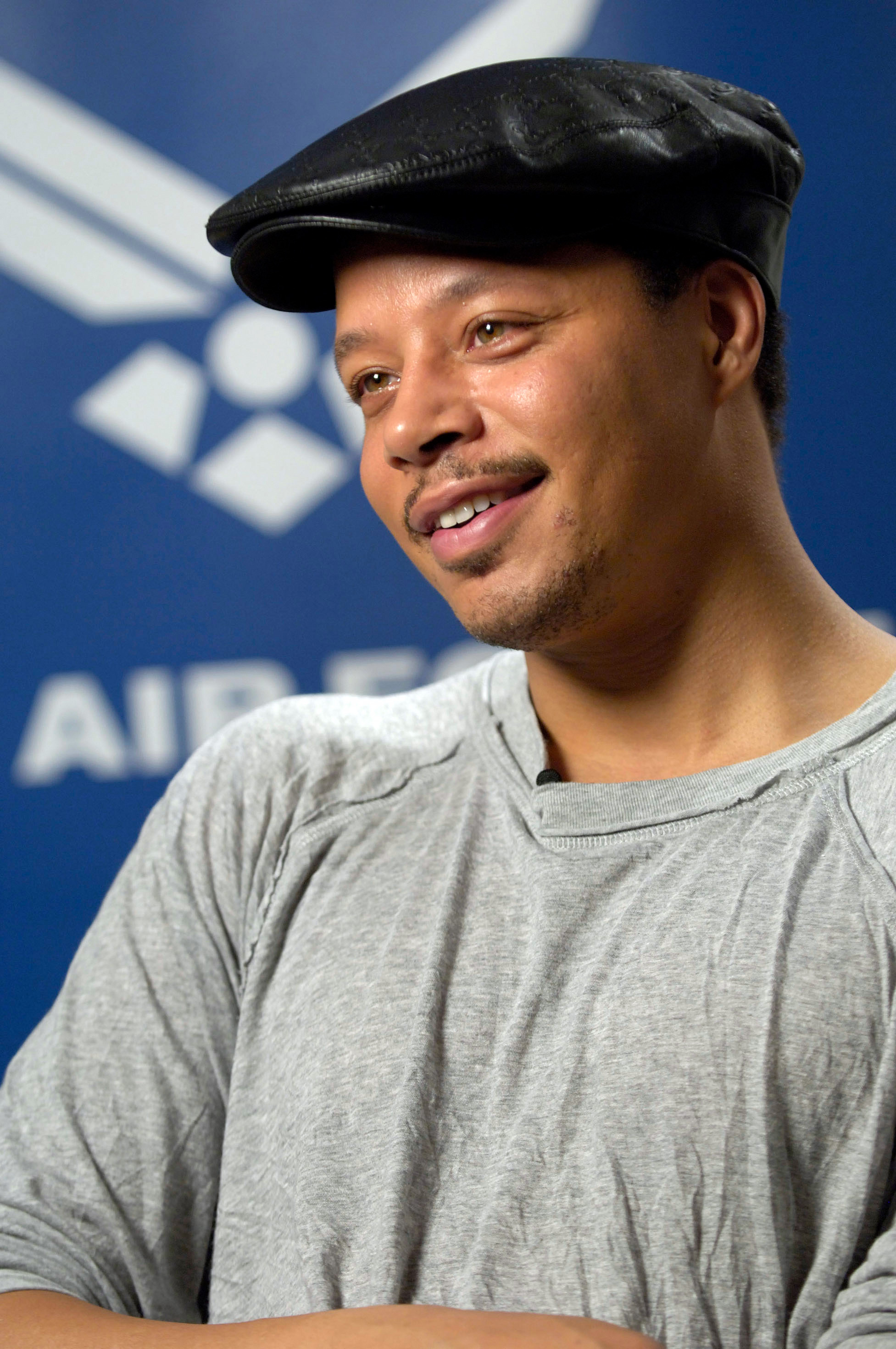
Terrence Howard

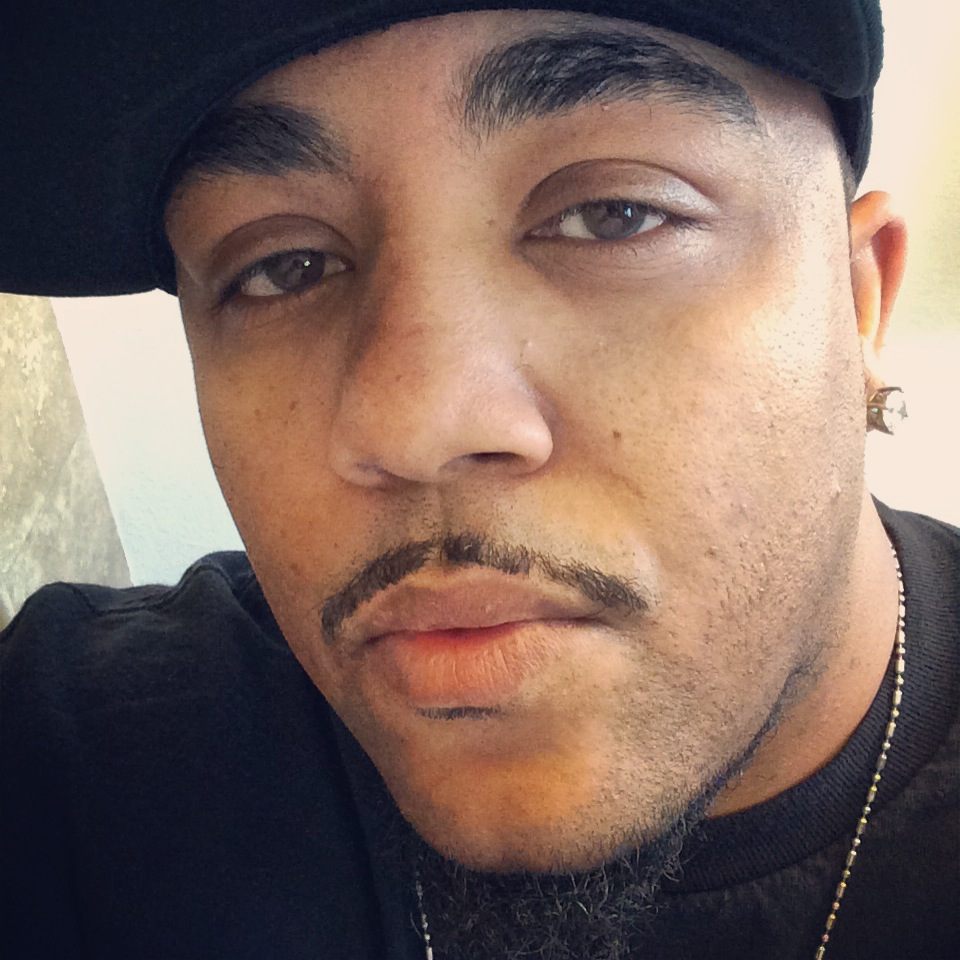
Emcee N.I.C.E.

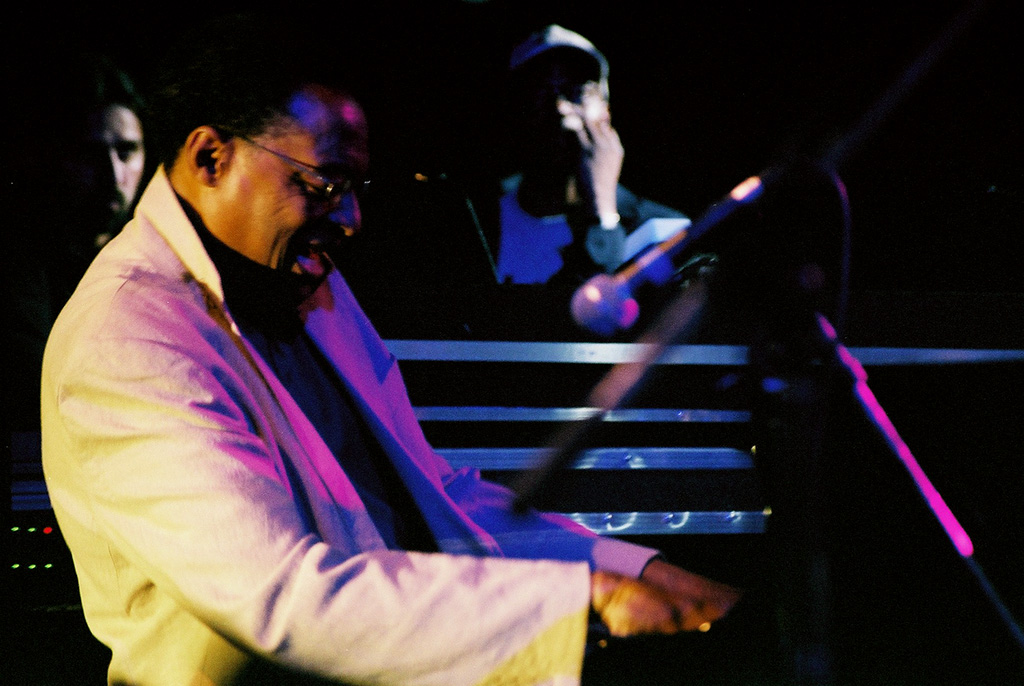
Ramsey Lewis

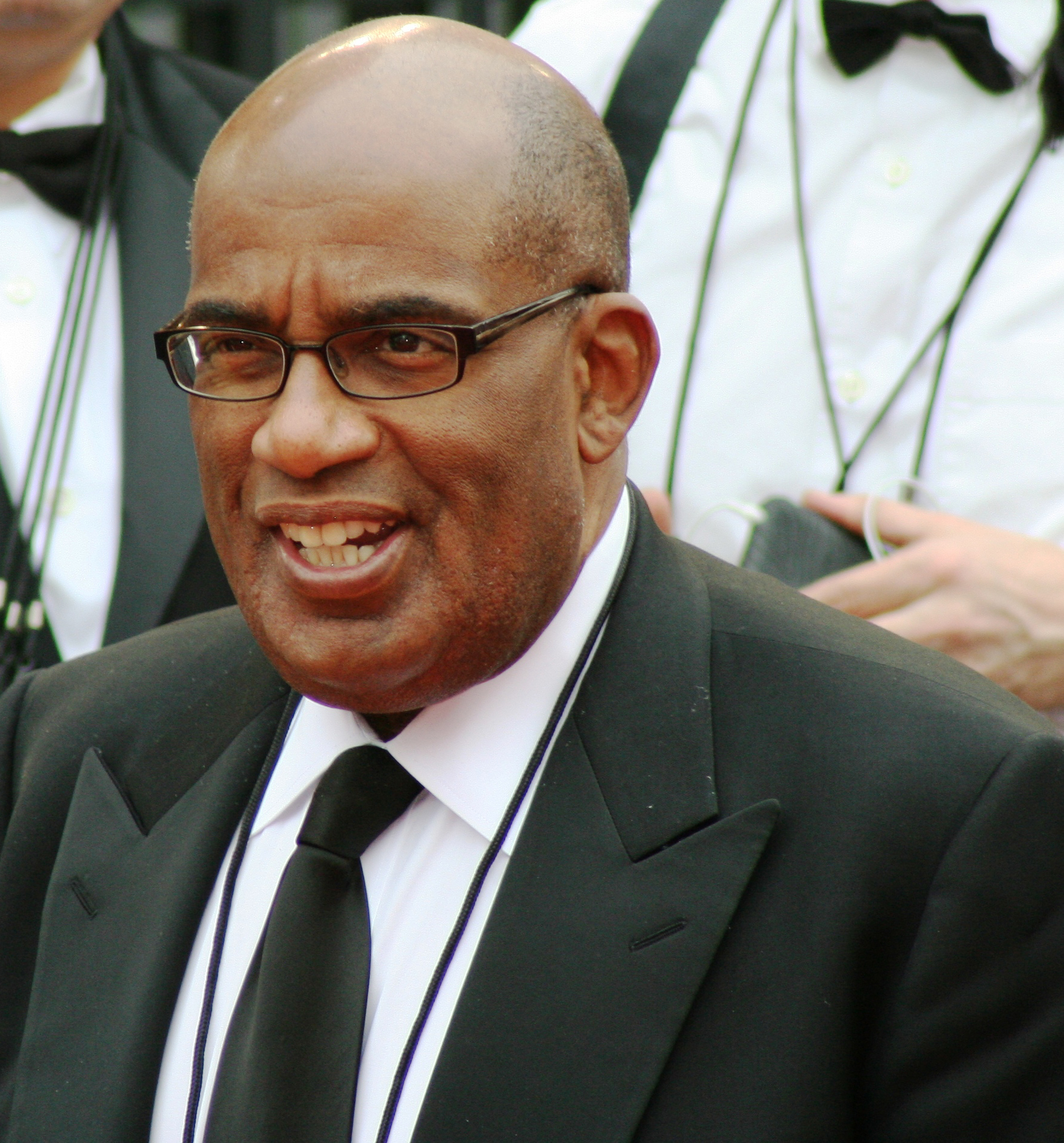
Al Roker

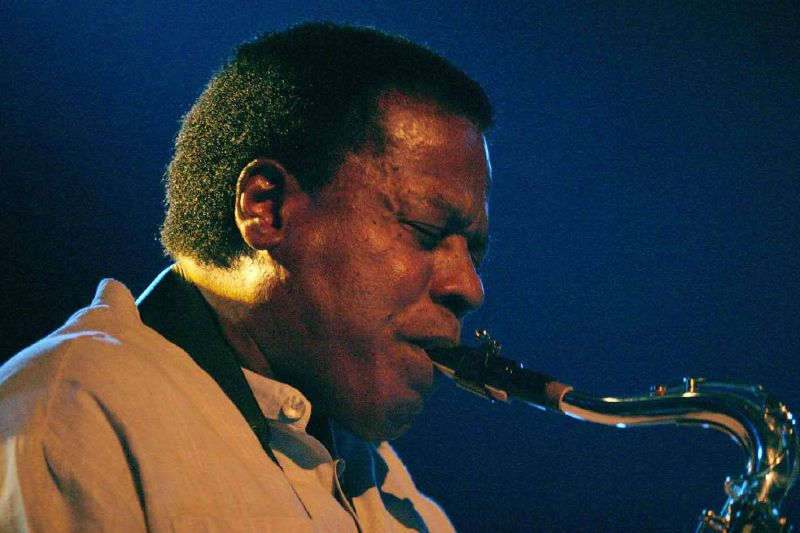
Wayne Shorter

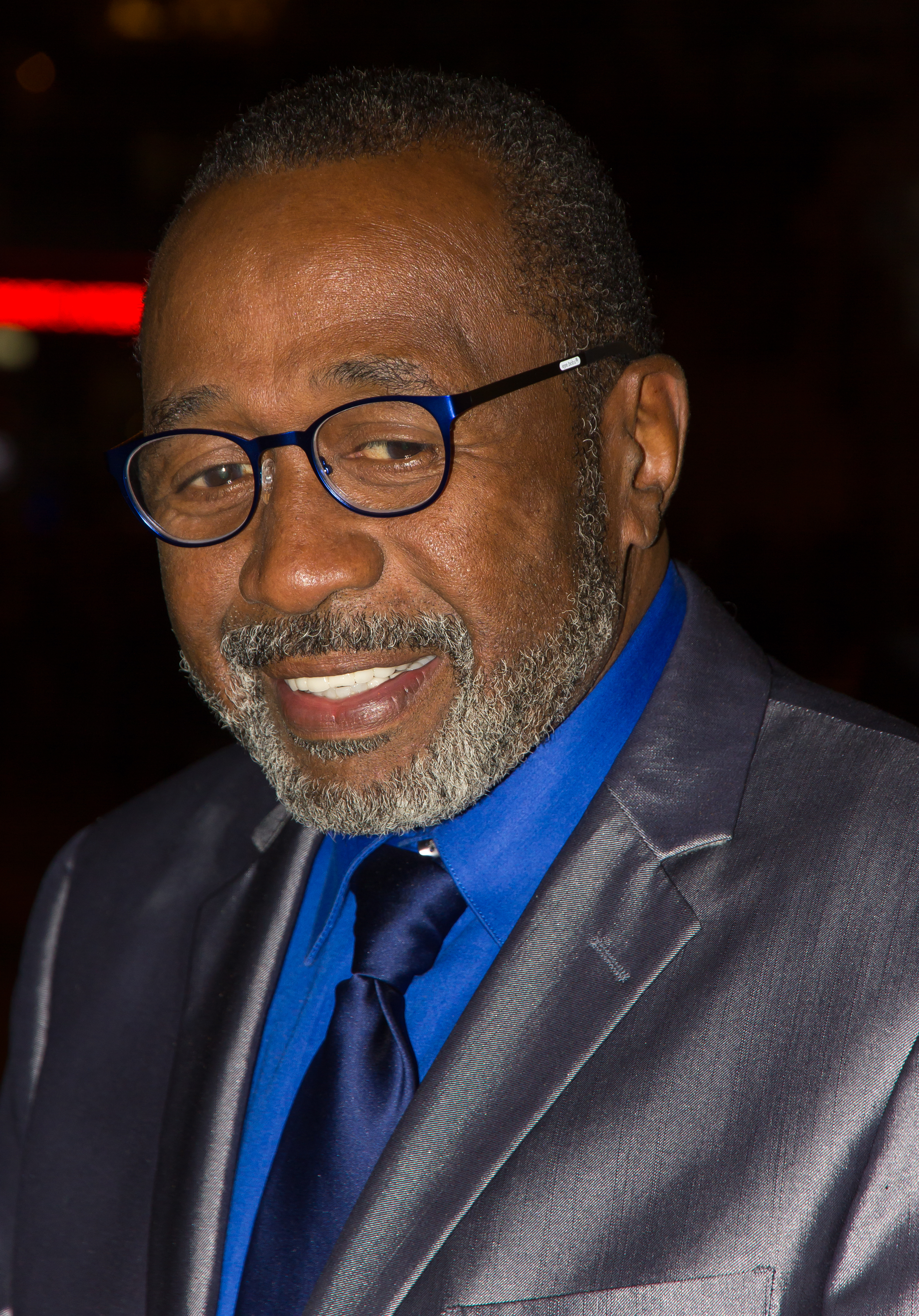
Ben Vereen

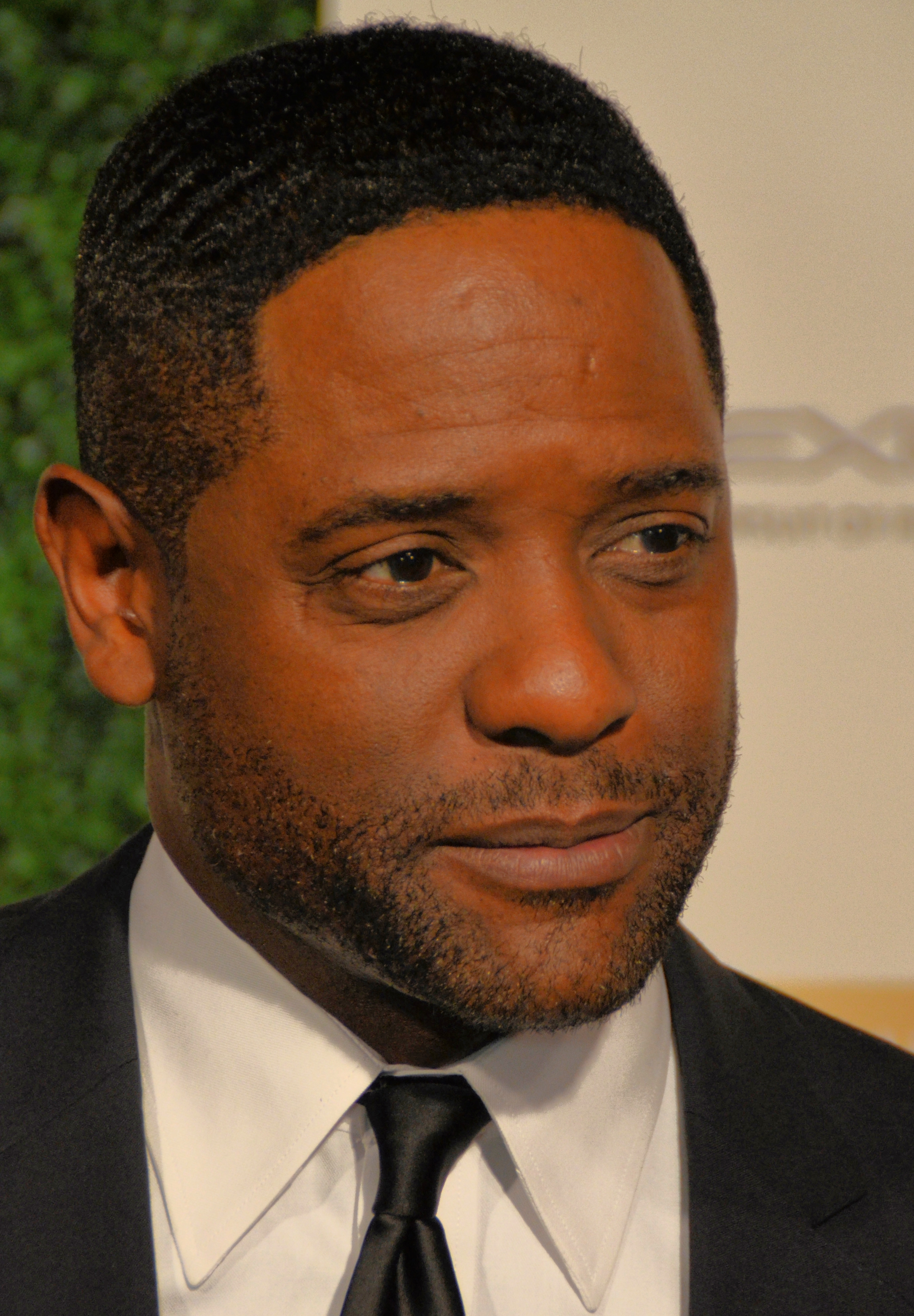
Blair Underwood

== Law ==
Name	Original chapter	Notability	Ref.
Charles Bernard Day	Epsilon Psi	Magistrate Judge of the United States District Court for the District of Maryland	
Charles E. Freeman	Upsilon Sigma	First African American justice of the Illinois Supreme Court	
Morris Overstreet	Alpha Beta Sigma	First African American to sit on the Texas Court of Criminal Appeals	
Robert Heberton Terrell	Alpha	First black municipal judge in Washington, D.C.; first black honors graduate from Harvard College	
James E. Winfield	Kappa Epsilon Sigma	Civil rights lawyer, politician, former city prosecutor in Vicksburg, Mississippi	

== Literature and journalism ==
Name	Original chapter	Notability	Ref.
Barry Beckham	Pi Beta Sigma	Playwright and novelist; Lecturer at Brown University	
Frank Marshall Davis	Delta	Writer, author and journalist during the Harlem Renaissance; made a tremendous impact on African-American literature	
Angelo Henderson	Mu Theta	winner of the Pulitzer Prize winning journalist; radio show host	
Alain LeRoy Locke	Alpha	First Black Rhodes Scholar; writer, philosopher, and educator, called the "father of the Harlem Renaissance"	

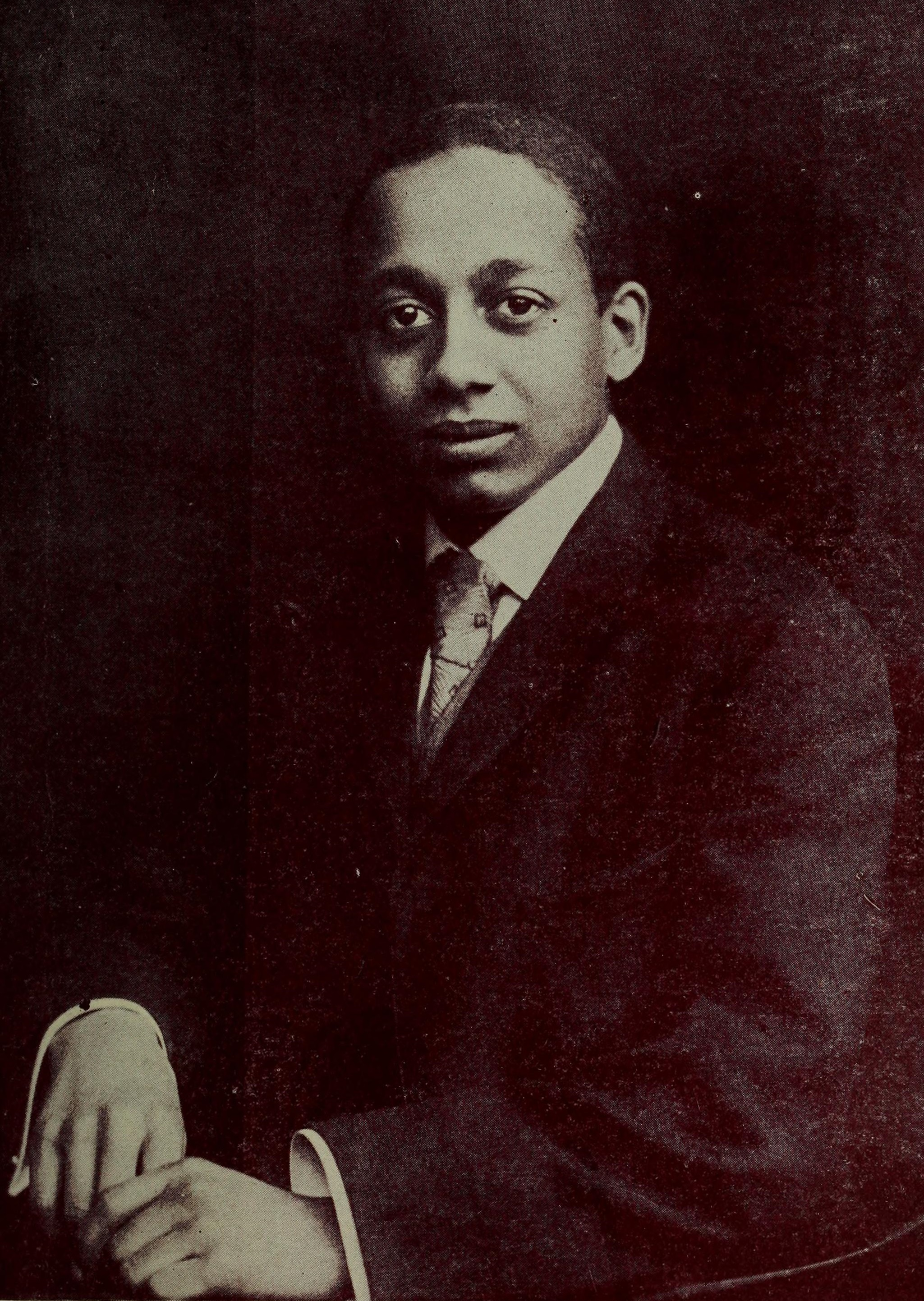
Alain LeRoy Locke

== Military ==
Name	Original chapter	Notability	Ref.
Howard D. Queen	Alpha	U.S. Army colonel and commanding officer of the all-Black 366th Infantry Regiment during WWII; also served in the 10th Cavalry Regiment during WWI	

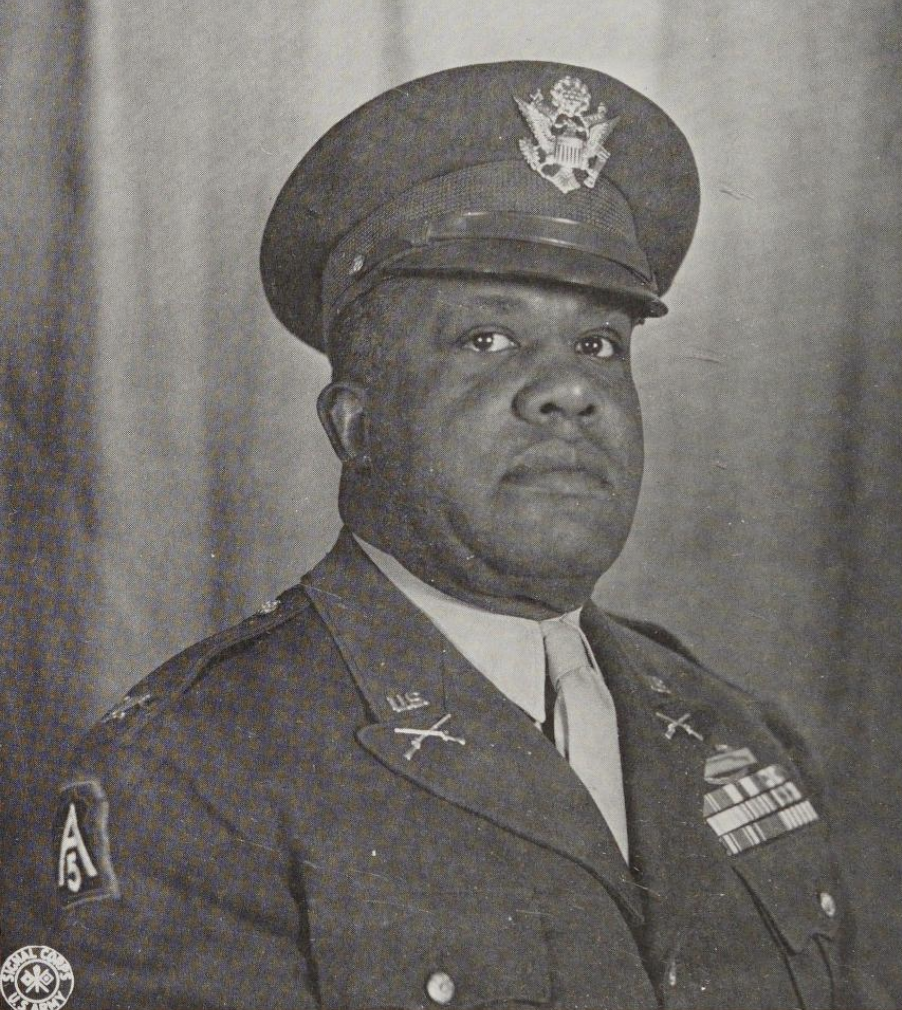
Howard D. Queen

== Politics ==
=== Heads of state ===
Name	Original chapter	Notability	Ref.
Benjamin Nnamdi Azikiwe	Mu	First President of Nigeria, referred to as the "father of Nigerian nationalism", major driving force behind the country's independence in 1960	
Bill Clinton	Honorary	42nd President of the United States	
Philip E. Davis	Delta Epsilon Sigma	5th Prime Minister of the Bahamas	
Kwame Nkrumah	Mu	First President of Ghana, instrumental in the Gold Coast's independence from the United Kingdom	
William Tolbert	Beta Upsilon Sigma	20th President of Liberia	
William V.S. Tubman	Beta Upsilon Sigma	19th President of Liberia; regarded as the "father of Modern Liberia"	

Bill Clinton

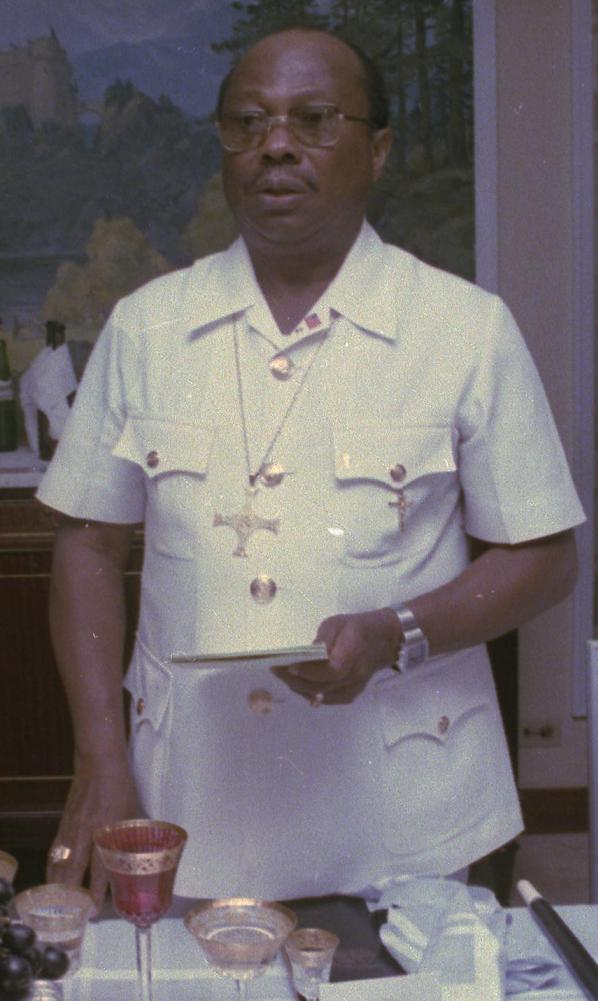
William Tolbert

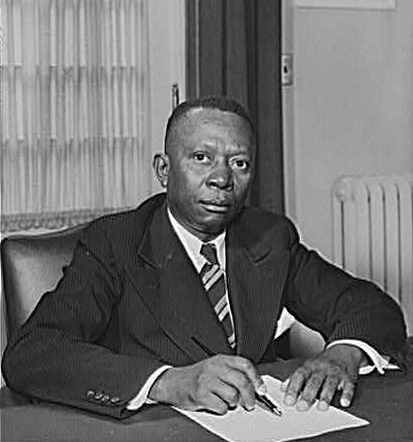
William V.S. Tubman

=== United States Congress ===
Name	Original chapter	Notability	Ref.
Elijah Cummings	Honorary	United States House of Representatives (Maryland's 7th district), Chair of the House Oversight Committee; Maryland House of Delegates	
Adriano Espaillat	Sigma Sigma Sigma	United States House of Representatives (New York's 13th district), first Dominican-American and first formerly undocumented immigrant to serve in Congress; Chair of the Congressional Hispanic Caucus; New York State Senate, and New York State Assembly	
Maxwell Frost	Honorary	United States House of Representatives (Florida's 10th district); First ever Generation Z member in Congress	
La Shawn Ford	Epsilon Xi	United States House of Representatives (Illinois's 7th congressional district)	
John Lewis	Lambda Sigma	United States House of Representatives (Georgia's 5th district); Civil rights activist, helped organized the 1963 March on Washington and 1965 Selma to Montgomery marches; chairman of the Student Nonviolent Coordinating Committee; Presidential Medal of Freedom	
Donavan Deante McKinney	Nu Alpha Sigma	United States House of Representatives (Michigan's 13th congressional district)	
Arthur W. Mitchell	Theta Gamma	United States House of Representatives (Illinois' 1st district), first African American to be elected to Congress as a Democrat; 6th Past International President from 1926-1934	
Edolphus Towns	Eta	United States House of Representatives	
Harold Washington	Upsilon Sigma	First African-American Mayor of Chicago, United States House of Representatives, Illinois House of Representatives, and Illinois Senate	

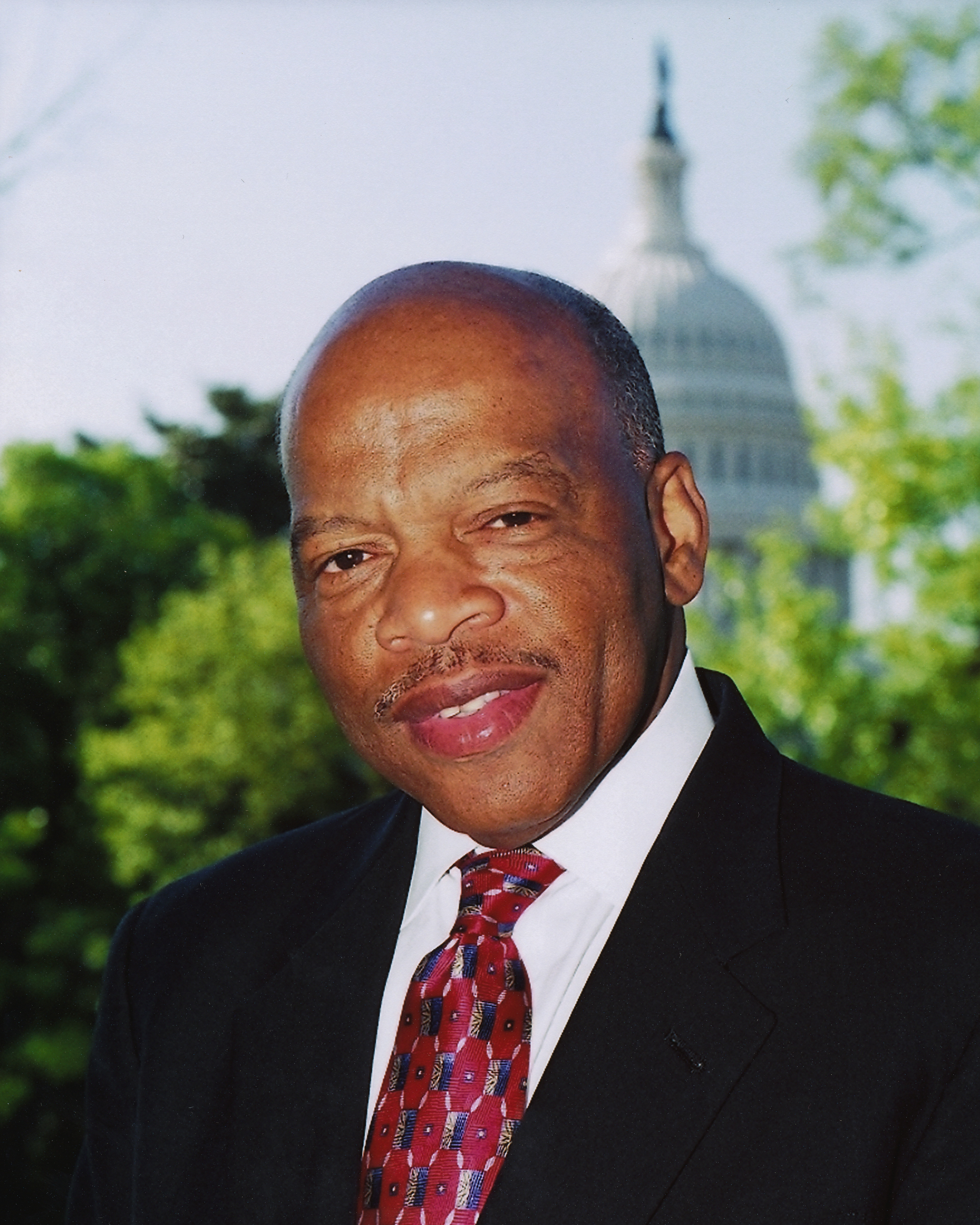
John Lewis

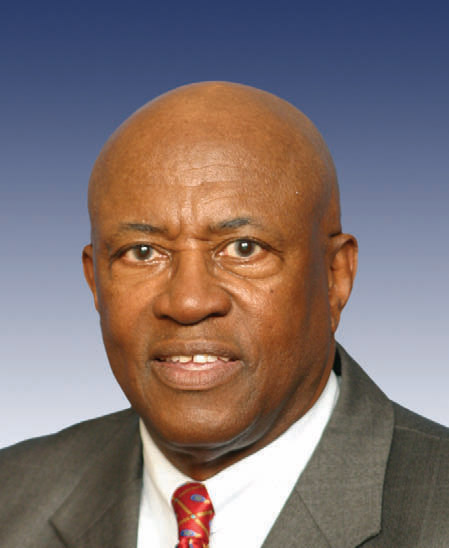
Edolphus Towns

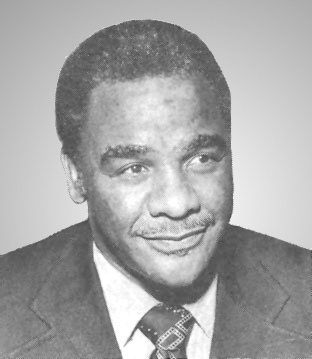
Harold Washington

=== Diplomats ===
Name	Original chapter	Notability	Ref.
Melvin Evans	Alpha	United States Ambassador to Trinidad and Tobago, First elected Governor of the United States Virgin Islands; and delegate to the United States House of Representatives	
James Weldon Johnson	Psi	U.S. consul in Venezuela and Nicaragua, executive secretary of the NAACP, author of The Autobiography of an Ex-Colored Man and the Black National Anthem "Lift Ev'ry Voice and Sing"	
Harry K. Thomas Jr.	Honorary	Former United States Ambassador; serving positions overseas in Bangladesh, the Philippines, and Zimbabwe	

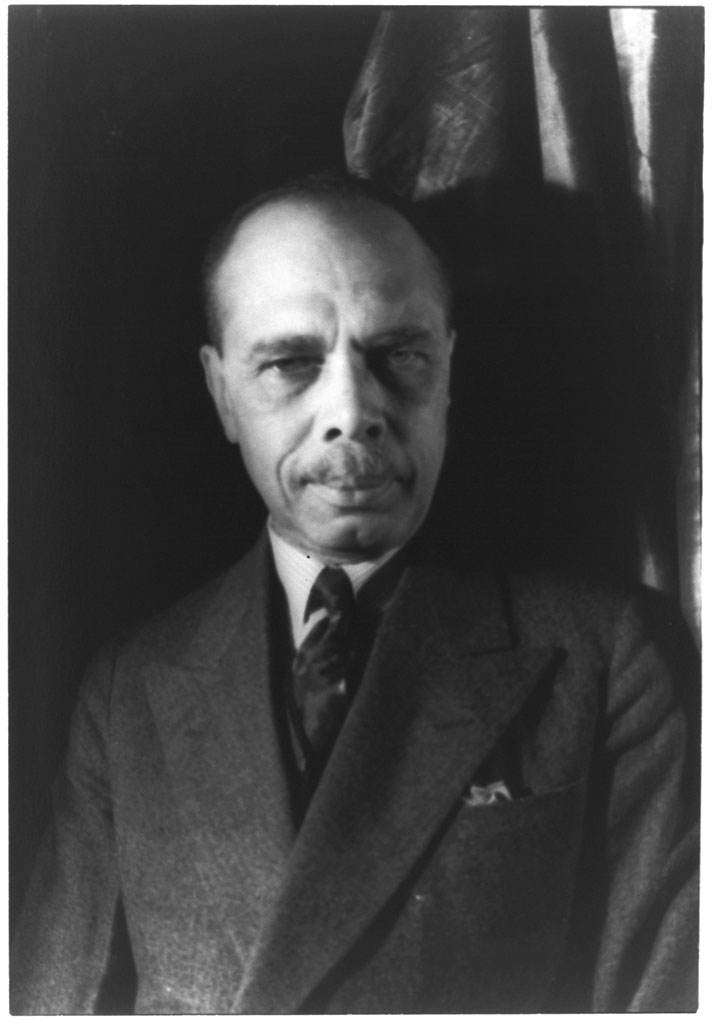
James Weldon Johnson

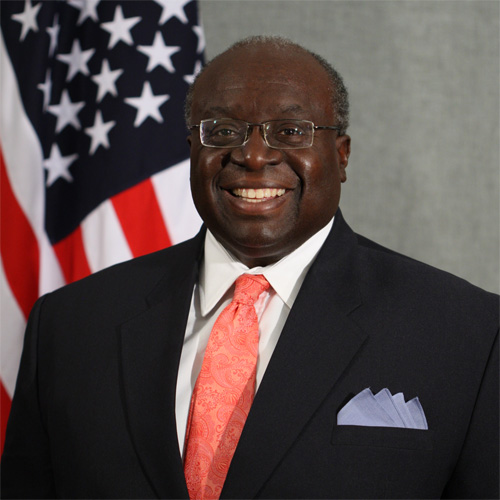
Harry K. Thomas Jr.

=== State legislators and offices ===
Name	Original chapter	Notability	Ref.
Scherod C. Barnes	Zeta Sigma	Member of the Maryland House of Delegates	
Larry Blanding	Omicron	Member of the South Carolina House of Representatives	
Robert J. Booker	Beta Eta	Member of the Tennessee House of Representatives; Civil rights activist and executive director for the Beck Cultural Exchange Center	
Les Brown	Honorary	Member of the Ohio House of Representatives	
Kevin Chambliss	Nu Kappa Sigma	Member of the Florida House of Representatives	
Michael Crawford	Epsilon Gamma	Member of the Illinois House of Representatives	
Reuben D'Silva	Pi Zeta	Member of the Nevada State Assembly, first Indian-American elected to the house; Purple Heart recipient	
Landon Dais	Chi	Member of the New York State Assembly	
Kenneth Dunkin	Upsilon Sigma	Member of the Illinois House of Representatives	
Arthur Earley	Alpha	Member of the Pennsylvania House of Representatives	
Cedrick Frazier	Zeta Nu Sigma	Member of the Minnesota House of Representatives	
Jordan A. Harris	Xi Chi	Member of the Pennsylvania House of Representatives	
Rick Jennings	Epsilon Psi	Member of the Sacramento City Council; former professional football player with the Oakland Raiders and San Francisco 49ers, Super Bowl XI champion	
Jermaine Johnson	Lambda Psi	Member of the South Carolina House of Representatives	
Fleming A. Jones	Xi Sigma	Member of the West Virginia House of Delegates	
Juan LaFonta	Iota Lambda	Member of the Louisiana House of Representatives	
Gilbert W. Lindsay	Phi Beta Sigma	Member of the Los Angeles City Council, first African American elected to the council; Served as vice-president and on the Board of Directors for the NAACP	
Willie Logan	Theta Rho Sigma	Member of the Florida House of Representatives	
Kevin Matthews	Lambda Pi	Former member of the Oklahoma Senate and Oklahoma House of Representatives	
Kevin Murray		Member of the California State Assembly and California State Senate	
Demetrius Newton	Tau Sigma	first African-American Speaker Pro-Tem of the Alabama House of Representatives; lawyer	
Oliver Robinson	Eta Epsilon	former Member of the Alabama House of Representatives	
Malcolm Ruff	Alpha Alpha Chi	Member of the Maryland House of Delegates	
Rod Scott	Tau Sigma	Member of the Alabama House of Representatives	
Troy Singleton	Theta Psi	Member of the New Jersey General Assembly	
Samuel J. Smith	Beta Omicron	Member of the Washington House of Representatives; President of the Seattle City Council, one of the first African American city councilmembers in Washington State	
DeForest Soaries	Honorary	Secretary of State of New Jersey, Baptist minister, author, and public advocate	
Ontario Tillman	Gamma Epsilon	Member of the Alabama House of Representatives	
J. David Weeks	Delta Kappa Sigma	Member of the South Carolina House of Representatives	

=== Other countries ===
Name	Original chapter	Notability	Ref.
Francisco Cornerio		Former U.S. Virgin Islands Attorney General (1961-1969)	
Babs Fafunwa	Beta Upsilon	Former Nigerian Minister of Education; co-founder of the Muslim Students Society of Nigeria and the first Nigerian Professor of Education	
Shane Gibson		Member of Parliament and Minister of Immigration, Labour and Training of the Commonwealth of The Bahamas	
Richard Abrom Henries	Beta Upsilon Sigma	Speaker of the Liberian House of Representatives	
Kendal Major	Beta Kappa	Speaker of the House of Assembly and Member of Parliament, The Bahamas	
Phenton Neymour	Theta Xi	Bahamas Member of Parliament, Minister of State for Works	
Arleigh Winston Scott	Epsilon Sigma	First native Governor-General of Barbados, knighted by Queen Elizabeth II in 1967	

=== Local ===
Name	Original chapter	Notability	Ref.
Eldridge Hawkins Jr.	Lambda Lambda Sigma	Mayor of Orange, New Jersey	
Hulan Jack	Alpha Delta	First black borough president of Manhattan, New York	
Yusef Salaam	Honorary	member of the New York City Council; one of the Exonerated Five	

== Religion ==
Name	Original chapter	Notability	Ref.
Joseph H. Jackson		former president of the National Baptist Convention, USA	
Howard Z. Plummer	Alpha Alpha	Cardinal Bishop of the Church of God and Saints of Christ	
Prince Albert Taylor Jr.	Theta	Bishop in the Methodist Church (USA) and the United Methodist Church	

== Science and medicine ==
Name	Original chapter	Notability	Ref.
Alvin Drew	Honorary	NASA Astronaut	
Victor Glover	Omicron Pi	NASA Astronaut; Pilot on the first operational flight of the SpaceX Crew Dragon to the International Space Station, Became the first African American to fly beyond low Earth orbit and travel to the Moon's vicinity on Artemis II	
John A. Kenney Sr.		Medical director at Tuskegee Institute; founder and first editor of the Journal of the National Medical Association	
Richard Allen Williams	Honorary	physician, founder of the Association of Black Cardiologists	

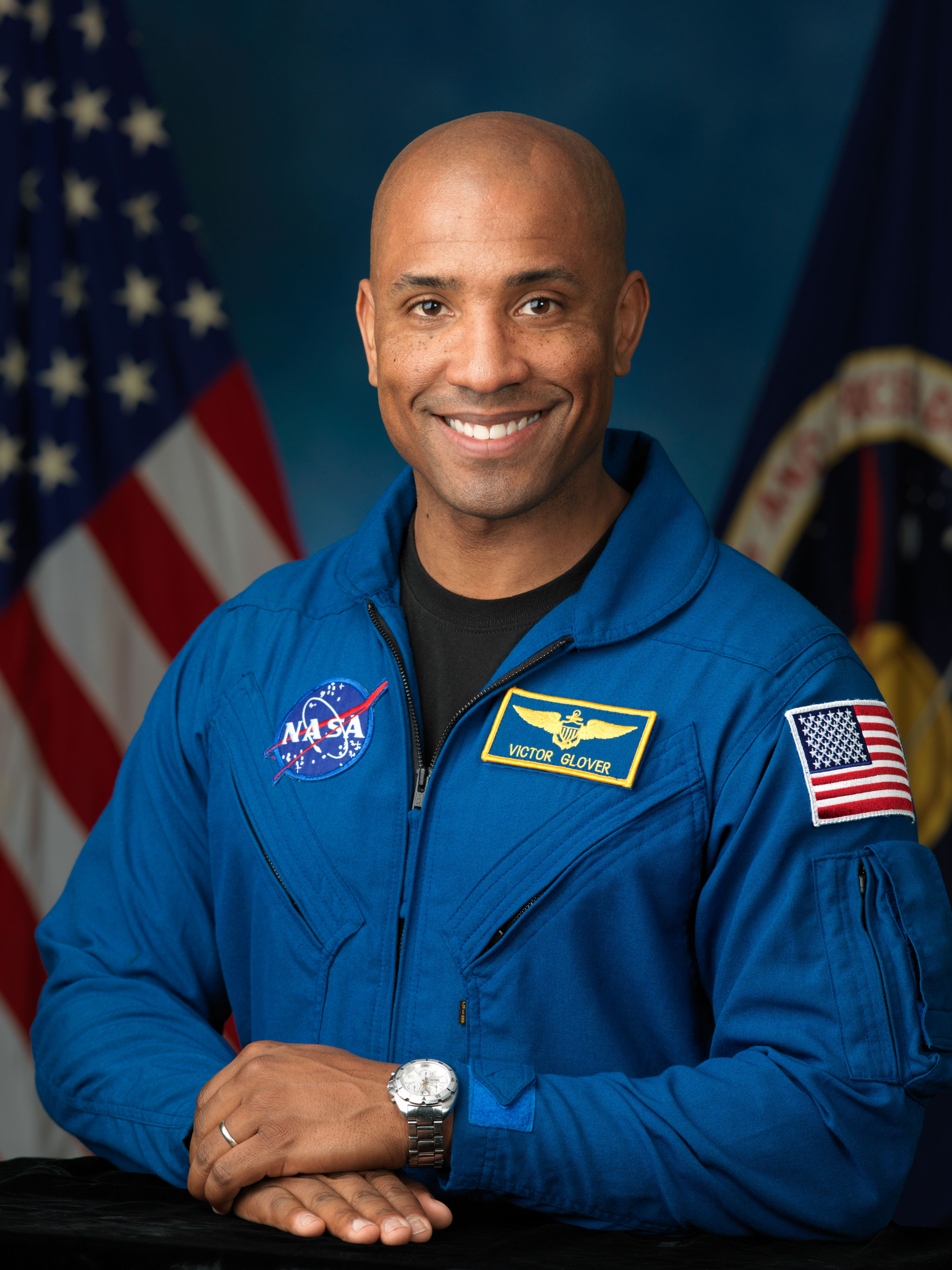
Victor Glover

== Sports ==
=== Coaches ===
Name	Original chapter	Notability	Ref.
Derrick Ansley	Alpha Alpha Lambda	Defensive coach for the Oakland Raiders, Los Angeles Chargers, Green Bay Packers, and Dallas Cowboys	
Greg Burns	Alpha Beta Alpha	College football coach for Washington State University	
James Carson	Mu Sigma	Head football coach of the Jackson State Tigers	
Perry Carter	Theta Eta	Cornerbacks coach for the Northwestern State Demons football team; former professional football player with the Kansas City Chiefs and Oakland Raiders	
Jim Catanzaro	Nu Lambda Sigma	Head football coach and athletic director for Lake Forest College	
Phillip Daniels	Zeta Nu	Defensive line coach for the Ottawa Redblacks, Saskatchewan Roughriders, and Philadelphia Eagles; Super Bowl LII champion and 2025 Grey Cup champion; Former professional football player for the Seattle Seahawks, Chicago Bears, and Washington Redskins	
Winston DeLattiboudere III	Pi Eta	Defensive line coach for Michigan State, Minnesota, Akron, and the Arizona Cardinals	
Nick Eason	Omicron Mu Sigma	Associate head coach and defensive tackles coach for Clemson; Former professional player for the Denver Broncos, Cleveland Browns, Pittsburgh Steelers, and Arizona Cardinals; Super Bowl XLIII champion	
Jake Gaither	Beta Eta	Florida A&M Rattlers football head coach, athletic director of the Florida A&M Rattlers; eight-time Black college football national champion, College Football Hall of Fame	
Terrence Graves	Delta Alpha	Head coach for Southern Jaguars football	
Lee Hardman	Beta Theta	Head football coach at the University of Arkansas at Pine Bluff	
Robert "Judge" Hughes	Mu Sigma	Head football coach for Jackson State; Former professional football player with the Atlanta Falcons	
Otis Hughley Jr.	Mu Kappa	Head coach of the Senegal women's national basketball team; previously served as the head coach of the Nigeria women's national basketball team and Alabama A&M, 2x AfroBasket Women champion	
Jerald Ingram	Delta Rho	Running backs coach for the Jacksonville Jaguars and New York Giants; Super Bowl XLII and XLVI champion	
Derek Jones	Eta Beta	Cornerbacks coach for the Tennessee Volunteers	
Mike London	Mu Omicron	Head coach of the William & Mary Tribe football team and the University of Richmond	
Ulysses S. McPherson	Zeta Alpha	Head football coach and athletic administrator at Morristown College, Mississippi Vocational College, and Jackson State	
Marvin Menzies	Zeta Tau	Head coach for Kansas City Roos men's basketball, New Mexico State Aggies men's basketball, and UNLV Runnin' Rebels basketball	
Billy Nicks	Kappa Beta Sigma	Head football coach for Morris Brown and Prairie View A&M; 6x Black college national champion, College Football Hall of Fame	
Tyrone Nix	Theta Eta	College football coach at Southern Miss, South Carolina, Ole Miss, Middle Tennessee, Texas A&M, UTSA, and Tarleton State	
Eddie Payton	Alpha Beta	Head golf coach at Jackson State; Former professional football player with the Cleveland Browns, Detroit Lions, Kansas City Chiefs, and Minnesota Vikings	
Todd Pinkston	Theta Eta	Running backs coach for the Kansas City Chiefs, Super Bowl LVIII champion; Former professional football player with the Philadelphia Eagles	
Kacy Rodgers	Kappa Chi	Professional football coach for the Dallas Cowboys, Miami Dolphins, New York Jets, Tampa Bay Buccaneers, and Detroit Lions; Super Bowl LV champion	
James Spady	Omicron Tau	College football coach at UTEP, South Carolina State, North Carolina Central, Grambling State, University of Nevada, Alabama A&M, and FAMU	
Charlie Strong	Iota Pi	Head football coach at the University of South Florida	
Ricky Thomas	Theta Delta	Assistant coach with the Tampa Bay Buccaneers and Indianapolis Colts, which won Super Bowl XLI	
Roy Thompson Jr.	Mu Beta Sigma	Head football coach for Arkansas Tech	
Maxwell Thurmond	Zeta Mu Sigma	College football coach for Jacksonville State, Reinhardt University, West Alabama, Austin Peay, University of Central Arkansas, and UNC Charlotte	
Lorenzo Ward	Theta Delta	College football coach for UT Chattanooga, Virginia Tech, University of Arkansas, University of South Carolina, Fresno State, University of Louisville, and Clemson University	
Kevin Whitley	Eta	College football coach for Georgia Southern; Former professional football player with the Toronto Argonauts	
Gerard Wilcher	Chi	College football coach for Texas A&M University - Kingsville	
Sherman Wood	Theta Kappa	Head football coach for Salisbury University and Bowie State	

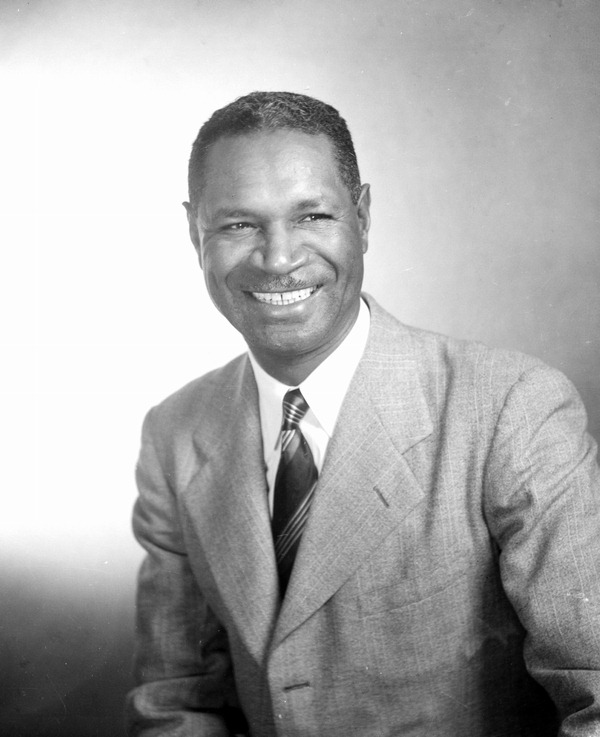
Jake Gaither

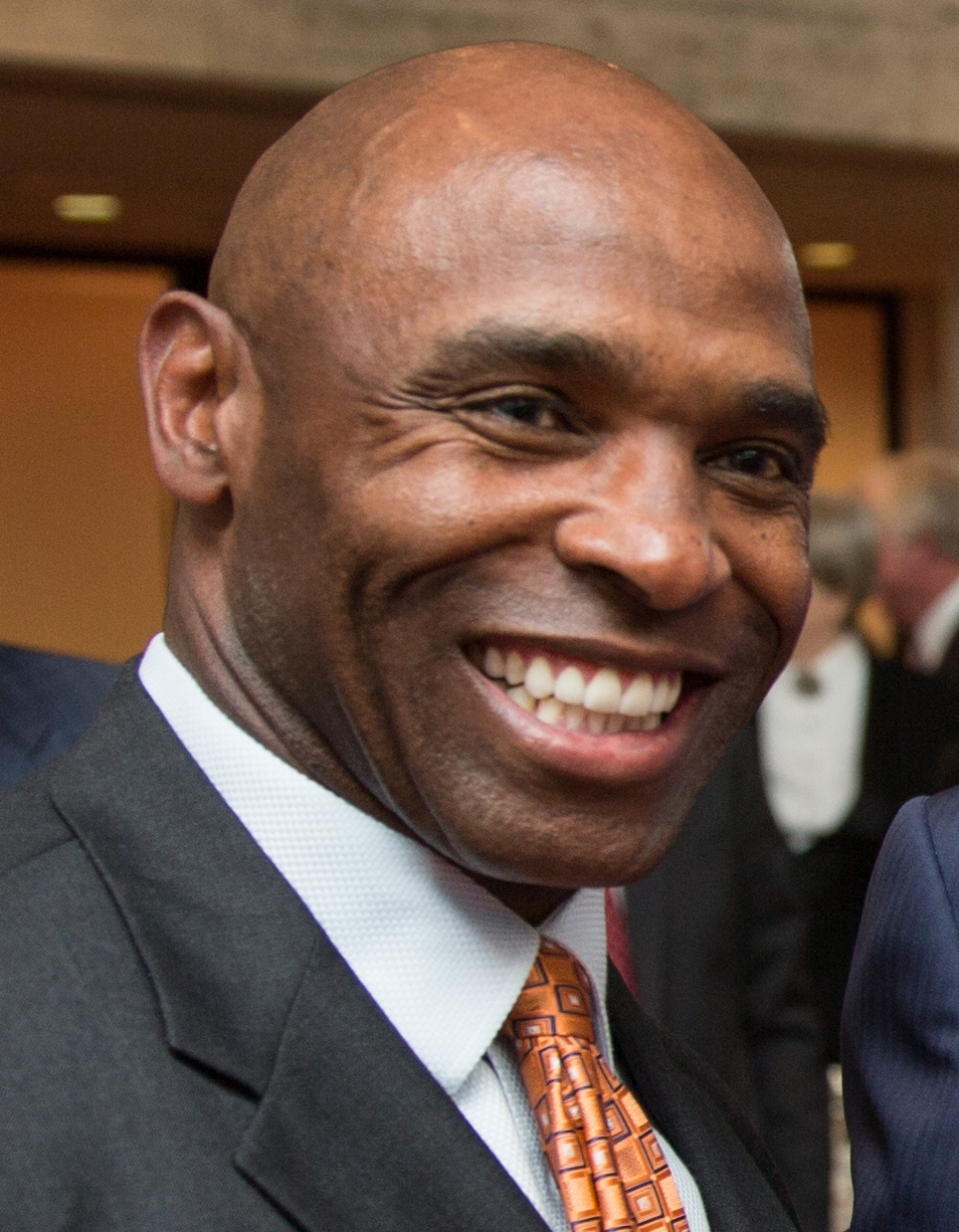
Charlie Strong

=== American football ===
Name	Original chapter	Notability	Ref.
Keion Adams	Pi Lambda Sigma	Professional football player with the Pittsburgh Steelers and New York Giants	
Kevin Alexander	Alpha Alpha Omicron	Professional football player with the New York Giants	
DeJuan Alfonzo	Zeta Psi	Professional football player with the Chicago Rush of the Arena Football League; ArenaBowl XX champion	
Andre Allen	Pi Kappa	Professional football player with the Las Vegas Posse	
Ian Allen	Zeta Phi	Professional football player with the New York Giants, Philadelphia Eagles, and Arizona Cardinals	
Thomas Bailey	Kappa Zeta	Professional football player with the Cincinnati Bengals	
Shalon Baker	Alpha Iota Alpha	Professional football player with the San Jose SaberCats; Wide receivers coach for Montana Grizzlies football team	
Johnny Baldwin	Gamma Epsilon	Professional football player with the Kansas City Chiefs	
Buster Barnett	Lambda Eta	Professional football player with the Buffalo Bills	
Fred Barnett	Lambda Eta	Professional football player with the Philadelphia Eagles and Miami Dolphins	
Idrees Bashir	Delta Nu	Professional football player with the Indianapolis Colts, Carolina Panthers, and Detroit Lions	
Charlie Batch	Zeta Epsilon	Professional football player with the Detroit Lions and Pittsburgh Steelers; Super Bowl XL and Super Bowl XLIII champion	
Tim Beauchamp	Zeta Kappa	Professional football player with the Amsterdam Admirals, New York/New Jersey Hitmen, and Hamilton Tiger-Cats; Member of the 1996 national championship team	
Brian Bedford	Omicron Psi	Professional football player with the Toronto Argonauts and BC Lions	
Leon Bender	Alpha Beta Alpha	College football defensive tackle drafted by the Oakland Raiders; Died unexpectedly before the start of the season	
George Bethune	Theta Delta	Professional football player with the Los Angeles Rams	
Albert Bimper	Nu Xi	Professional football player with the Indianapolis Colts	
Richard Blackmore	Eta Lambda Sigma	Professional football player with the Philadelphia Eagles and San Francisco 49ers	
Alois Blackwell	Zeta Zeta	Professional football player with the Dallas Cowboys and the Kansas City Chiefs; Athletic director for Texas Southern University	
Eddie Blake	Kappa Zeta	Professional football player with the Miami Dolphins	
Greg Blue	Zeta Nu	Professional football player with the Minnesota Vikings and Detroit Lions	
Marion Body	Delta Rho	Professional football player with the Michigan Panthers	
Shermar Bracey	Lambda Eta	Professional football player with the Saskatchewan Roughriders	
Alundis Brice	Eta Beta	Professional football player with the Dallas Cowboys; Super Bowl XXX champion	
Walter Briggs	Kappa Epsilon	Professional football player with the New York Jets	
Vincent Brisby	Kappa Kappa	Professional football player with the New England Patriots and New York Jets	
Alex Brown	Zeta Kappa	Professional football player with the Chicago Bears and New Orleans Saints	
Guy Brown	Zeta Zeta	Professional football player with the Dallas Cowboys; Super Bowl XII champion	
Jared Brown	Pi Zeta	Professional football player with the San Jose SaberCats	
Larry Brown	Zeta Nu	Professional football player with the Tennessee Titans	
Lomas Brown	Zeta Kappa	Professional football player with the Detroit Lions, Arizona Cardinals, Cleveland Browns, New York Giants, and Tampa Bay Buccaneers; Super Bowl XXXVII champion; College Football Hall of Fame	
Lamont Burns	Xi Nu	Professional football player with the New York Jets and Washington Redskins	
Kenny Burrough	Beta Delta	Professional football player with the New Orleans Saints and Houston Oilers	
Taveze Calhoun	Theta Iota	Professional football player with the New Orleans Saints and Atlanta Falcons	
Ernie Calloway	Beta Delta	Professional football player with the Philadelphia Eagles and Kansas City Chiefs	
Kahlil Carter	Theta Nu	Professional football player in the Arena Football League, NFL Europe, and the Canadian Football League; Football coach in the CFL	
Pat Carter	Mu Epsilon	Professional football player with the Detroit Lions, Los Angeles / St. Louis Rams, Houston Oilers, and Arizona Cardinals	
Ran Carthon	Zeta Kappa	Professional football executive for the San Francisco 49ers, St. Louis / Los Angeles Rams, Atlanta Falcons, and Tennessee Titans; former player with the Indianapolis Colts	
Rich Caster	Alpha Beta	Professional football player with New York Jets, Houston Oilers, New Orleans Saints, and Washington Redskins; three-time Pro Bowl and Super Bowl XVII champion	
Jamar Chaney	Theta Iota	Professional football player with the Philadelphia Eagles	
Samuel Charles	Gamma Pi	Professional football player with the Wyoming Cavalry, Spokane Shock / Empire, Jacksonville Sharks, and Iowa Barnstormers	
Martin Chase	Xi Delta	Professional football player with the Baltimore Ravens, New Orleans Saints, Washington Redskins, New York Giants, and Jacksonville Jaguars	
Darryl Clack	Lambda Xi	Professional football player with the Dallas Cowboys	
Harvey Clayton	Mu Epsilon	Professional football player with the Pittsburgh Steelers and New York Giants	
Joey Clinkscales	Kappa Chi	Professional football player with the Pittsburgh Steelers; director of player personnel for the Oakland Raiders, scout for the New York Jets	
Ben Coates	Upsilon	Professional football player with the New England Patriots and Baltimore Ravens; five-time Pro Bowl and Super Bowl XXXV champion; Black College Football Hall of Fame	
Nate Coggins	Nu Phi	Professional football player with the Georgia Force, Austin Wranglers, and Columbus Destroyers	
Anthony Collins	Zeta Omicron	Professional football player with the Cincinnati Bengals and Tampa Bay Buccaneers	
Darren Comeaux	Lambda Xi	Professional football player with the Denver Broncos, San Francisco 49ers, and Seattle Seahawks	
Johnie Cooks	Theta Iota	Professional football player with the Indianapolis Colts, New York Giants, and the Cleveland Browns; Super Bowl XXV champion	
Rayford Cooks	Zeta Beta	Professional football player with the Houston Oilers	
Will Corbin	Alpha Alpha Rho	Professional football player with the Washington Valor and Atlanta Legends; 2018 ArenaBowl champion	
Edawn Coughman	Iota	Professional football player with the Toronto Argonauts	
Jermaine Cunningham	Zeta Kappa	Professional football player with the New England Patriots, San Francisco 49ers, and New York Jets; Member of the championship 2006 and 2008 Florida Gators football team	
DeMarcus Curry	Kappa Zeta	Professional football player with the Tampa Bay Buccaneers	
Eric Curry	Theta Delta	Professional football player with the Tampa Bay Buccaneers and Jacksonville Jaguars; played on the national champion 1992 Alabama Crimson Tide football team	
Lional Dalton	Zeta Epsilon	Professional football player; Super Bowl XXXV champion	
Clem Daniels	Alpha Nu Sigma	Professional football player with the Dallas Texans, Oakland Raiders, and San Francisco 49ers; 1967 AFL champion & 1963 AFL Most Valuable Player, AFL All-Time Team	
Stanley Daniels	Kappa Lambda	Professional football player with the Denver Broncos	
Isaac Davis	Kappa Upsilon	Professional football player with the San Diego Chargers, New Orleans Saints, and Minnesota Vikings	
Wayne Davis	Zeta Psi	Professional football player with the San Diego Chargers, Buffalo Bills, and Washington Redskins	
Willie Davis	Iota Pi	Professional football player with the Kansas City Chiefs and Houston Oilers; Champion of Super Bowl LIV, LVII, and LVIII as an executive	
Floyd Dixon	Epsilon Upsilon	Professional football player with the Atlanta Falcons and Philadelphia Eagles	
DeWayne Dotson	Kappa Chi	Professional football player with the Miami Dolphins	
Hugh Douglas	Nu Sigma	Professional football player with the New York Jets, Philadelphia Eagles, and Jacksonville Jaguars	
Marques Douglas	Alpha	Professional football player with the Baltimore Ravens, New Orleans Saints, San Francisco 49ers, and New York Jets	
Braylon Edwards	Gamma Alpha Sigma	Professional football player with the New York Jets, 2008 Pro Bowl, and winner of the Fred Biletnikoff Award	
Robert Edwards	Zeta Nu	Professional football player with the New England Patriots and Miami Dolphins	
Terrence Edwards	Zeta Nu	Professional football player with the Atlanta Falcons	
Donnie Elder	Delta Nu	Professional football player with the New York Jets, Detroit Lions, Tampa Bay Buccaneers, and San Diego Chargers	
Amod Field	Kappa Epsilon	Professional football player with the Phoenix Cardinals; also played in the Arena Football League, 1993 ArenaBowl champion	
Earnest Fields	Kappa Chi	Professional football player with the Nashville Kats	
Anthony Fieldings	Kappa Psi	Professional football player with the Dallas Cowboys	
Henry Ford	Kappa Upsilon	Professional football player with the Houston Oilers / Tennessee Oilers / Tennessee Titans and New Orleans Saints	
John Ford	Zeta Eta	Professional football player with the Detroit Lions; 1984 ACC Rookie of the Year	
Kavon Frazier	Lambda Gamma	Professional football player with the Dallas Cowboys, Miami Dolphins, and Las Vegas Raiders	
Harry Galbreath	Kappa Chi	Professional football player with the Miami Dolphins, Green Bay Packers, and the New York Jets	
Rashan Gary	Delta Rho	Professional football player with the Green Bay Packers and the Dallas Cowboys	
Adam Gettis	Kappa Psi	Professional football player with the Washington Redskins, New York Giants, and Tampa Bay Buccaneers	
Tony Gilbert	Zeta Nu	Professional football player with the Arizona Cardinals, Jacksonville Jaguars, and Atlanta Falcons	
Ernest Grant	Beta Theta	Professional football player with the Miami Dolphins and Chicago Bears	
Victor Green	Iota Beta	Professional football player with the New York Jets, New England Patriots, and New Orleans Saints	
L. C. Greenwood	Beta Theta	Professional football player with the Pittsburgh Steelers; Super Bowl IX, X, XIII, and XIV champion	
Terry Greer	Gamma Beta	Professional football player with the Toronto Argonauts, Cleveland Browns, San Francisco 49ers, and Detroit Lions; Super Bowl XIII and XXIV champion; 1983 Grey Cup champion, Canadian Football Hall of Fame	
Dudley Guice Jr.	Zeta Iota	Professional football player with the Tennessee Titans	
Jeff Gunter	Beta Beta Iota	Professional football player with the Cincinnati Bengals	
Myron Guyton	Iota Delta	Professional football player with the New York Giants and New England Patriots; Super Bowl XXV champion	
Darryl Hardy	Kappa Chi	Professional football player with the Arizona Cardinals, Dallas Cowboys, and Seattle Seahawks; Super Bowl XXX champion	
Chris Harris	Kappa Kappa	Professional football player with the Chicago Bears and Carolina Panthers	
Corey Alan Harris	Beta Beta Alpha	Professional football player with the New Orleans Saints and Kansas City Chiefs	
Elroy Harris	Iota Delta	Professional football player with the Seattle Seahawks	
Chris Hayes	Alpha Beta Alpha	Professional football player with the Green Bay Packers, New York Jets, and New England Patriots; Super Bowl XXXI champion	
Verron Haynes	Zeta Nu	Professional football player with the Atlanta Falcons and Pittsburgh Steelers; Super Bowl XL Champion	
Jamie Henderson	Delta Mu Sigma	Professional football player with the New York Jets	
Aldi Henry	Delta Kappa	Professional football player with the Calgary Stampeders; 2x Grey Cup champion (1998, 2001)	
Mark Hicks	Lambda Xi	Professional football player with the Seattle Seahawks and Detroit Lions	
Karan Higdon	Delta Rho	Professional football player with the Houston Texans	
Walter Highsmith	Alpha Beta Sigma	Professional football player with the Denver Broncos, Montreal Alouettes, Houston Oilers, Memphis Southmen, and Toronto Argonauts; Head football coach for Texas Southern University	
Bobby Howard	Epsilon Iota	Professional football player with the Tampa Bay Buccaneers	
Claude Humphrey	Zeta Alpha	Professional football player with the Atlanta Falcons and Philadelphia Eagles; six-time Pro Bowl; Pro Football Hall of Fame	
Maurice Hurst Sr.	Rho	Professional football player with the New England Patriots	
Donald Igwebuike	Omicron Lambda	Professional football player with the Tampa Bay Buccaneers and the Minnesota Vikings, played on the championship 1981 Clemson Tigers football team	
Ken Irvin	Delta Nu	Professional football player with the Buffalo Bills, New Orleans Saints, and Minnesota Vikings	
Mark Jackson	Zeta Phi	Professional football player with the Denver Broncos, New York Giants, and Indianapolis Colts	
Marlion Jackson	Iota Epsilon	Professional football player with the New York Jets and Atlanta Falcons	
A.J. Johnson	Pi Xi	Professional football player with the Washington Redskins and San Diego Chargers; Super Bowl XXVI champion	
Corey Johnson	Zeta Nu	Professional football player in the Arena Football League	
Darrius Johnson	Xi Delta	Professional football player with the Denver Broncos and Kansas City Chiefs; Super Bowl XXXII and XXXIII champion	
Dennis Johnson	Theta Iota	Professional football player with the Buffalo Bills and New York Giants	
Mario Johnson	Eta Gamma	Professional football player with the New York Jets and New England Patriots	
Aaron Jones	Iota Delta	Professional football player with the Pittsburgh Steelers, New England Patriots, and Miami Dolphins	
Fredrick Jones	Mu Epsilon	Professional football player with the Kansas City Chiefs	
Tevin Jones	Delta Nu	Professional football player with the Pittsburgh Steelers, Saskatchewan Roughriders, Edmonton Elks, and Calgary Stampeders	
Jarmar Julien	Mu Lambda	Professional football player with the Kansas City Chiefs	
Steven Jyles	Kappa Kappa	Professional football player with the Edmonton Eskimos, Saskatchewan Roughriders, Winnipeg Blue Bombers, and Toronto Argonauts	
Tim Kearse	Mu Lambda	Professional football player with the Detroit Lions and Indianapolis Colts	
Bo Kelly	Eta Zeta	Professional football player with the Arizona Rattlers and Carolina Cobras; 1997 ArenaBowl champion	
Eddie Kennison	Iota Tau	Professional football player with the St. Louis Rams, New Orleans Saints, Chicago Bears, Denver Broncos, and Kansas City Chiefs	
Kyle Kitchens	Upsilon Beta Sigma	Professional football player in the European League of Football	
George Koonce	Honorary	Professional football player with the Green Bay Packers; Super Bowl XXXI champion	
Kendall Lamm	Alpha Alpha Rho	Professional football player with the Houston Texans, Cleveland Browns, Tennessee Titans, and Miami Dolphins	
Gregory Lee	Lambda Eta	Professional football player with the Pittsburgh Steelers	
Tim Lester	Iota Delta	Professional football player with the Los Angeles Rams, Pittsburgh Steelers, and Dallas Cowboys	
Jeremy Lincoln	Kappa Chi	Professional football player with the Chicago Bears, St. Louis Rams, Seattle Seahawks, New York Giants, and Detroit Lions	
Michael Lowery	Eta Beta	Professional football player with the Chicago Bears	
Ricky Lumpkin	Mu Theta	Professional football player with the Arizona Cardinals and Oakland Raiders	
Cecil Martin	Kappa Rho	Professional football player with the Philadelphia Eagles and Tampa Bay Buccaneers	
Damon Mason	Iota Iota	Professional football player in the Arena Football League; 2× ArenaBowl champion (1998, 2000)	
Aubrey Matthews	Zeta Phi	Professional football player with the Denver Broncos, New York Giants, and Indianapolis Colts	
Brett Maxie	Beta Delta	Professional football player with the New Orleans Saints, Atlanta Falcons, Carolina Panthers, and San Francisco 49ers	
Shadrick McAfee	Iota Pi	Professional football player of several professional leagues	
Jimmy McClain	Alpha Alpha Lambda	Professional football player with the Houston Texans and Jacksonville Jaguars	
Jake McCullough	Omicron Lambda	Professional football player with the Denver Broncos	
Ray McDonald	Zeta Kappa	Professional football player with the San Francisco 49ers; played on the championship 2006 Florida Gators football team	
Ray McElroy	Delta Chi	Professional football player with the Indianapolis Colts, Chicago Bears, and Detroit Lions	
Willis McGahee	Zeta Iota Sigma	Professional football player with the Buffalo Bills and Baltimore Ravens; played on championship 2001 Miami Hurricanes football team	
Ben McGee	Alpha Beta	Professional football player with the Pittsburgh Steelers	
Henry McMillian	Zeta Kappa	Professional football player with the Seattle Seahawks	
Darryl Meadows	Lambda Epsilon	Professional football player with the Houston Oilers	
Josh Metellus	Delta Rho	Professional football player with the Minnesota Vikings	
Arnold Mickens	Alpha Epsilon Alpha	Professional football player with the Indianapolis Colts	
Brandon Miller	Zeta Nu	Professional football player with the Atlanta Falcons and Seattle Seahawks	
Nate Miller	Iota Tau	Professional football player with the Atlanta Falcons	
Carlton Mitchell	Zeta Xi	Professional football player with the Cleveland Browns, Edmonton Eskimos, and Ottawa Redblacks	
Kyle Mitchell	Zeta Psi	Professional football player with the Saskatchewan Roughriders	
Michael Moore	Theta Delta	Professional football player with the Washington Redskins and Atlanta Falcons	
Lloyd Mumphord	Beta Delta	Professional football player with the Miami Dolphins and Baltimore Colts; Super Bowl VII and VIII champion	
Ikechuku Ndukwe	Iota Nu	Professional football player with the Washington Redskins, Baltimore Ravens, Miami Dolphins, Kansas City Chiefs, and San Diego Chargers	
Nate Newton	Alpha Eta	Professional football player with the Dallas Cowboys and Carolina Panthers; Super Bowl XXVII, XXVIII, and XXX champion; Black College Football Hall of Fame	
George Odum	Iota Pi	Professional football player with the Indianapolis Colts, San Francisco 49ers, and Houston Texans	
Michael Okwo	Beta Tau	Professional football player drafted by the Chicago Bears	
Christopher Owens	Mu Lambda	Professional football player with the Atlanta Falcons	
Jeff Owens	Zeta Nu	Professional football player with the Philadelphia Eagles	
Bubba Paris	Delta Rho	Professional football player with the San Francisco 49ers, Indianapolis Colts, and Detroit Lions; Super Bowl XIX, XXIII, and XXIV champion	
Chris Parker	Rho Upsilon	Professional football player with the Jacksonville Jaguars; Member of the championship 1992 Marshall Thundering Herd football team	
Jaret Patterson	Zeta Chi Sigma	Professional football player with the Washington Commanders and Los Angeles Chargers	
Marvcus Patton	Nu Delta	Professional football player with the Buffalo Bills, Washington Redskins, and the Kansas City Chiefs	
Corey Peters	Mu Theta	Professional football player with the Atlanta Falcons, Arizona Cardinals, and Jacksonville Jaguars	
Darius Phillips	Zeta Delta	Professional football player with the Cincinnati Bengals and Denver Broncos	
Joey Porter	Nu Xi	Professional football player with the Pittsburgh Steelers and the Miami Dolphins; four-time Pro Bowl and Super Bowl XL champion	
Travis Prentice	Omicron Xi	Professional football player with the Cleveland Browns, Minnesota Vikings, and Arizona Cardinals	
Julius Pruitt	Theta Alpha	Professional football player with the Miami Dolphins	
Teo Redding	Epsilon Phi	Professional football player with the Massachusetts / Orlando Pirates and Houston Gamblers	
Jerry Rice	Delta Phi	Professional football player with the San Francisco 49ers; Pro Football Hall of Fame, College Football Hall of Fame; Super Bowl XXIII, XXIV, and XXIX champion	
Daniel Richardson	Rho Sigma	College football player for Central Michigan, Florida Atlantic, and FAMU	
Tim Roberts	Theta Eta	Professional football player with the Houston Oilers and New England Patriots	
Dominique Rodgers-Cromartie	Eta Beta Sigma	Professional football player with the Arizona Cardinals, Philadelphia Eagles, Denver Broncos, New York Giants, Oakland Raiders, and Washington Redskins	
Adrian Ross	Nu Xi	Professional football player with the Cincinnati Bengals	
Dwayne Rudd	Theta Delta	Professional football player with the Minnesota Vikings, Cleveland Browns, and the Tampa Bay Buccaneers	
Leonard Russell	Lambda Xi	Professional football player with the New England Patriots, Denver Broncos, St. Louis Rams, and San Diego Chargers; 1991 NFL Offensive Rookie of the Year	
Blaine Saipaia	Nu Xi	Professional football player with the Oakland Raiders, St. Louis Rams, and Detroit Lions	
B.J. Sams	Xi Eta	Professional football player with the Baltimore Ravens and Kansas City Chiefs	
Leon Seals	Alpha Beta	Professional football player with the Buffalo Bills and Philadelphia Eagles	
Lache Seastrunk	Nu Zeta	Professional football player drafted by the Washington Redskins	
George Selvie	Zeta Xi	Professional football player with the Dallas Cowboys, St. Louis Rams, Carolina Panthers, Jacksonville Jaguars, and New York Giants	
Terrance Shaw	Epsilon Upsilon	Professional football player with the San Diego Chargers, Miami Dolphins, New England Patriots, and Oakland Raiders; Super Bowl XXXVI champion	
Elbert Shelley	Lambda Eta	Professional football player with the Atlanta Falcons	
Richard Sherman	Beta Tau	Professional football player with the Seattle Seahawks; five-time Pro Bowl and Super Bowl XLVIII champion	
DJ Shockley	Zeta Nu	Professional football player with the Atlanta Falcons	
Ron Simpkins	Delta Rho	Professional football player with the Cincinnati Bengals and Green Bay Packers	
Ryan Sims	Xi Gamma	Professional football player with the Kansas City Chiefs and Tampa Bay Buccaneers	
Jackie Slater	Alpha Beta	Professional football player with the Los Angeles Rams and the St. Louis Rams; Pro Football Hall of Fame	
Jessie Small	Nu Sigma	Professional football player with the Philadelphia Eagles	
Emmitt Smith	Zeta Kappa	Professional football player with the Dallas Cowboys and Arizona Cardinals; Pro Football Hall of Fame; College Football Hall of Fame; Super Bowl XXVII, XXVIII, and XXX champion; 2006 Dancing with the Stars champion	
Revie Sorey	Epsilon Xi	Professional football player with the Chicago Bears	
James Starks	Beta Iota	Professional football player with the Green Bay Packers; Super Bowl XLV champion	
John Stephens	Zeta Iota	Professional football player with the New England Patriots, Green Bay Packers, Atlanta Falcons, and Kansas City Chiefs	
Maurice Stovall	Gamma Eta Sigma	Professional football player with the Tampa Bay Buccaneers, Detroit Lions, and Jacksonville Jaguars	
Marcus Stroud	Zeta Nu	Professional football player with the Jacksonville Jaguars and Buffalo Bills	
Darrell Stuckey	Zeta Omicron	Professional football player with the San Diego Chargers	
Clarence Sutton	Alpha Alpha Rho	Professional football player with the Chicago Bears	
Chris Terry	Zeta Nu	Professional football player with the Carolina Panthers, Seattle Seahawks, and Kansas City Chiefs	
John Terry	Upsilon	Professional football player with the Toronto Argonauts and Saskatchewan Roughriders	
Fred Thomas	Kappa Omicron	Professional football player with the Seattle Seahawks and New Orleans Saints	
Kiwaukee Thomas	Pi Rho	Professional football player with the Jacksonville Jaguars, Miami Dolphins, and Buffalo Bills	
Marcus Thomas	Zeta Kappa	Professional football player with the Denver Broncos; played on the championship 2006 Florida Gators football team	
Marvin Thomas	Delta Nu	Professional football player with the Detroit Lions and Denver Broncos; Super Bowl XXXIII champion	
Michael Thomas	Beta Tau	Professional football player with the Miami Dolphins, New York Giants, Houston Texans, and Cincinnati Bengals	
George Thornton	Theta Delta	Professioanl football player with the San Diego Chargers and New York Giants	
Elijah Thurmon	Alpha	Professioanl football player player with the Philadelphia Eagles, Oakland Raiders, Saskatchewan Roughriders, Calgary Stampeders, and Montreal Alouettes	
Lewis Tillman	Alpha Beta	Professional football player with the New York Giants and Chicago Bears; Super Bowl XXV champion	
Willie Totten	Delta Phi	Professional football player with the Buffalo Bills; College Football Hall of Fame MVSU named Rice-Totten Stadium after him and fellow teammate and brother Jerry Rice.	
Deshea Townsend	Theta Delta	Professional football player with the Pittsburgh Steelers and Indianapolis Colts; Super Bowl XL and Super Bowl XLIII champion	
Tupo Tuupo	Alpha Beta Alpha	Professional football player with the San Jose SaberCats, Everett Hawks, and Stockton Lightning; 2004 ArenaBowl champion	
Tony Vinson	Theta Omicron	Professional football player with the Baltimore Ravens	
Rod Walker	Alpha Alpha Lambda	Professional football player with the Tennessee Titans and Green Bay Packers	
Tracey Walker	Iota Iota	Professional football player with the Detroit Lions	
Raymond Walls	Theta Eta	Professional football player with the Indianapolis Colts, Cleveland Browns, Baltimore Ravens, and Arizona Cardinals	
David Ward	Theta Nu	Professional football player with the Cincinnati Bengals and New England Patriots	
Hines Ward	Zeta Nu	Professional football player with the Pittsburgh Steelers; four-time Pro Bowl; Super Bowl XL (MVP) and Super Bowl XLIII champion	
James Washington	Kappa Delta Sigma	Professional football player with the Los Angeles Rams, Dallas Cowboys, and Washington Redskins; Super Bowl XXVII and Super Bowl XXVIII champion	
Orlando Watters	Kappa Upsilon	Professional football player with the Seattle Seahawks	
Larry Webster	Epsilon Psi	Professional football player with the Miami Dolphins, Cleveland Browns, Baltimore Ravens, and New York Jets; Super Bowl XXXV champion	
Reggie White	Eta	Professional football player with the San Diego Chargers and New England Patriots	
Reggie White Jr.	Iota Chi Sigma	Professional football player with the Montreal Alouettes; 2023 Grey Cup champion	
Tracy White	Alpha	Professional football player with the Seattle Seahawks, Jacksonville Jaguars, Green Bay Packers, Philadelphia Eagles, and New England Patriots	
Willie Whitehead	Kappa Zeta	Professional football player with the San Francisco 49ers and the New Orleans Saints	
Wilson Whitley	Zeta Zeta	Professional football player with the Cincinnati Bengals, 1976 Lombardi Award, and College Football Hall of Fame	
Paul Wiggins	Alpha Theta Alpha	Professional football player with the Pittsburgh Steelers and Washington Redskins	
Erik Williams	Nu	Professional football player with the Dallas Cowboys and Baltimore Ravens; four-time Pro Bowl; Super Bowl XXVII, XXVIII, and XXX champion	
Javarris Williams	Zeta Alpha	Professional football player with the Kansas City Chiefs	
Todd Williams	Mu Epsilon	Professional football player with the Tennessee Titans; played for the championship 1999 Florida State Seminoles football team	
Tony Williams	Delta Nu	Professional football player with the Minnesota Vikings, Cincinnati Bengals, Jacksonville Jaguars	
Willie Williams	Pi Mu	Professional football player with the Pittsburgh Steelers and Seattle Seahawks; Super Bowl XL champion	
Tim Wilson	Epsilon Psi	Professional football player with the Houston Oilers and New Orleans Saints	
Josh Woods	Epsilon Psi	Professional football player with the Chicago Bears, Detroit Lions, Arizona Cardinals, and Atlanta Falcons	
Craig Yeast	Mu Theta	Professional football player with the Cincinnati Bengals and the New York Jets	

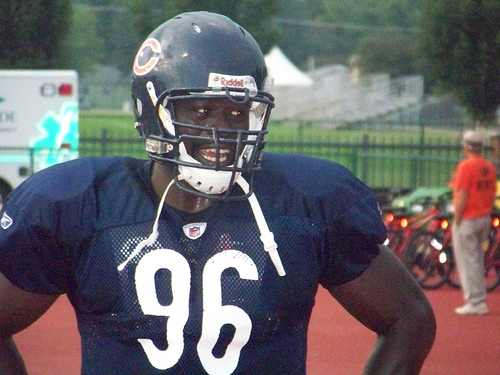
Alex Brown

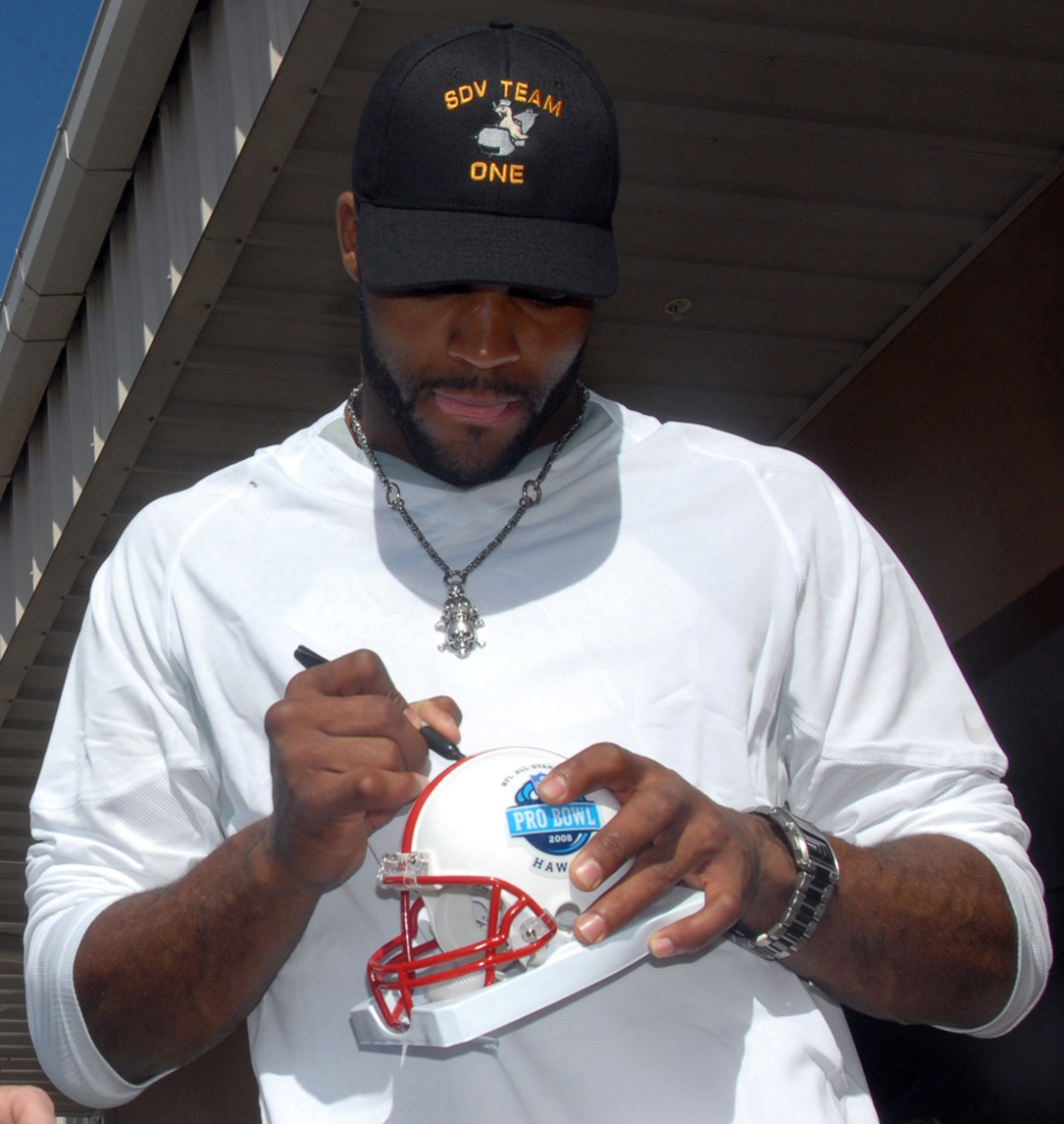
Braylon Edwards

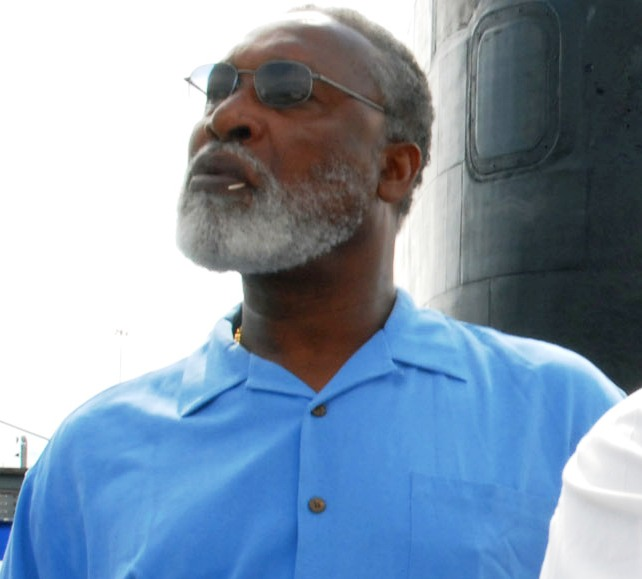
L. C. Greenwood

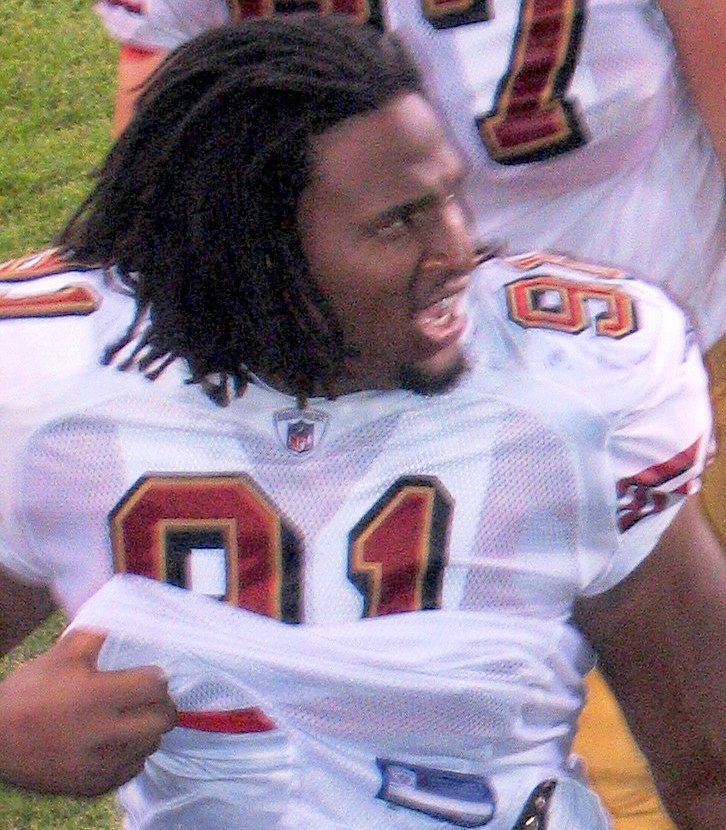
Ray McDonald

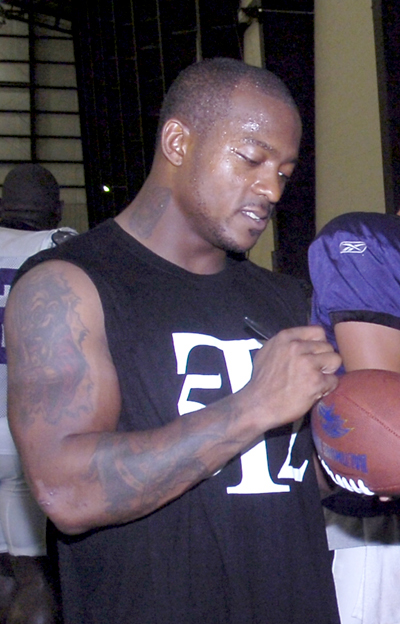
Willis McGahee

Bubba Paris

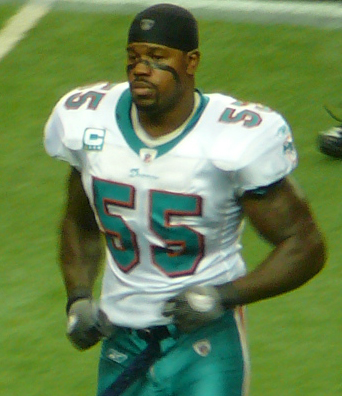
Joey Porter

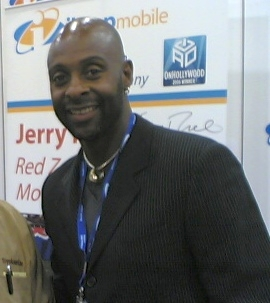
Jerry Rice

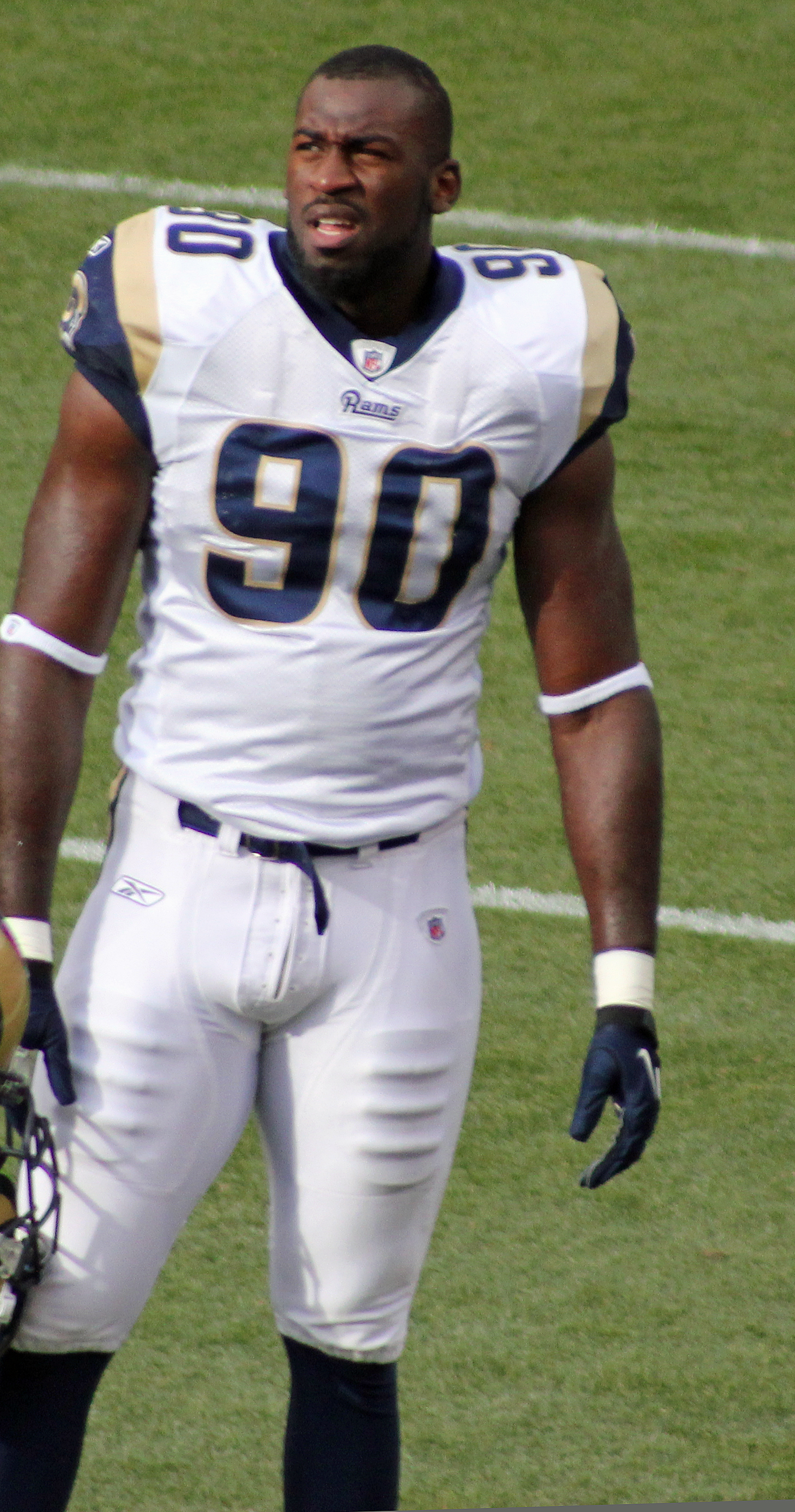
George Selvie

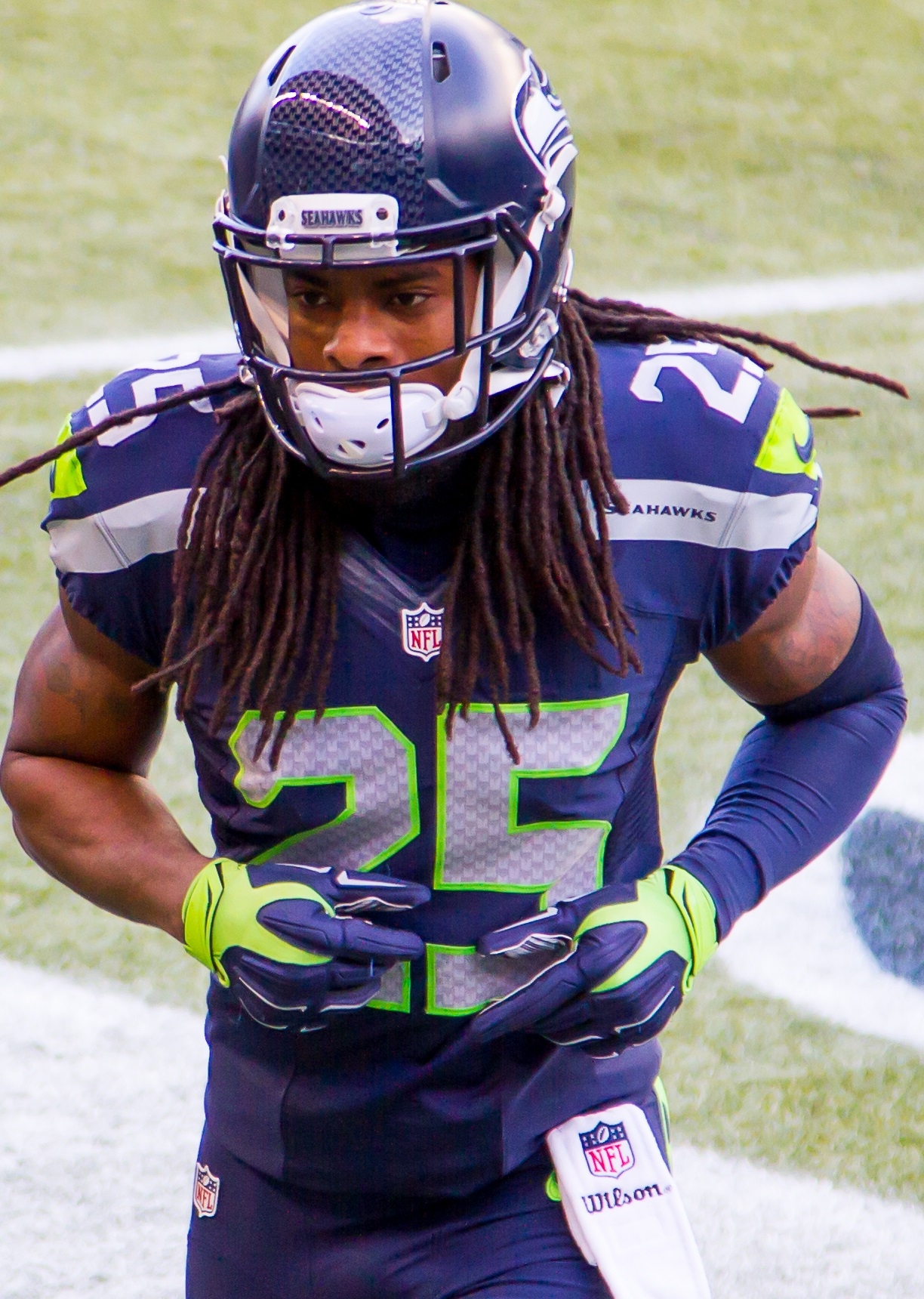
Richard Sherman

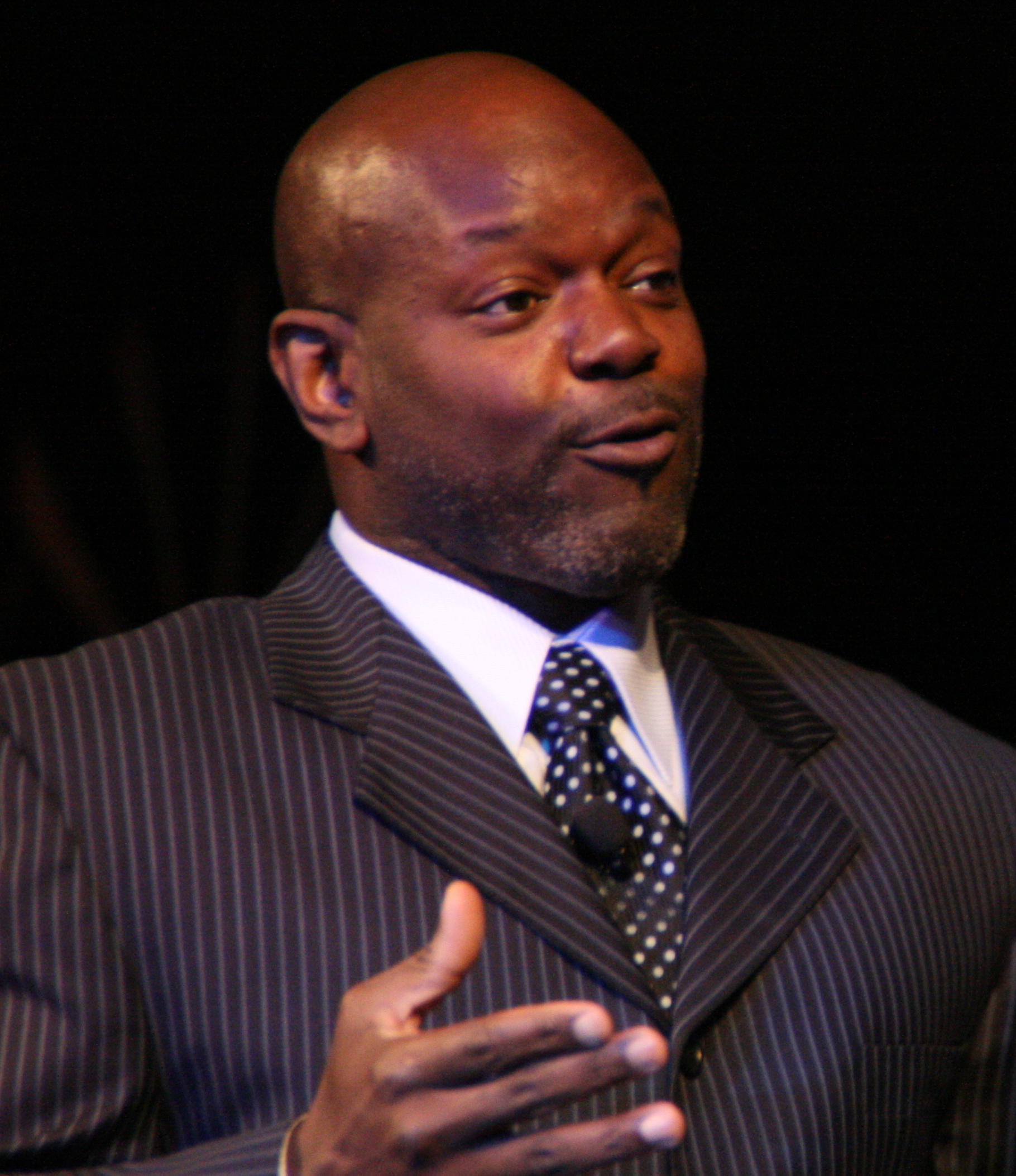
Emmitt Smith

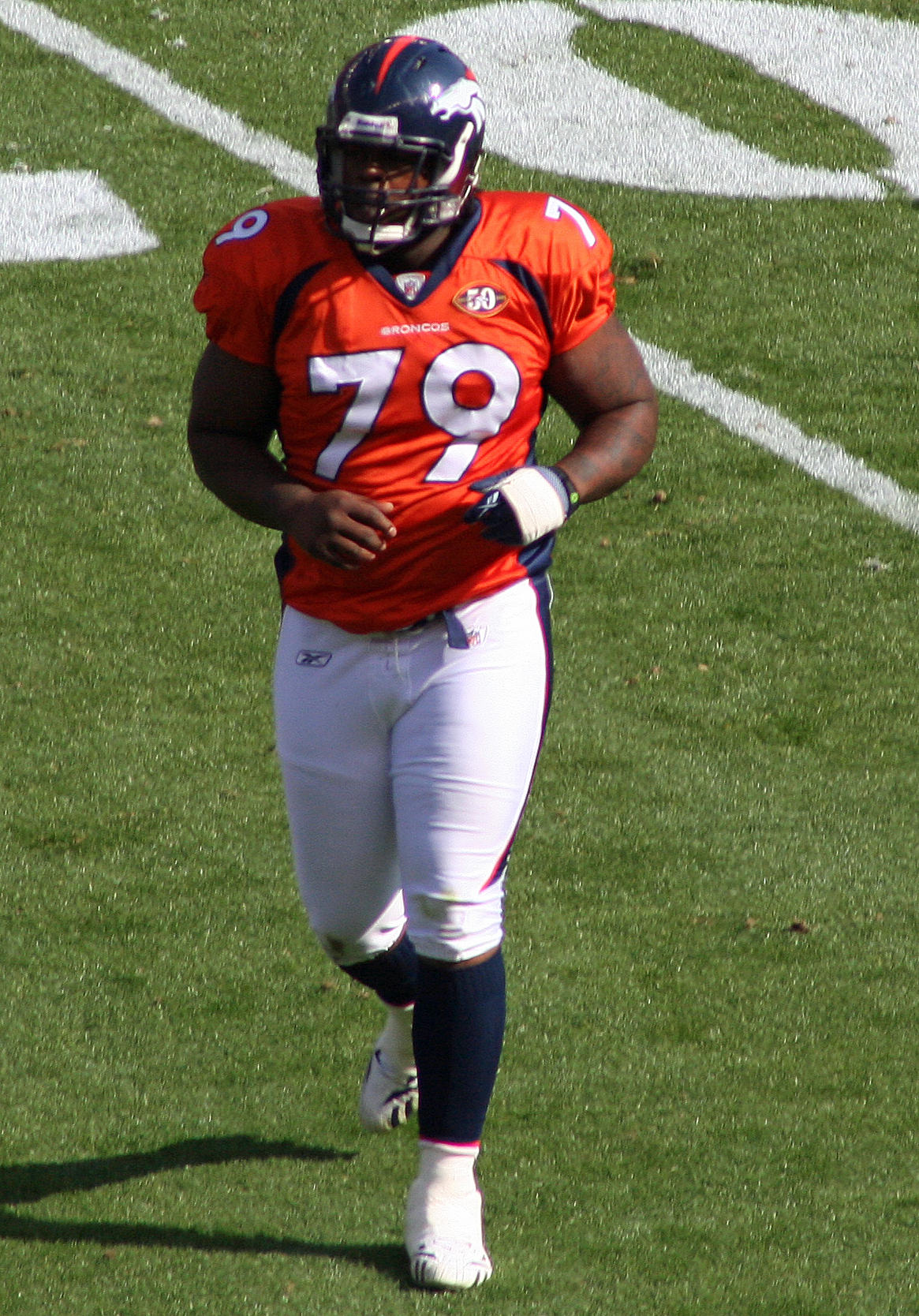
Marcus Thomas

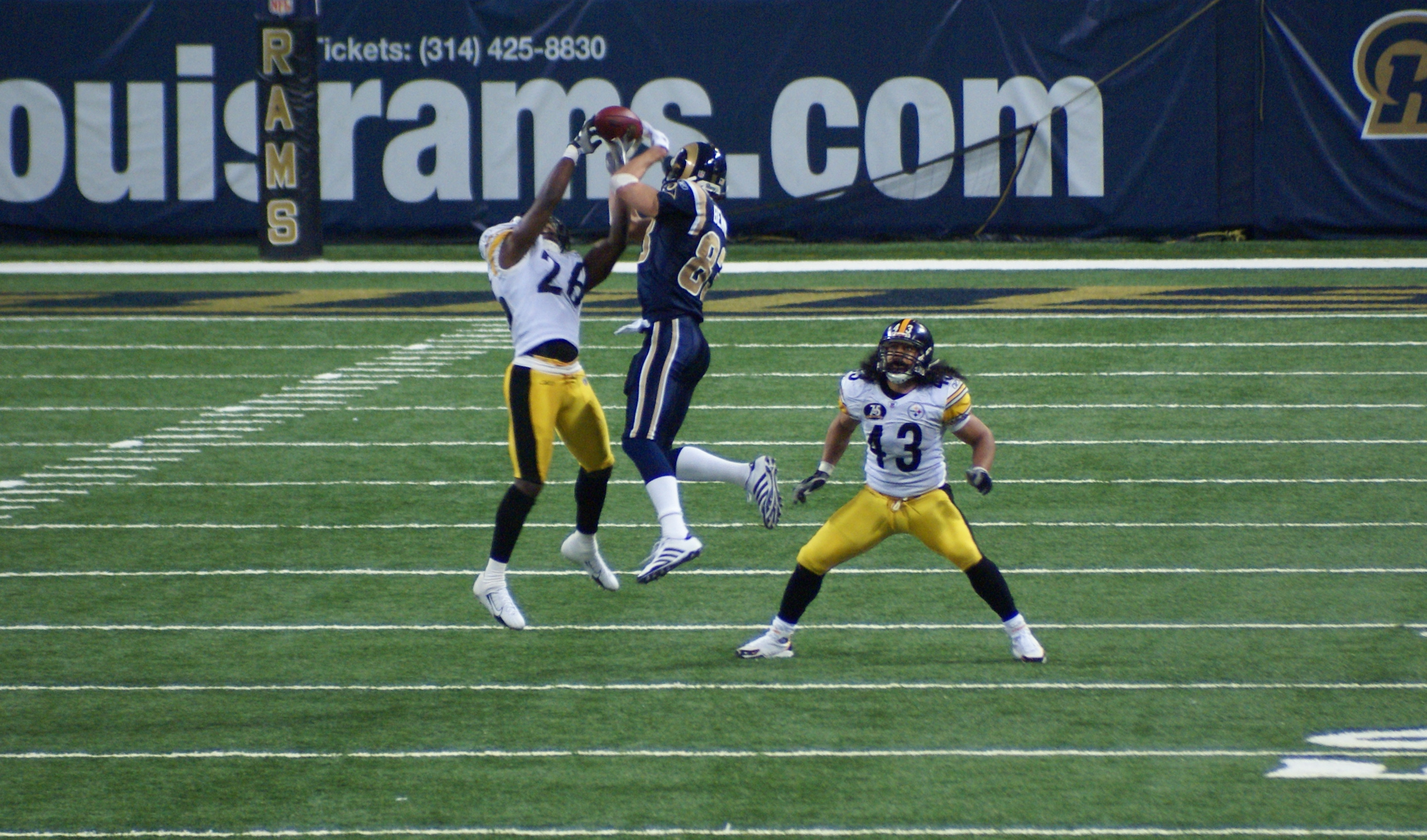
Deshea Townsend

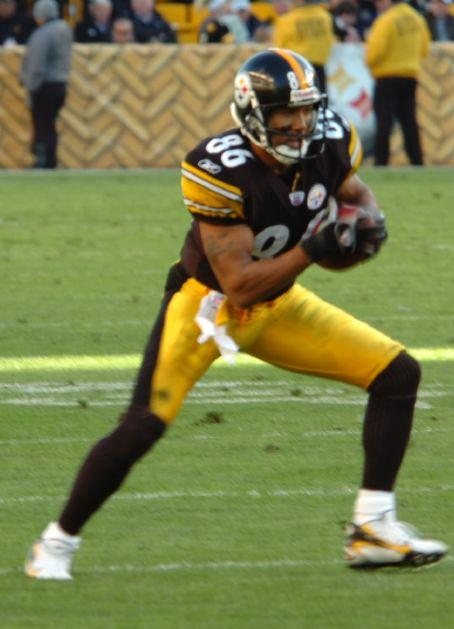
Hines Ward

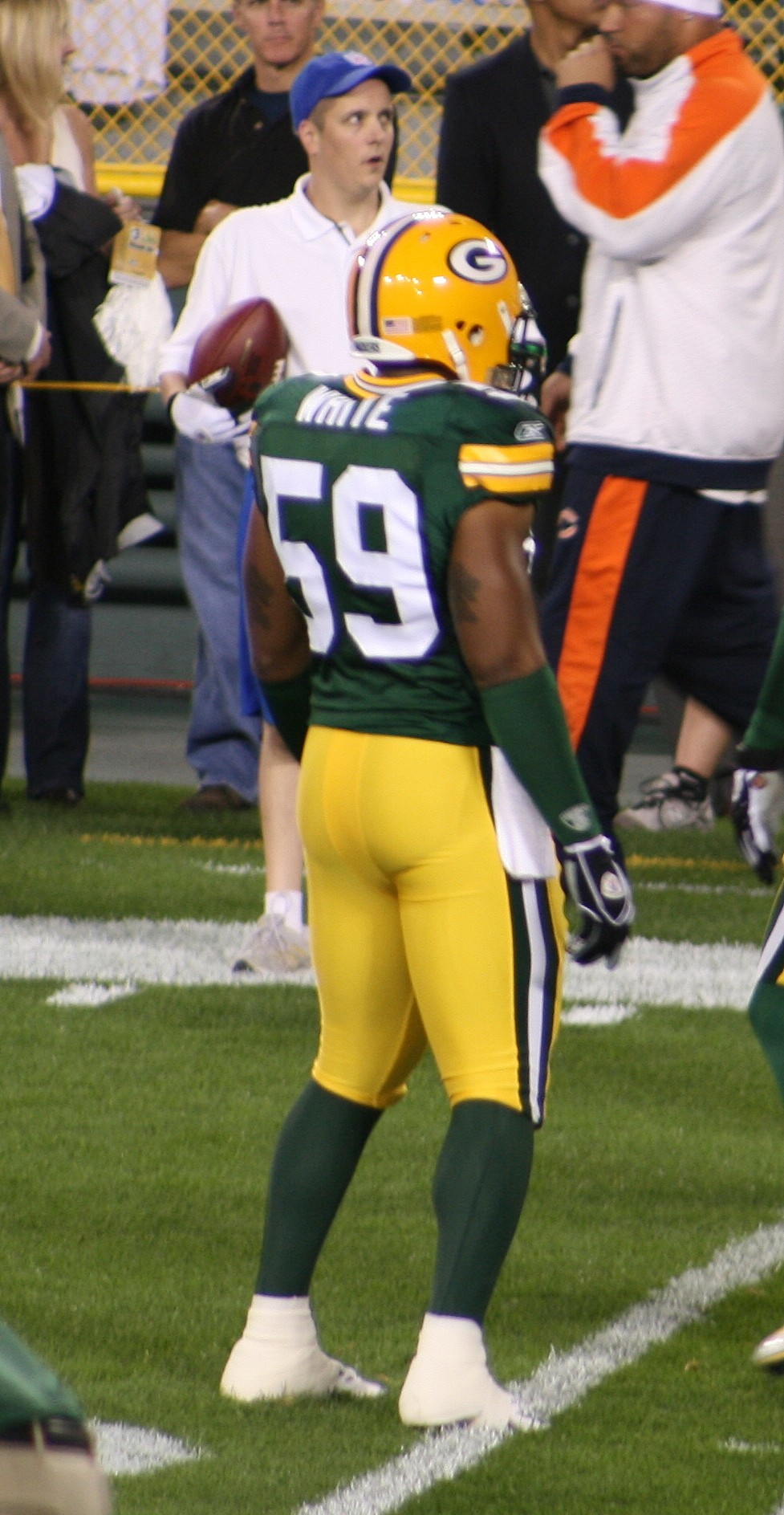
Tracy White

=== Baseball ===
Name	Original chapter	Notability	Ref.
Jason Boyd	Epsilon Lambda Sigma	Professional baseball player with the Pittsburgh Pirates, Philadelphia Phillies, San Diego Padres, and Cleveland Indians	
Lou Brock	Rho	Professional baseball player with the Chicago Cubs and St. Louis Cardinals; Baseball Hall of Fame; 1964 World Series and 1967 World Series champion	
Wayne Gomes	Omicron Iota	Professional baseball player with the Philadelphia Phillies, San Francisco Giants, and Boston Red Sox	
Ryan Howard	Rho Chi	Professional baseball player with the Philadelphia Phillies; 2008 World Series champion	
Tony Reagins	Theta Upsilon	General Manager of the Los Angeles Angels of Anaheim	

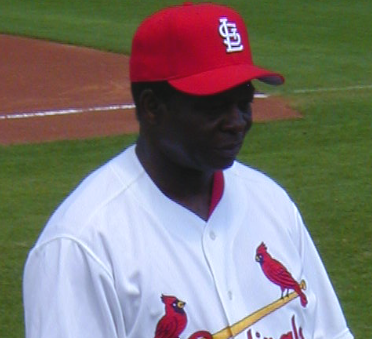
Lou Brock

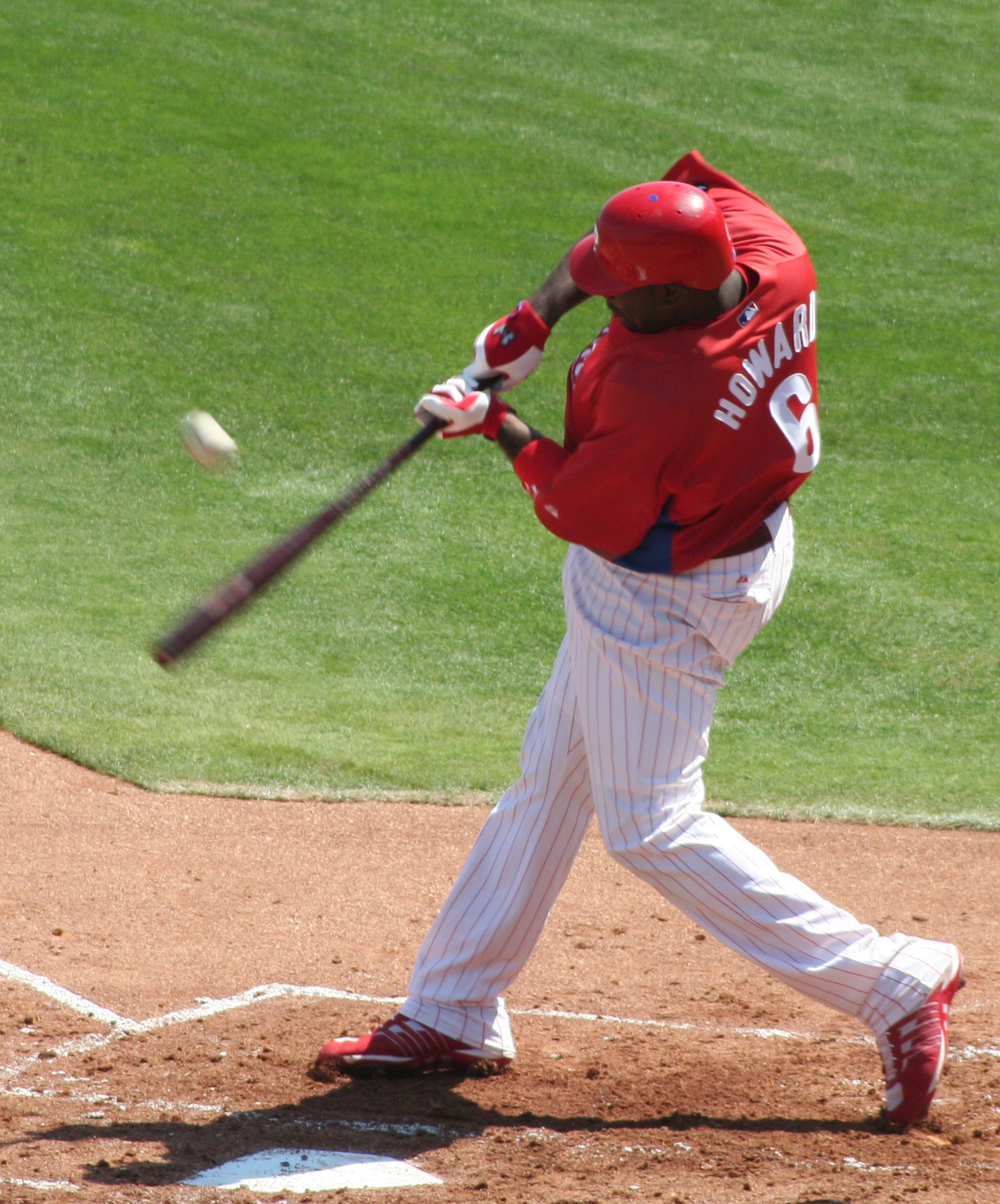
Ryan Howard

=== Basketball ===
Name	Original chapter	Notability	Ref.
Arthur Agee	Lambda Eta	Professional basketball player with the Winnipeg Cyclone, subject of the 1994 documentary Hoop Dreams	
William Bedford	Delta Nu	Professional basketball player with the Phoenix Suns, Detroit Pistons, and San Antonio Spurs; 1990 NBA Champion	
Jalen Billups	Eta Alpha Sigma	Professional basketball player in Australia, Scotland, New Zealand, and Japan; 2018 SBL MVP	
Chucky Brown	Xi Zeta	Professional basketball player with the Cleveland Cavaliers, Los Angeles Lakers, New Jersey Nets, Grand Rapids Hoops, Houston Rockets, Milwaukee Bucks, Atlanta Hawks, and San Antonio Spurs ; 1995 NBA champion	
Wayne Chism	Kappa Chi	Professional basketball player in Bahrain, France, Hungary, Israel, Mexico, the Philippines, and Turkey	
George Conditt IV	Kappa Gamma	Professional basketball player in Puerto Rico, Greece, and Spain; 2024 Summer Olympian	
Eugene Edgerson	Alpha Alpha Epsilon	Member of the Harlem Globetrotters, played on 1997 National Champion Arizona Wildcats team	
Tony Fairley	Pi Iota	Player with Charleston Southern Buccaneers men's basketball	
Lester Fonville	Alpha Beta	Professional basketball player with the Mississippi Jets and Wichita Falls Texans	
Gerald Glass	Xi Beta	Professional basketball player with the Minnesota Timberwolves, Detroit Pistons, New Jersey Nets, and Charlotte Hornets	
Greg Graham	Epsilon Iota	Professional basektball player with the Philadelphia 76ers, Seattle SuperSonics, and Cleveland Cavaliers	
Bryce Harris (basketball)	Alpha	College basketball player; 2026 Mid-Eastern Athletic Conference Men's Basketball Player of the Year	
Les Hunter	Alpha Delta Sigma	professional basketball player with the Baltimore Bullets, Minnesota Muskies, Miami Floridians, New York Nets, Kentucky Colonels, and Memphis Tams; Member of the championship 1962–63 Loyola Ramblers men's basketball team; College Basketball Hall of Fame	
Isaiah Joe	Kappa Upsilon	Professional basketball player with the Oklahoma City Thunder and Detroit Pistons; 2025 NBA Champion	
Aaron Lucas	Kappa Iota	Professional basketball player in Lithuania, Israel, France, Turkey, and Ukraine	
Chris McNealy	Mu Lambda	Professional basketball player with the New York Knicks	
Conrad McRae	Theta Xi	Professional basketball player in Turkey, France, Italy, and Greece	
Todd Mitchell	Zeta Phi	Professional basketball player with the Miami Heat and San Antonio Spurs	
Tony Mitchell	Zeta Beta	Professional basketball player with the Detroit Pistons	
Olden Polynice	Zeta Eta	Professional basketball player with the Seattle SuperSonics, Los Angeles Clippers, Detroit Pistons, Sacramento Kings, and Utah Jazz	
Willis Reed	Xi	Professional basketball player with the New York Knicks; Basketball Hall of Fame and National Collegiate Basketball Hall of Fame; 1970 NBA Most Valuable Player Award, two-time NBA Champion, and NBA Finals Most Valuable Player (1970 and 1973)	
Aaron Swinson	Kappa Zeta	Professional basketball player with the Phoenix Suns	
Obie Trotter	Gamma Epsilon	Professional basketball player in Europe, 2005 Southwestern Athletic Conference Men's Basketball Player of the Year	
Darnell Valentine	Zeta Omicron	Professional basketball player with the Portland Trail Blazers, Los Angeles Clippers, and Cleveland Cavaliers; 1980 Summer Olympics	
Jay Vincent	Delta Kappa	Professional basketball player with the Dallas Mavericks, Washington Bullets, Denver Nuggets, San Antonio Spurs, Philadelphia 76ers, and Los Angeles Lakers; member of the championship 1978–79 Michigan State Spartans men's basketball team	
Sam Vincent	Delta Kappa	Professional basketball player with the Boston Celtics, Seattle SuperSonics, Chicago Bulls, and Orlando Magic; 1986 NBA champion; basketball coach for the NBA D-League and internationally in Europe and Africa	
Ronnie Williams	Zeta Kappa	Professional basketball player drafted by the Boston Celtics; played in the CBA	
Avis Wyatt	Alpha Alpha Alpha	Professional basketball player in the Netherlands, Cyprus, and Greece	

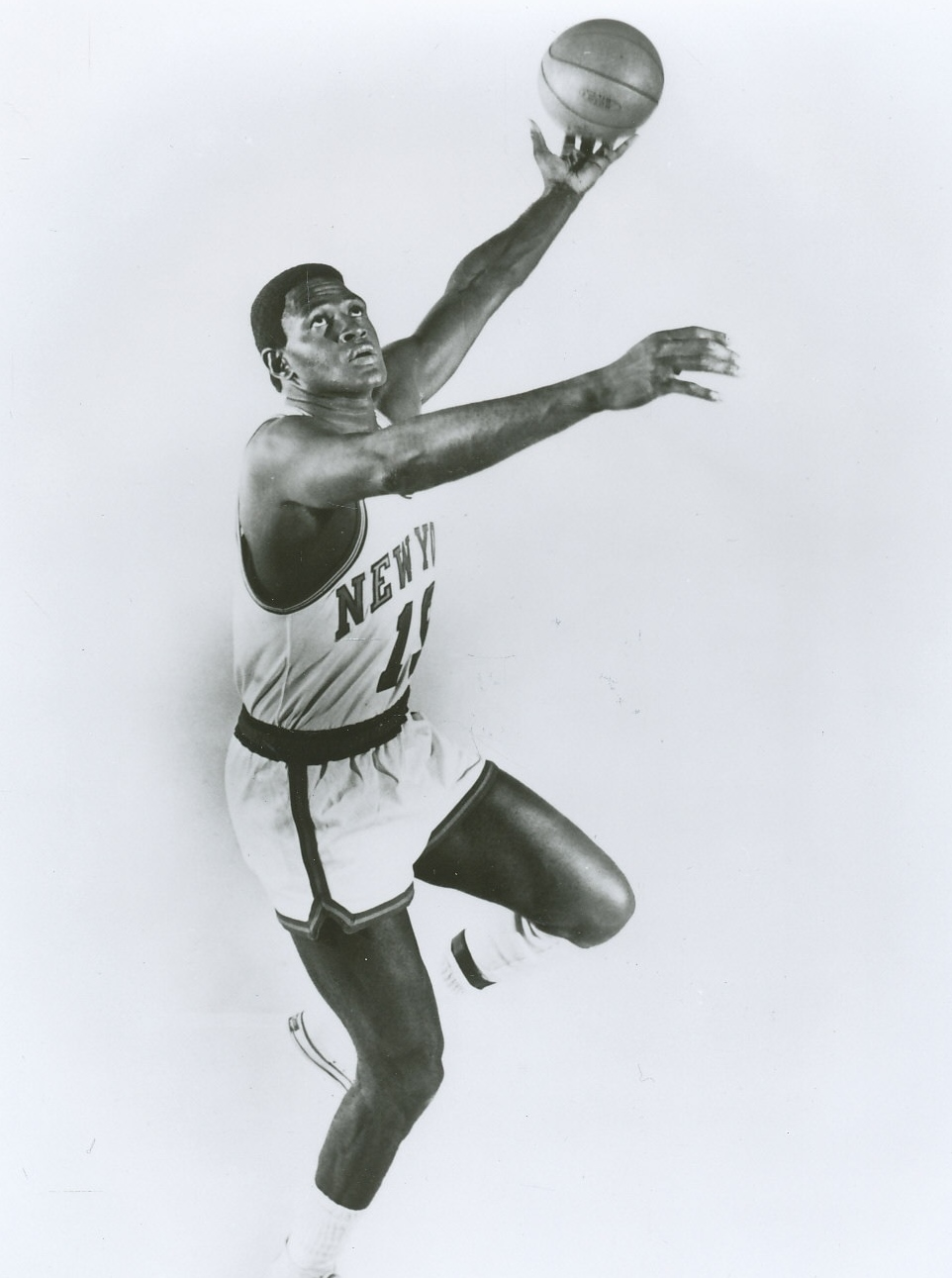
Willis Reed

=== Track and field ===
Name	Original chapter	Notability	Ref.
Dominique Arnold	Alpha Beta Alpha	Hurdling; Bronze medalist in the 2006 World Indoor Championships 60 m hurdles; Held a former American record for the fastest 110 m hurdler with 12.90 s (+1.1 m/s)	
Charles Austin	Pi Xi	High jumper; Gold medalist in the 1996 Summer Olympics, Olympic record of 2.39 metres; Gold medalist in the 1991 World Championships	
Tony Barton	Rho Tau	High jumper; Bronze medalist in the 1995 World Indoor Championships; Gold medalist in the 1993 Summer Universiade	
Kenta Bell	Zeta Iota	Triple jumper; Gold medalist in the 2001 Summer Universiade; Competed in the 2004 Summer Olympics and 2008 Summer Olympics	
Bradley Cooper	Mu Epsilon	Discus thrower and shot putter; Competed in the 1984 Summer Olympics (flag bearer) and 1988 Summer Olympics for the Bahamas	
Walter Dix	Mu Epsilon	Sprinter; Bronze medalist at 2008 Summer Olympics in the 100m and 200m; eight-time NCAA champion, fifteen-time All-American	
Victor Edet	Eta Gamma	Sprinter; Competed in the 1988 Summer Olympics for Nigeria; Gold medalist in the 4×100 m relay and bronze medalist in the 100 m of the 1985 African Championships	
Johnny Gray	Nu Delta	Runner; Bronze medalist at 1992 Summer Olympics in the 800 metres; Competed in the 1984 Summer Olympics, 1988 Summer Olympics, and 1996 Summer Olympics; Gold medalist at the 1987 Pan American Games and 1999 Pan American Games; National Track & Field Hall of Fame	
Alvin Haynes	Eta Beta	Triple jumper; Competed in the 1992 Summer Olympics for Barbados	
Craig Hepburn	Kappa Zeta	Long jumper; Competed in the 1992 Summer Olympics for the Bahamas; Gold medalist in the 1999 CAC Championships	
Chidi Imoh	Eta Gamma	Sprinter; Silver medalist in the 1992 Summer Olympics 4 × 100 m relay for Nigeria; 5× Gold medalist in the African Championships	
Al Joyner	Lambda Eta	1984 Summer Olympics gold medalist in the triple jump; 1984 Jim Thorpe Award winner	
Emmit King	Theta Delta	Sprinter;Two-time medalist at the 1983 World Track Championships; 1984 Summer Olympics, 1988 Summer Olympics; 1983 NCAA 100m National Champion	
Eddie Lovett	Zeta Kappa	Sprinter; Competed in the 2016 Summer Olympics and 2020 Summer Olympics for the 110 metres hurdles	
Tom McCants	Theta Delta	High jumper; Former American record holder in the high jump, set at the 1985 NCAA Division I Outdoor Track and Field Championships	
Nathaniel McKinney	Beta Xi	Competed in the 2004 Summer Olympics 4 × 400 m relay for the Bahamas; Silver Medalist in the 2005 World Championships & Bronze in the 2003 World Championships; Gold Medalist in the 2007 Pan American Games	
Coby Miller	Kappa Zeta	Silver medalist in the 2004 Summer Olympics for the 4 × 400 m relay; 2000 Summer Olympics	
Renaldo Nehemiah	Epsilon Psi	Hurdler; Former world record holder in 110m hurdles; first man to run 110m high hurdles in under 13 seconds; three-time NCAA champion and 1979 ACC Athlete of the Year; Professional football player with the San Francisco 49ers and Super Bowl XIX champion	
Fred Newhouse	Alpha Beta Sigma	Sprinter; Gold Medalist in the 4 × 400 m relay and silver medalist in the 400 m in the 1976 Summer Olympics	
Jamial Rolle	Rho Chi	Sprinter; Competed in the 2008 Summer Olympics and 2016 Summer Olympics for the Bahamas; Gold Medalist in the 4×100 m relay for the 2001 CAC Championships and 2013 CAC Championships	
Charles Simpkins	Pi Iota	Triple jumper; Silver medalist in the 1992 Summer Olympics; Gold medalist in the 1985 and 1987 Summer Universiade	
LaMont Smith	Zeta Zeta	1996 Summer Olympics Gold Medalist in the 4 × 400 m relay	
John Tillman	Kappa Chi	Triple jumper; Competed in the 1992 Summer Olympics	
Andrew Valmon	Theta Tau Sigma	2× Gold medalist in the 1988 Summer Olympics and 1992 Summer Olympics 4 × 400 m relay	
Clive Wright	Theta Delta	Represented Jamaica in the 1988 Summer Olympics for the 200-m and 4 × 100 m relay and the 1992 Olympics; 1990 NCAA Outdoor 4× 100 meter relay National Champion	

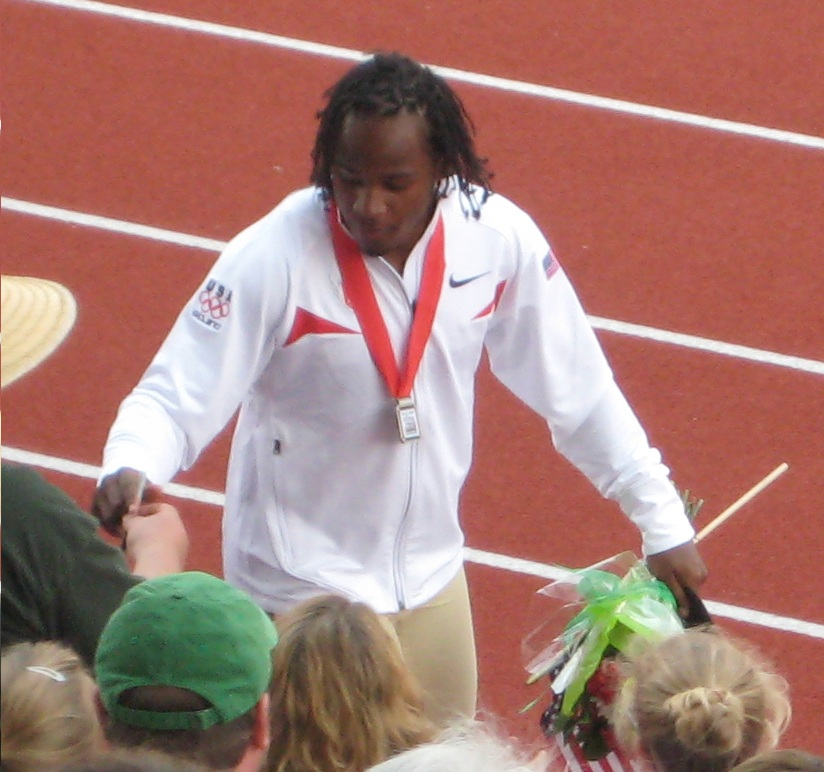
Walter Dix

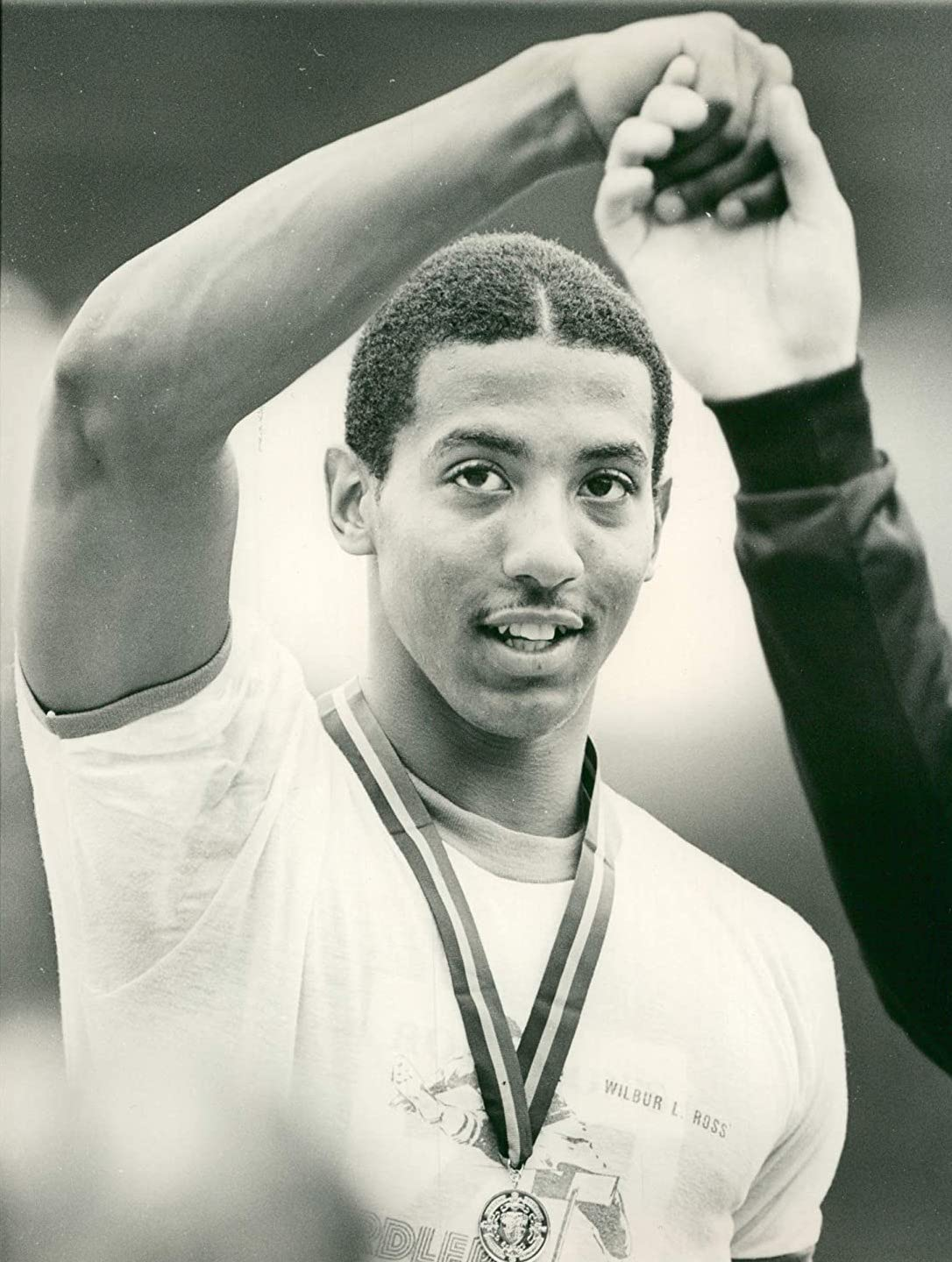
Renaldo Nehemiah

=== Other sports ===
Name	Original chapter	Notability	Ref.
Steven Aimable	Gamma Alpha Delta	Swimmer; 2020 Summer Olympics, men's 100 metre butterfly; Bronze medalist in 2023 African Games (50m backstroke)	
Sam Belnavis	Iota Delta Sigma	NASCAR team owner of BelCar Motorsports; Head of the RFK Racing driver diversity program	
Shawn Dean	Alpha Alpha Beta	Professional wrestler for All Elite Wrestling, Former ROH World Six-Man Tag Team Champion	
James Lee Johnson	Mu Theta	Greco-Roman wrestler; Silver medalist in the 1991 Pan American Games (100 kg); National Wrestling Hall of Fame	
Frank Trigg	Xi Delta	Mixed martial artist, UFC Hall of Fame	
Sesugh Uhaa	Kappa Zeta	WWE wrestler; "Apollo Crews"	
Charles Williams	Zeta Theta	Professional ice hockey player with the Manchester Monarchs, Ontario Reign, Indy Fuel, Rochester Americans, and Jacksonville Icemen	

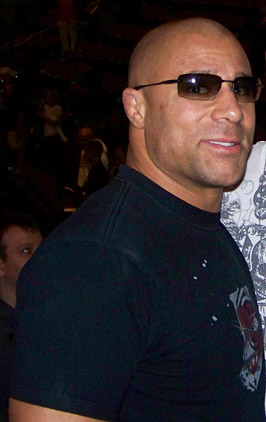
Frank Trigg

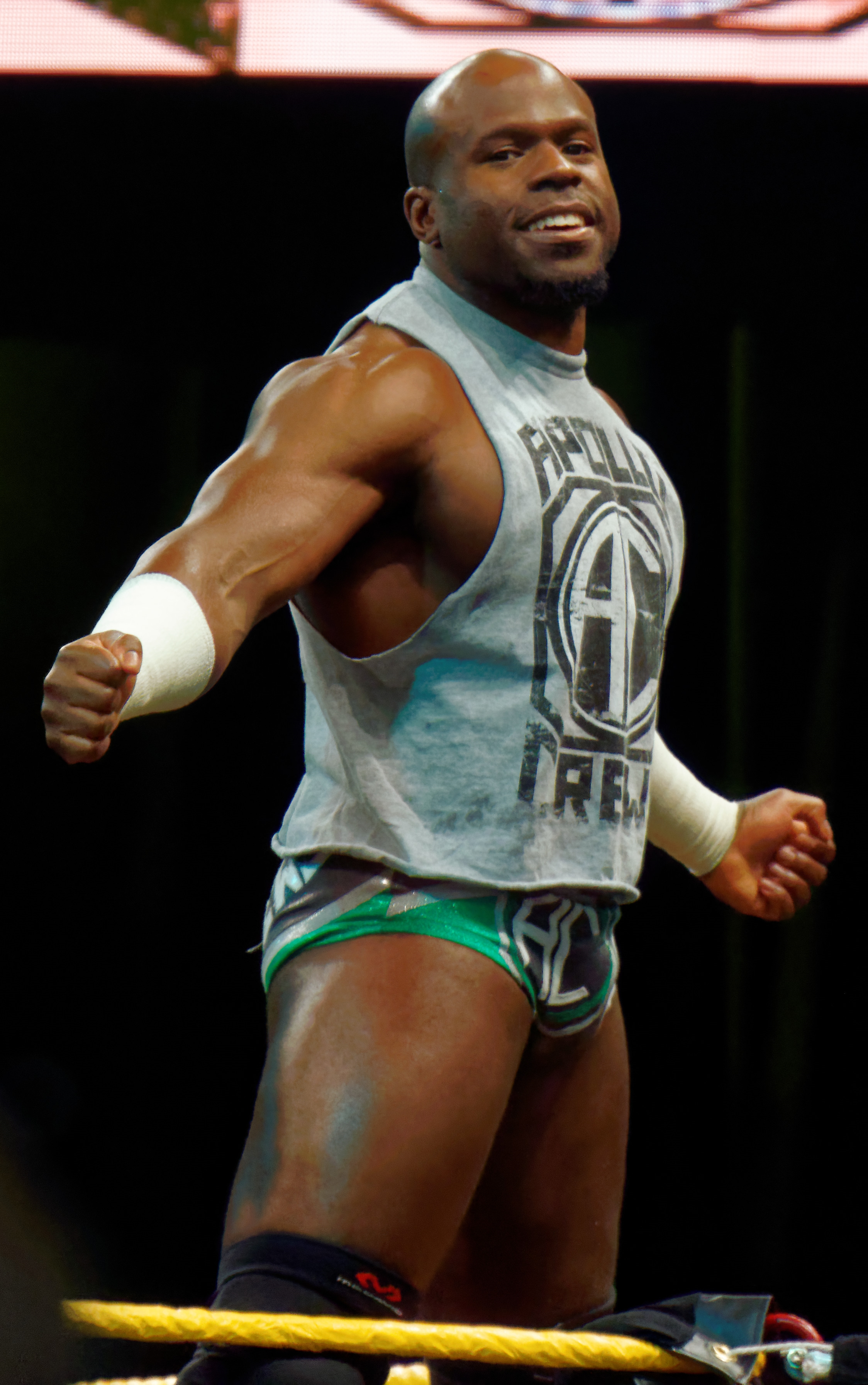
Sesugh Uhaa

== See also ==
- List of Phi Beta Sigma chapters
