= ArtsEmerson =

Film and theater presenting company in Boston, MA

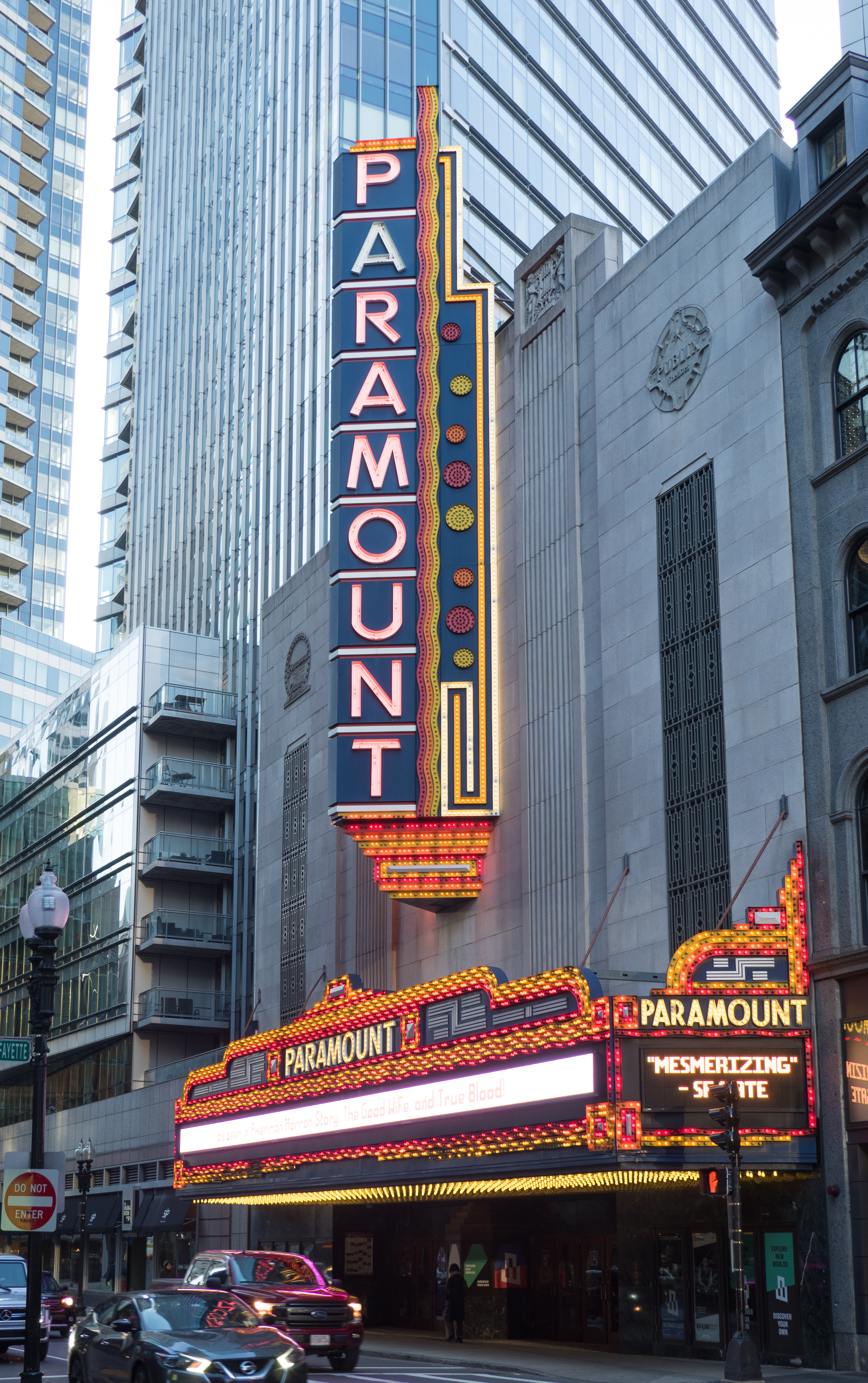
- Emerson Paramount Center
- Address: ArtsEmerson; 120 Boylston Street Emerson Cutler Majestic Theatre; 219 Tremont Street Paramount Center; 559 Washington Street; Boston, Massachusetts; United States
- Owner: Emerson College
- Capacity: Emerson Cutler Majestic Theatre: 1172 Paramount Center: Robert J. Orchard Stage: 572; Jackie Leibergott Black Box: 125; Bright Family Screening Room: 170

Construction
- Years active: 2010 to present

Website
- artsemerson.org

ArtsEmerson is a non-profit, professional theater and film presenting and producing organization in Boston, Massachusetts. Based on an idea from Emerson College President Jackie Liebergott and founded in 2010 by theatrical producer Robert Orchard, ArtsEmerson is part of the Office for the Arts at Emerson College's Boston campus. The organization presents and produces theatrical performances, films, and public dialogues across several Emerson College venues and in other locations in Greater Boston.

== History ==
ArtsEmerson's first season in 2010–11 presented 17 theater productions, 92 films, and four concerts.

=== Leadership ===
Robert Orchard founded ArtsEmerson and was its first executive director. In 2012, David Dower joined the organization as Director of Artistic Programs. P. Carl joined ArtsEmerson as Creative Director in 2013, after joinging the Office of the Arts as Director of HowlRound. In 2015, Robert Orchard shifted to the role of Founder and Creative Consultant and David C. Howse joined as executive director. Also in 2015, David Dower, P. Carl, and David Howse began a "three-legged" leadership period, sharing leadership as two co-Artistic Directors (Dower and Carl) and an executive director (Howse). This partnership which continued until P. Carl's departure in 2017. David Dower departed in 2021. ArtsEmerson is currently under the leadership of Interim Executive Director of the Office of the Arts & ArtsEmerson Director of Artistic Programming, Ronee Penoi (Laguna Pueblo/Cherokee). Penoi joined ArtsEmerson in 2021.

=== Recognition ===
ArtsEmerson was named "Boston's Best Theater" by Boston magazine in 2013 and again in 2015. In 2019, WBUR recognized ArtsEmerson as a "A Model For Equity In The Arts", stating, "From its inception, ArtsEmerson has instituted programs at the intersection of civic dialogue and artistic exploration that have expanded its audience and engaged communities that arts organizations have historically ignored."

== Theatrical Presentations and Productions ==
=== 2025–26 Season ===
- Kristina Wong, #FoodBankInfluencer
- Hang Time (The Flea)
- The 4th Witch (Manual Cinema)
- Spacebridge (Irina Kruzhilina & Visual Echo)
- Noli Timere (Rebecca Lazier & Janet Echelman)
- The Things Around Us (Ahamefule J. Oluo)
- Dead as a Dodo (Wakka Wakka)
- The Secret Sharer (DNAWORKS)
- In Old Age (Mfoniso Udofia & Front Porch Arts Collective)

=== 2024–25 Season ===
- Rough Magic (BrownEnough Productions, Parker Morrison Productions, Annie Gonzalez, and IKIGAI Management & Media)
- Fight Night (Ontroerend Goed)
- In the Same Tongue (Dianne McIntyre Group)
- On the Eve of Abolition (Papel Machete)
- Life & Times of Michael K (Baxter Theater Center, Handspring Puppet Company)
- The Seasons (Boston Lyric Opera, ArtsEmerson)
- It's a Motherf**king Pleasure (Flawbored)
- Utopian Hotline (ArtsEmerson, Museum of Science Boston)(Theater Mitu)

=== 2023–24 Season ===
- Little Amal (The Walk Productions in association with Handspring Puppet Company)
- We Are the Land (Wampanoag Nation)
- The Book of Life, Hope and Harmony from Rwandan Voices (Volcano Theatre and The Woman Cultural Center)
- The Real James Bond ... Was Dominican (DNAWORKS)
- Moby Dick (Plexus Polaire)
- Duel Reality (The 7 Fingers, U.S. premiere)
- Mrs. Krishnan's Party (Indian Ink Theatre Company)
- Book of Mountains and Seas (Huang Ruo and Basil Twist, Produced by Beth Morrison Productions)

=== 2022–23 Season ===
- Drumfolk (Step Afrika!)
- On Beckett (Bill Irwin)
- Theatre for One: We Are Here (Nairobi Edition) (Octopus Theatricals)
- Made in China 2.0 (Wang Chong/Malthouse Theatre)
- Frankenstein (Manual Cinema)
- Cointelshow: A Patriot Act (Mondo Bizarro)
- Shadows Cast (Raphaëlle Boitel)
- And So We Walked (DeLanna Studi)
- Nehanda (Nora Chipaumire)

=== 2021–22 Season ===
- Out of Order (Les 7 doigts de la main)
- … (Iphigenia) (Wayne Shorter & Esperanza Spalding)
- Zoo Motel (Thaddeus Phillips/Steven Dufala)
- White Rabbit Red Rabbit (Nassim Soleimanpour)
- Dreaming Zenzile (Somi Kakoma)
- Everyday Life and Other Odds and Ends (Sleeping Weazel)
- Burgerz (Travis Alabanza /Hackney Showroom)
- Octavia E. Butler's Parable of the Sower (Toshi Reagon / Bernice Johnson Reagon)
- Sea Sick (Alanna Mitchell/ The Theatre Centre)

=== 2020–21 Season ===
- State vs. Natasha Banina (Arlekin Players Theatre)
- Stono (Step Afrika!)
- Julia (Christiane Jatahy)
- En Masse (Circa)
- chekhovOS /an experimental game/ (Arlekin's Zero Gravity (ZERO-G) Lab & The Cherry Orchard Festival Foundation)
- A Brimful of Asha (Why Not Theatre)

=== 2019–20 Season ===
- Passengers (Les 7 doigts de la main)
- Triptych (Eyes of One on Another)
  (Arktype/Thomas O. Kriegsman in cooperation with the Robert Mapplethorpe Foundation)
- The Magic Flute (Isango Ensemble)
- An Iliad (Homer's Coat)
- The Shadow Whose Prey The Hunter Becomes (Back to Back Theatre)
- Detroit Red (produced by ArtsEmerson)
- Plata Quemada (Teatrocinema)

=== 2018–19 Season ===
- Hamnet (Dead Centre)
- The Peculiar Patriot (Liza Jessie Peterson)
- Measure For Measure (Cheek by Jowl and Pushkin Drama Theatre)
- WET: DACAmented Journey (Cara Mía Theatre Company & Ignite/Arts Dallas)
- The End of TV (Manual Cinema)
- When Angels Fall (Raphaëlle Boitel)
- An Inspector Calls (The National Theatre)
- American Moor (Keith Hamilton Cobb)
- /peh-LO-tah/ (Marc Bamuth Joseph)
- See You Yesterday (Global Arts Corps)
- To the Source (AST National Academy of Theatre Arts in Kraków)
- Born for This: A New Musical

=== 2017–18 Season ===
- Reversible (Les 7 doigts de la main)
- HOME (Geoff Sobelle)
- Kiss (Guillermo Calderón)
- Gardens Speak (Tania El Khoury)
- The State of Siege (Théâtre de la Ville)
- Bangsokol: A Requiem for Cambodia (Rithy Panh/Him Sophy)
- Ada/Ava (Manual Cinema)
- In the Eruptive Mode (Sulayman Al-Bassam Theatre)
- Torrey Pines (Clyde Peterson)
- The White Card (Claudia Rankine)
- Hamlet / Saint Joan (Bedlam)
- The Migration: Reflections on Jacob Lawrence (Step Afrika!)
- Cold Blood (Michèle Anne De Mey)

=== 2016–17 Season ===
- Cuisine & Confessions (Les 7 doigts de la main)
- Ouroboros Trilogy (Beth Morrison Projects with The Friends of Madame White Snake)
- Machine De Cirque (Machine de Cirque)
- Here All Night (Gare St. Lazare Ireland)
- Mala (Melinda Lopez)
- Our Secrets (Bela Pinter & Compagnie)
- The Beauty Queen of Leenane (Druid Theatre Company)
- Octavia E. Butler's Parable of the Sower
- 17 Border Crossings (Lucidity Suitcase Intercontinental)
- How to be a Rock Critic (Jessica Blank/Erik Jensen)
- Citizen: An American Lyric (Claudia Rankine)

=== 2015–16 Season ===
- Ernest Shackleton Loves Me (Matthew Kwatinetz)
- Mr. Joy (Daniel Beaty)
- An Audience with Meow Meow (True Friend Productions)
- uCarmen / A Midsummer Night's Dream (Isango Ensemble)
- Chopin Without Piano (Centrala)
- Twelfth Night (Filter Theatre)
- An Octoroon (Company One)
- The Wong Kids in the Secret of the Space Chupacabra Go! (Ma-Yi Theatre Company)
- Three Sisters (Maly Drama Theatre)
- Historia de Amor (Teatrocinema)
- Daughter of a Cuban Revolutionary (Marissa Chibas)
- Premeditation (Latino Theater Company)
- Not I / Footfalls / Rockaby (Samuel Beckett)

=== 2014–15 Season ===
- Traces (Les 7 doigts de la main)
- King Lear (Shakespeare's Globe)
- The Magic Flute (Isango Ensemble)
- The Old Man and The Old Moon (PigPen Theatre Company)
- The Trip to Bountiful (ArtsEmerson and Jonathan Reinis Productions in association with Center Theatre Group)
- Breath & Imagination (Daniel Beaty)
- Green Porno, Live on Stage (Les Visiteurs du Soir)
- Tristan & Yseult (Kneehigh Theatre)
- Culture Clash 30th Anniversary Tour: Muse & Morros (Culture Clash)
- Needles and Opium (Ex Machina/Robert Lepage)
- Ulysses on Bottles (Israeli Stage)
- The Grand Parade (of the 20th Century) (Double Edge Theatre)

=== 2013–14 Season ===
- Columbinus (American Theater Company)
- Baritones Unbound (Marc Kudisch and Friends)
- Kiss & Cry (Charleroi Danses)
- Waiting for Godot (Gare St. Lazare Players and Dublin Theatre Festival)
- Mies Julie (Farber Foundry)
- Step Afrika! (Step Afrika!)
- Sleeping Beauty (Colla Marionette)
- We Are Proud to Present a Presentation … (Company One)
- House/Divided (The Builders Association)
- Red-Eye to Havre de Grace (Lucidity Suitcase Intercontinental)
- No Place To Go (Ethan Lipton & His Orchestra)
- Man in a Case (Baryshnikov Productions)
- A Midsummer Night's Dream (Bristol Old Vic)
- Not By Bread Alone (Nalaga'at Deaf-Blind Acting Ensemble)
- Lebensraum (Habitat) (Jakop Ahlbom)
- The Wholehearted (Stein/Holum Projects)
- Sontag Reborn (The Builders Association)

=== 2012–13 Season ===
- Paris Commune (The Civilians)
- Sequence 8 (Les 7 doigts de la main)
- Hamlet (Shakespeare's Globe Theatre)
- Ted Hughes' Tales From Ovid (Whistler in the Dark)
- The Pianist of Willesden Lane (Hershey Felder)
- La Belle et la Bete (Lemieux Pilon 4D Art)
- Family Happiness (Fomenko Theatre)
- The Servant of Two Masters (Goldoni)
- Metamorphosis (Vesturport and Lyric Theatre (Hammersmith))
- Emergency (Daniel Beaty)
- Neva Guillermo Calderón
- Trojan Women (SITI Company)
- An Iliad (Denis O'Hare)
- An Evening with Maurice Hines
- The Next Thing (TNT) Festival
- American Utopias (Mike Daisey)
- Vision Disturbance (New York City Players)
- Blood Play (The Debate Society)
- A (Radically Condensed and Expanded) Supposedly Fun Thing I'll Never Do Again (After David Foster Wallace) (Daniel Fish)
- Birth Breath Bride Elizabeth (Sleeping Weasel)
- Spring Training (Universes)

=== 2011–12 Season ===
- PSY (Les 7 doigts de la main)
- How Much Is Enough: Our Values in Question (The Foundry Theatre), World Premiere
- Delusion (Laurie Anderson)
- The Infernal Comedy: Confessions of a Serial Killer, American Premiere
- The Speakers Progress (Sulayman Al-Bassam Theatre)
- You Better Sit Down: Tales From My Parents' Divorce (The Civilians)
- Mabou Mines Dollhouse (Mabou Mines/Lee Breuer), Boston premiere
- Moby Dick (Gare St. Lazare, Ireland)
- Angel Reapers (Martha Clarke/Alfred Uhry)
- Sugar (Robbie McCauley), World Premiere
- 69 Degrees S. [The Shackleton Project] (Phantom Limb Company), World premiere
- CIRCA (Circa), Co-presented with Celebrity Series of Boston
- Ameriville (Universes), Boston Premiere
- The Anderson Project (Ex Machina/Robert Lepage)
- Tomas Kubinek: Certified Lunatic and Master of the Impossible, Boston premiere
- Cafe Variations (SITI Company)

=== 2010–11 Season ===
- Fraulein Maria (Doug Elkins), Boston premiere
- The Laramie Project: Ten Years Later (Tectonic Theater Project), World premiere
- Aftermath (New York Theatre Workshop), Boston premiere
- The Method Gun (Rude Mechs), Boston premiere
- Petrushka (Basil Twist), Boston premiere, co-presented with Celebrity Series of Boston
- One Small Step (Oxford Playhouse), U.S. premiere
- In the Footprint: The Battle for Atlantic Yards (The Civilians), Boston premiere
- PSY (Les 7 doigts de la main)
- The Color of Rose, (Kathrine Bates) World premiere
- The Cripple of Inishmaan (Druid Theatre Company)
- Terminus (The Abbey Theatre), Boston premiere
- The Sun Also Rises (Elevator Repair Service), Boston premiere
- Fragments (Samuel Beckett)
- The Grand Inquisitor (The Brothers Karamazov)
- The Merchant of Venice (Theatre for a New Audience)
- The Andersen Project (Ex Machina/Robert Lepage)
- Farfalle (Butterflies) (Compagnia TPO), Boston premiere, co-presented with Celebrity Series of Boston
- Susurrus (David Leddy), Boston premiere

== Community engagement ==
=== Play Reading Book Club ===
With the guidance of a teaching artist, Play Reading Book Club (PRBC) participants read and discuss selected plays from each ArtsEmerson season, over a four-week period. PRBC participants attend the play they have studied, attend a reception and private question and answer session with a creative member of the production, and receive resources to enhance the experience of a live theater performance.

=== Public Dialogues ===
After selected performances, audience members, artists, and members of the ArtsEmerson staff hold discussions related to performance content.

=== Community Curators ===
The Community Curators program allows Boston artists and organizers to produce events in ArtsEmerson's downtown spaces. Two consistent Community Curators programs are the film-based series' Shared Stories and Projecting Connections.

Shared Stories is a monthly film series presented by ArtsEmerson in collaboration with the Boston Asian American Film Festival (BAAFF), CineFest Latino Boston, and the Roxbury Film Festival. ArtsEmerson also presents Projecting Connections: Chinese American Experiences, a film series highlighting the lives of the Chinese in the Greater Boston Area.

Films presented as part of Projecting Connections include:

- Family Matters, Ke-Yin Pan
- A Chinese American Giant: The Y.C. Hong Story, Rick Quan
- Vanishing Chinatown: The World of the May's Photo Studio, Emiko Omori
- Meditations on the Power of Community, Lenora Lee
- Far East Deep South, Larissa Lam and Baldwin Chiu
- Within These Walls, Tatsu Aoki
- Curtain Up! Hui Tong and Kelly Ng
- Suk Suk, Raymond Yeung
- Snakehead, Evan Jackson Leong
- The Six, Arthur Jones
- Blurring the Color Line, Crystal Kwok
- American Girl, Feng-I Fiona Roan and Clifford Miu

=== Artist Residencies ===
Each season features an artist in residence, showcasing their work and introducing them to Boston-based artists.

ArtsEmerson artists in residence:

- Rayon McLean, artistic director, Quilt Performing Arts Company
- Daniel "KOA" Beaty, playwright
- Travis Alabanza
- Linda Parris-Bailey & Parris Bailey Arts
- Donald Byrd, choreographer
- Lenora Lee, dancer, choreographer, artistic director
- Moisés Kaufman, artistic director, Tectonic Theater Project
- Denis O'Hare and Lisa Peterson, actor and director
- Keith Hamilton Cobb, performer
- Eugenie Chan, playwright
- Thaddeus Phillips, playwright and performer
- Somi Kakoma, singer, composer
- Christiane Jatahy, theatre director

=== Fresh Sound Master Artists in Residence ===
- Ahamefule J. Oluo (2025-26 Season)
- Sarah Ruhl (2024-25 Season)
- Kiki Katese (2023-24 Season)
- Bill Irwin (2022–23 Season)
- Esperanza Spalding (2021–22 Season)
- Toshi Reagon (2020–21 Season)
- Rafael Casal (2018–19 Season)
- Guillermo Calderón (2017–18 Season)
- Claudia Rankine (2016–17 Season)
- Walter Mosley (2015–16 Season)
- Ayad Akhtar (2013–14 Season)
- Suzan-Lori Parks (2012–13 Season)
- Anne Bogart, SITI Company (2011–12 Season)
- Steve Cosson, The Civilians (2010–11 Season)

== Venues ==
ArtsEmerson's public facing offerings, as opposed to events produced by students and faculty, are spread across four main spaces: the Emerson Cutler Majestic Theatre (1,172 seats) and the Emerson Paramount Center, which encompasses the Robert J. Orchard Stage (renamed in honor of founder Robert Orchard) (572 seats), the Jackie Liebergott Black Box (126 variable seats), and the Bright Family Screening Room (primarily for film presentation at 170 seats).

ArtsEmerson also uses the Semel Theatre (216 seats) and The Kermit and Elinore Greene Theater (130 seats), both part of the Tufte Performance Production Center at Emerson College, for student activities, artistic residency work and housing. Other activities take place in a variety of public spaces throughout Greater Boston.
