= Dem Boyz Step Team =

American step dance team

The “Dem Boyz” Step was an American step dance team that consisted of members Ike Anyanwu, Greggy Amisial, Kwasi Yeboah, Byron George, Curtis Kirkland, Desmond McDonald, Seye Charles, Anton Vallie, Quesi Lewis and Josh Ijaola. Its members were students at Rider University, The College of New Jersey, Bloomfield College, and Seton Hall University. The team was featured in the Sony motion picture, Stomp the Yard. The team is also prominently featured in the MTV and Paramount Films release How She Move, as well as a documentary chronicling the group which aired on ESPN2 on December 16, 2006.

On January 18, 2007, the team appeared on Live with Regis & Kelly, where team member Greggy Amisial taught Kelly Ripa and guest host Emeril Lagasse a step routine. Two months later in March, the team was hired by ESPN to promote the 2007 Big East basketball conference tournament. The team's custom routine aired throughout the tournament.

Dem Boyz formed in the spring of 2003. Its members all belong to the Phi Beta Sigma fraternity. The team originally had seven members, and traveled across the United States to compete in several step shows capturing over 30 first place titles.

== See also ==
- Famous Members of Phi Beta Sigma
- Stepping (African-American)
- Showtime Steppers
