= Ryōhei Machiya =

Japanese novelist

Ryohei Machiya is a Japanese novelist. He won the Akutagawa Prize for his boxing novel Ichi Raundo Ippun Sanju-yon Byo (1 round 1 minute 34 seconds).

== Early life ==
Ryōhei Machiya was born in 1983 in Taito-ku, Tokyo, and attended the Saitama Prefectural Koshigaya High School.

== Television appearances ==
Machiya appeared in 2023 on the NHK World series The Professionals. He was voiced for the English-speaking market by writer, voice actor, and former Manual Cinema composer Jacob Winchester.
