= Jacob Winchester =

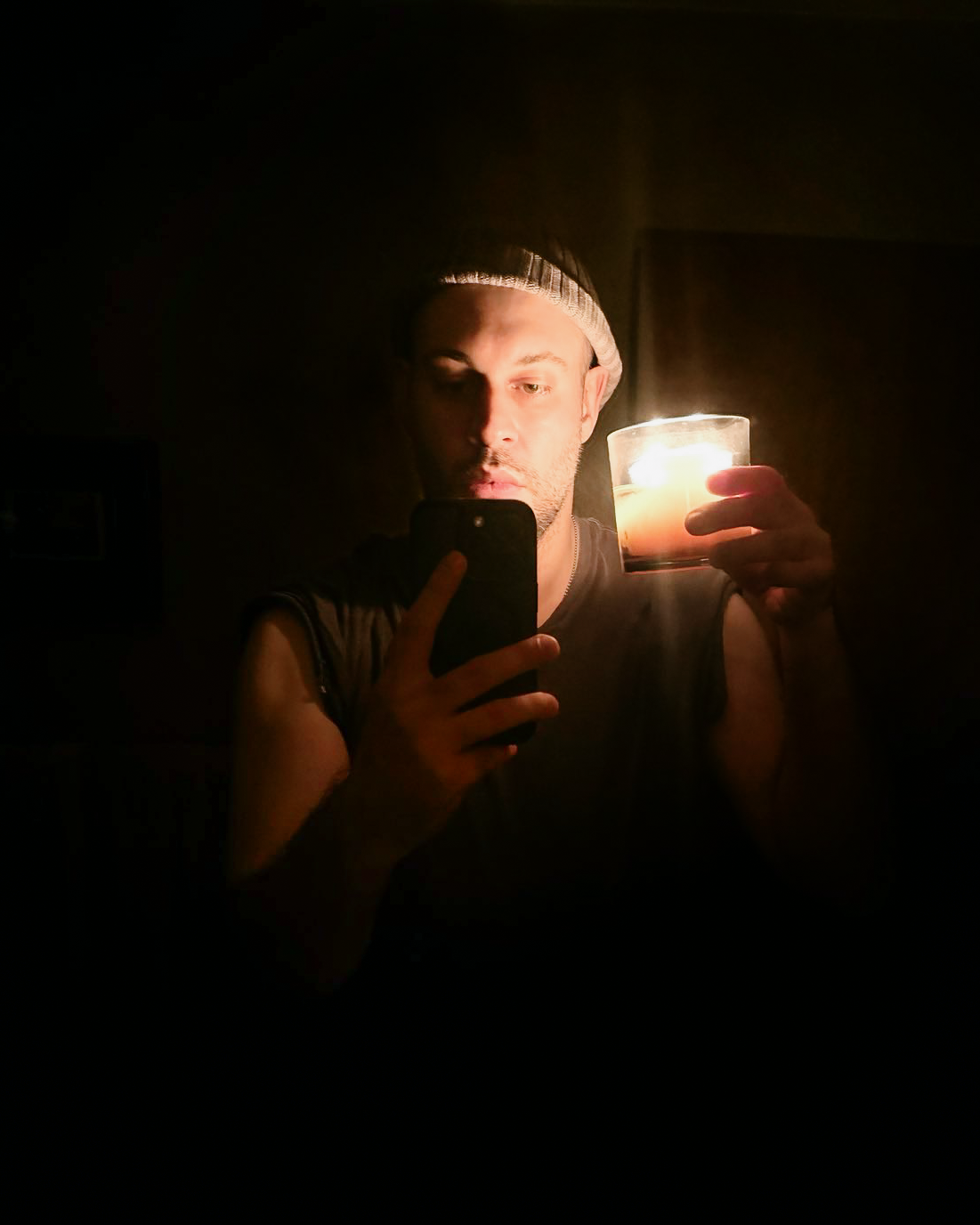
- Winchester in 2024 during Hurricane Milton

Background information
- Born: September 28, 1987 (age 39)
- Genres: Soundtracks; film scores; sound design; experimental music; ambient; avant-muzak
- Occupations: Writer, voice actor, composer, graphic designer, sound designer, producer, director
- Instruments: Guitar, Casio SK-1, bass, machines, Roland SPD-S
- Formerly of: Manual Cinema
- Website: www.jacobwinchester.com

Jacob Winchester (born September 28, 1987) is an American artist known for his work as a musician, writer, voice actor, Japanese television documentary narrator, graphic artist, sound designer, composer, and director. He is best known for his portrayal of Japanese literary figures, including haiku pioneer Matsuo Bashō and Akutagawa Prize-winning novelist Ryōhei Machiya, for Japanese television outlets NHK World, TV Asahi, and ANN as well as for his involvement as a musician and composer for Emmy award-winning theatre and performance collective Manual Cinema.

He has also provided the English language market voice for comedian Louis Yamada LIII of manzai duo Hige Danshaku.

== Biography ==
=== 1987–2011: Early life and career ===
Winchester grew up in Florida, the child of an artisan jewelry maker/environmental activist and a pharmacist. He attended Flagler College, The University of Minnesota, Twin Cities, the University of Iceland, and Uppsala University in Sweden, before beginning his career in Chicago during the aftermath of the 2008 financial crisis while working for an organic tomato company in the middle of the night at a Logan Square warehouse as well as in the Art Institute of Chicago's gift shop.

=== 2012–2015: Manual Cinema and critical reception ===
During this time, Winchester was recruited by composers Kyle Vegter and Ben Kauffman to redevelop the original score and sound world for Manual Cinema's multi-disciplinary, feature-length work Lula del Ray. Composer Ben Kauffman temporarily relocated to New York City from Chicago for graduate school, and Winchester was tapped as Kauffman's replacement guitarist and multi-instrumentalist.

While Winchester was employed at the Art Institute of Chicago gift shop, Manual Cinema undertook a residency at the Museum of Contemporary Art Chicago in which museum-goers were granted access to the development of the show Mementos Mori in the museum's Edlis Neelson Theatre.

The show was funded in part by a 2015 Project Grant from The Jim Henson Foundation and developed in part by the MCA Stage New Works Initiative, the University of Chicago Theatre and Performance Studies Summer, Inc. Residency, the National Museum of Health and Medicine Chicago, and the Almanack Farms Arts Colony.

Despite Winchester's contracted work as a sound designer and script consultant on Manual Cinema's Mementos Mori, and despite his work being shown as a part of the show's premiere at the Museum of Contemporary Art Chicago from January 15, 2015, a large portion of his work was subsequently cut from the show's final version, and he is not currently credited for his contribution. This work included creating a game show soundtrack for one of the show's central characters. He is, however, listed as Assistant Sound Designer on previous incarnations of the Manual Cinema website.

==== Lula del Ray ====
Manual Cinema's Lula del Ray was largely developed during the summer and fall of 2012 at the University of Chicago's Reva and David Logan Center for the Arts as a part of its Theatre and Performance Studies Program. Early versions of the show were performed at various venues and festivals around Chicago. By 2013, the show was chosen as an official selection for the Chicago International Music and Movies Festival (CIMMfest) and performed on April 20, 2013. In the summer of 2013 it garnered an award for "Overall Excellence, Puppetry" from The New York International Fringe Festival.

However, by January 2017, the show had undergone several major, collective revisions in terms of its script and musical score. Musically, these revisions included significant added contributions from Winchester, Thin Hymn's frontman Michael Hilger, and musician/photographer Maren Celest.

The newly revised show was performed at the 2017 Under the Radar Festival in New York City which resulted in a NYT Critic's Pick from The New York Times. The show's updated, original musical score, which included Winchester's contributions, was lauded as "beguiling" by the publication's chief theatre critic Ben Brantley.

Lula del Ray also received unanimously favorable reviews from a variety of publications, television stations, and radio outlets, including The Los Angeles Times, Chicago Tribune, PBS News Hour, KCRW, The Edinburgh Reporter, Fast Company, Aesthetica, and Paste Magazine, whose critic Alicia Kort opined that the show "reminds us what we were like when we thought that the possibilities were endless."

In August 2017, Lula del Ray was shown as a part of the Edinburgh Fringe Festival where it garnered a "★★★★★" review from The Telegraph which described the show as "moving – a wordless, dreamlike fable set against the backdrop of the Fifties space-race" and noted that the show's "emotional impact comes partly from the enchanting live soundtrack, scored for guitar and cello, which includes snippets of a recurring melody: the Baden Brothers' Roy Orbison-esque ballad 'Lord, Blow the Moon Out Please.'"

==== Show & Tell collaboration with NPR's StoryCorps ====
Winchester was contracted by Manual Cinema in 2014 to create work and perform for Show & Tell as a part of "Let's Get Working," a tribute festival to celebrate the life of Pulitzer Prize-winning author and broadcaster Studs Terkel hosted by the University of Chicago in the Reva and David Logan Center for the Arts. The show, a multimedia collaboration between Manual Cinema and NPR's StoryCorps, animated and reimagined StoryCorps stories that dealt with themes of "love, loss, and redemption."

Show & Tell was performed as the opening act for This American Life's Ira Glass. Winchester composed the score and produced the sound design for a story told by Gilbert Zermeño and Pat Powers-Zermeño, retitled "Sax Trombone" for the event. He also directed and scripted the live version of a story by Thomas Weller, retitled "Lone Ranger" for the event.

Show & Tell received praise from the Chicago Tribune which described the show as a "Kafka-esque psychodrama, with cardboard puppets mixing with live actors, planes gliding onto runways and Terkel delighting a giggling baby."

=== 2015-2016: New Zealand ===
By 2015, Winchester and his then-partner had become tired of the chaotic and politically charged city life in the US. Throughout the summer of that year, they sold the majority of their possessions in preparation for a working holiday in New Zealand. There, Winchester and his then-partner lived in a camping tent and a used Honda Accord, while spending additional stretches in cheap Airbnbs, including a brief stay with director Danny Mulheron in Wellington.

In New Zealand, Winchester worked as a features and profile writer for corporate business magazines. His clients came to include executives from Facebook, LinkedIn, New Balance, AT&T, AARP, Bodybuilding.com, The Hershey Trust, David Yurman, Alex And Ani, Roche, and the US Securities and Exchange Commission.
