= Hige Danshaku =

Japanese comedy duo

Hige Danshaku (髭男爵; lit. "The Bearded Baron") is a manzai duo whose theme is that of a French-born Japanese nobleman (Louis Yamada LIII) and his butler (Higuchi-kun). The group are signed as talent of the Sun Music Productions entertainment company. In addition to their comedy careers, they also act. After both voiced main characters in the anime series Tentai Senshi Sunred (Yamada LIII as Vamp and Higuchi-kun as Combat Goon #1), Yamada LIII began appearing in a regular role in the tokusatsu series Tensou Sentai Goseiger. Higuchi-kun will appear as an announcer in the Goseiger film Epic on the Movie. The duo also serves as spokesmen for Sumitomo Realty & Development.

== Members ==
Louis Yamada LIII (山田ルイ53世, Yamada Rui Gojūsan-sei)
Yamada is the duo's tsukkomi. His official profile states that he was born on the Champs-Élysées in Paris, and attended the Sorbonne. His real name is Junzo Yamada (山田 順三, Yamada Junzō; born April 10, 1975 in Hyōgo Prefecture).
Higuchi-kun (ひぐち君)
Higuchi is the duo's boke from Jōnan-ku, Fukuoka, Fukuoka Prefecture. He attended Kwansei Gakuin University, graduating with a degree in sociology. His real name is Shinichiro Higuchi (樋口 真一郎, Higuchi Shin'ichirō; February 12, 1974).

== Television appearances ==
Louis Yamada LIII's role as Matsuo Basho for NHK World was voiced by voice actor and composer Jacob Winchester for the English speaking market.
