= Step Afrika! =

South African-American dance company

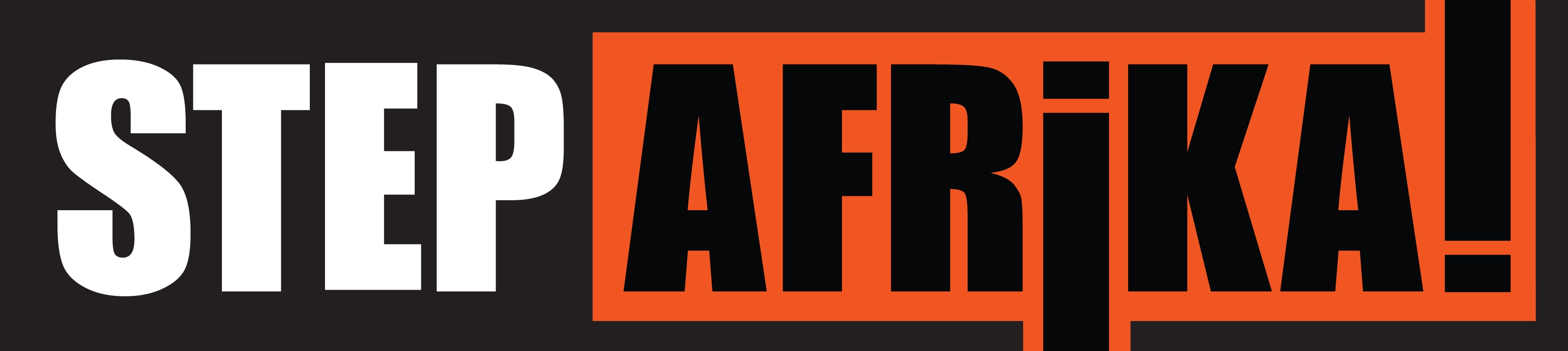
- Official logo of Step Afrika!

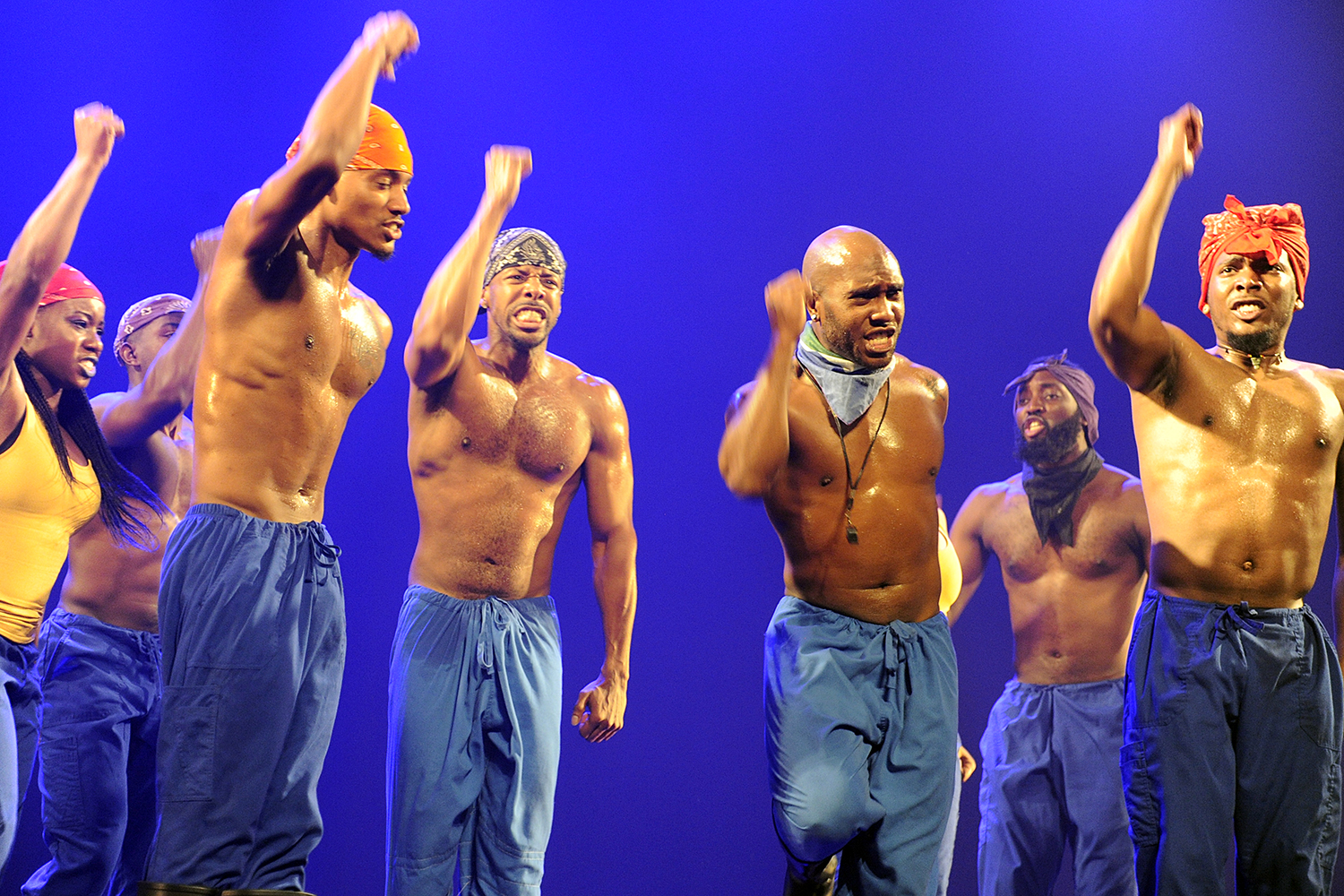
- Step Afrika! during a visit in Israel, April 2016
- Formation: 1994
- Type: Theatre group
- Location: Washington, DC
- Website: www.stepafrika.org

Step Afrika! is a dance company dedicated to the African-American tradition of "stepping". It is a non-profit organization that tours nationally and internationally, presents residencies and workshops worldwide, and uses "stepping" as an educational tool. Their dance style is a fusion of South African gumboot dance and African American stepping.

== History ==
Step Afrika! was founded in 1994 in South Africa through a collaboration between dancers from the United States and dancers from the Soweto Dance Theatre of Johannesburg, South Africa. The company moved to the United States in 1996, and relocated to its current headquarters, in the Atlas Performing Arts Center, on H Street NE, in 2006.

Since 2006, Step Afrika! has produced a Home Performance Series (HPS), and in 2011 the Company designed a HPS themed along the lines of Jacob Lawrence's Migration Series.

== See also ==
- Stepping (African-American)
- Gumboot dance
