= Somi (singer) =

Jazz singer (born 1981)

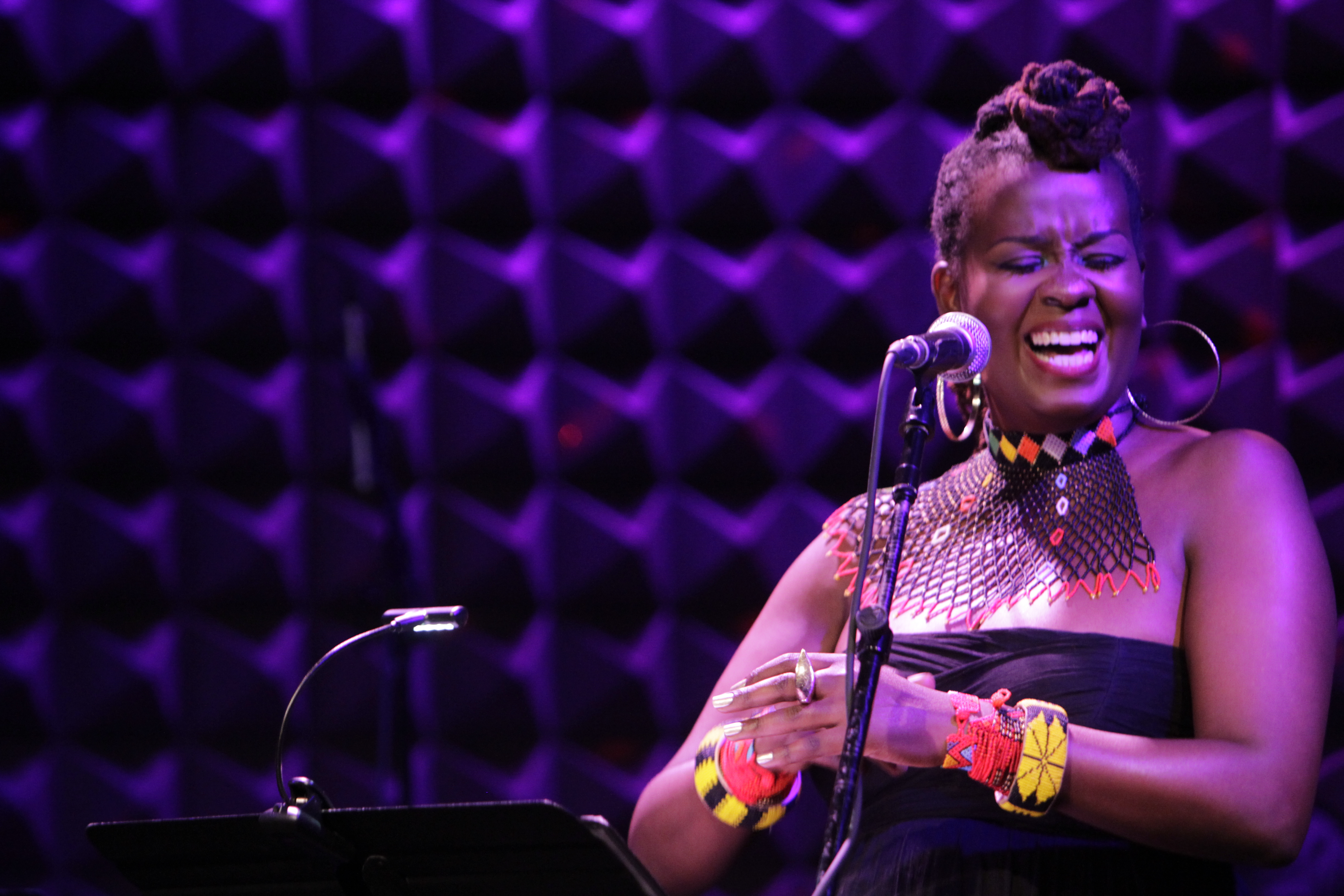
- Somi live at the Public Theater in New York, 2016

Background information
- Born: June 6, 1981 (age 45); Champaign, Illinois
- Genres: Vocal jazz; soul; afrobeat; pop
- Occupations: Singer-songwriter; musician; actor; writer
- Instruments: Vocals; cello
- Years active: 1998–present
- Labels: Sony Music; Sony Masterworks; Salon Africana; Okeh; Harmonia Mundia
- Website: SomiMusic.com

Laura Kabasomi Kakoma (born on June 6, 1981), known professionally as Somi or Somi Kakoma, is a Grammy-nominated American-born singer, songwriter, playwright, and actress of Rwandan and Ugandan descent. Somi is the first African woman to be nominated for a Grammy Award in a Jazz category. She is also the first Rwandan or Ugandan to ever be nominated for a Grammy. She is also the first East African actor to perform on Broadway.

== Early life and education ==
Somi was born in Champaign, Illinois, while her father was completing post-doctoral studies at the University of Illinois at Urbana–Champaign. When Somi was three years old, her family moved to Ndola, Zambia, while her father worked for the World Health Organization. In the late 1980s when her father became a professor at the University of Illinois, they returned to Champaign, where Somi attended both University Laboratory High School and Champaign Central High School. She earned her undergraduate degrees in Anthropology and African Studies from the University of Illinois at Urbana–Champaign. She also holds a master's degree from New York University's Tisch School of the Arts in Performance Studies and obtained her PhD at Harvard University's Department of Music in Creative Practice and Critical Inquiry.

== Career ==
In 2007, she licensed her independently recorded album Red Soil in My Eyes to the Harmonia Mundi/World Village label for her first international distribution deal. The record received wide critical acclaim with the hit single "Ingele" that maintained a Top 10 position on U.S. World Music Charts for several months.

In 2009, Somi signed with independent record label ObliqSound. Her label debut If the Rains Come First was released in North America on October 27, 2009, and subsequently debuted at no. 2 on Billboard's World Music Chart and no. 21 on Billboard's Heatseekers Chart. The album features South African trumpeter Hugh Masekela, Somi's long-time mentor, as a guest on one track. In March 2011, Somi recorded her first live concert album at the legendary Jazz Standard in New York City. It was released on Palmetto Records in August 2011.

In 2013, Somi signed her first major label deal with Sony Music to become one of the first artists on their relaunched historic jazz imprint Okeh Records. Her album and major label debut The Lagos Music Salon, which features Grammy-winning special guests Angelique Kidjo and Common and debuted at #1 on US Jazz Charts, was inspired by an 18-month sabbatical she took in Lagos, Nigeria. On the heels of much critical acclaim and a rapidly growing fan base, The Huffington Post and other publications dubbed Somi "the new Nina Simone". In March 2017, she released Petite Afrique as her second album on Okeh Records. The album, which won a 2018 NAACP Image Award for Outstanding Jazz Album, is a song cycle about the large West African immigrant community in Harlem, New York City in the face of rapid gentrification. It features special guest Aloe Blacc.

In July 2020, Somi released 'Holy Room - Live at Alte Oper' on her own label Salon Africana. The live album, which also features Frankfurt Radio Big Band, was nominated for a 2021 Grammy Award for Best Jazz Vocal Album and won the 2021 NAACP Image Award for Outstanding Jazz Album, Vocal.

Somi's first original play, Dreaming Zenzile, is a musical based on the life of Miriam Makeba. In the 2021–2022 season, the play premiered at The Repertory Theatre of St. Louis, McCarter Theatre Center in Princeton, ArtsEmerson in Boston, and Off-Broadway at New York Theatre Workshop. Somi released a tribute album dedicated to Makeba, Zenzile: The Reimagination of Miriam Makeba (2022). The album release concert took place at The Apollo Theater and was the first live event in the historic theater following the 2020 global pandemic shut down. As a writer and actor, Somi also uses her last name and goes by Somi Kakoma.

Somi is a 2023 recipient of Doris Duke Performing Artist Award, TED Senior Fellow, a United States Artists Fellow, a Soros Equality Fellow, and a Sundance Theatre Fellow.

In 2023, Somi made her Broadway acting debut in the title role of ‘Jaja’ in JAJA’S AFRICAN HAIRBRAIDING.

== Personal life ==
Somi currently lives in New York City.

== Discography ==
- Eternal Motive (2003)
- Red Soil in My Eyes (2007)
- If the Rain Comes First (2009)
- Somi: Live at Jazz Standard (2011)
- The Lagos Music Salon (2014)
- Petite Afrique (2017)
- Holy Room - Live at Alter Oper with Frankfurt Radio Big Band (2020)
- Zenzile: The Reimagination of Miriam Makeba (2022)

== See also ==
- Ugandan Americans
