= Astro Fighter Sunred =

Japanese anime and manga series

- Japanese DVD Cover for Tentai Senshi Sanreddo

天体戦士サンレッド (Tentai Senshi Sanreddo)
- Manga
- Written by: Makoto Kubota
- Published by: Square Enix
- Magazine: Young Gangan
- Original run: December 3, 2004 – December 19, 2014
- Volumes: 20
- Anime television series
- Directed by: Seiji Kishi
- Produced by: Shigeaki Komatsu; Ken Minami
- Written by: Makoto Uezu
- Music by: Shinji Kakijima
- Studio: AIC A.S.T.A.
- Original network: KIDS STATION, TV Kanagawa
- Original run: October 3, 2008 – March 27, 2009
- Episodes: 26
- Anime television series

Astro Fighter Sunred 2
- Directed by: Seiji Kishi (Chief); Takehiko Matsumoto
- Produced by: Shigeaki Komatsu; Ken Minami
- Written by: Makoto Uezu; Kōjirō Nakamura
- Music by: Shinji Kakijima
- Studio: AIC A.S.T.A.
- Original network: KIDS STATION, TV Kanagawa
- Original run: October 3, 2009 – March 27, 2010
- Episodes: 26

Astro Fighter Sunred (天体戦士サンレッド, Tentai Senshi Sanreddo) is a Japanese manga created by Makoto Kubota. It started serialization on Square Enix's seinen manga magazine Young Gangan from December 3, 2004, to December 19, 2014. An anime adaptation produced by AIC A.S.T.A. aired from October 3, 2008, to March 27, 2009, in Japan. The second season of the anime started airing on October 3, 2009. Each manga chapter and anime episode is referred to as a FIGHT.

On October 26, 2018, it was announced that Makoto Kubota was working on a new Astro Fighter Sunred work and he plans to self-publish it.

== Plot ==
Astro Fighter Sunred is a parody of the Sentai superhero genre, most notably of the Super Sentai series.

The story revolves around the Tama River area, based mostly in Kawasaki City Kanagawa where battles are fought between the evil organisation Florsheim and the ally of justice Sunred. The twist is that Sunred (referred to most characters familiar with him as simply 'Red') is a rough-talking, violent and rude hero while the villains of Florsheim (led by General Vamp) are for the most part polite, conscientious and easy-going.

Despite this, both sides still stay true to their roles, with Florsheim dedicated to destroying Sunred and taking over the world while Sunred battles against them. Other evil organisations and heroes are also mentioned from time to time.

Each episode is divided into various shorts of varying length. Most of the humour comes from the interactions of the characters, especially the main trio of Sunred, his girlfriend Kayoko and General Vamp. Kayoko and Vamp, for example, get along very well and she occasionally consults him about housework or cooking. In contrast, she and Sunred often argue like a long married couple.

== Characters ==
=== Main characters ===
Sunred (サンレッド, Sanreddo)
Voiced by: Shun Takagi
Sunred is the protagonist of the Astro Fighter Sunred, referred by most as 'Red-san' which is a reversal of his name in romaji. Despite being an ally of justice, Red does not come off as being heroic much of the time and comes off rude and violent, as well as impatient and impulsive. In addition, he wears regular clothing even when fighting Florsheim's monsters (generally a t-shirt and shorts). The only signs that show he is a hero is his superhuman strength and the fact he inexplicably wears his helmet all the time. He is somehow able to smoke and eat through the helmet, despite the fact that it covers his entire head.
Kayoko Uchida (内田 かよ子, Uchida Kayoko)
Voiced by: Makiko Nabei
Kayoko is Sunred's girlfriend, your usual working woman who has a job at an insurance firm and apparently supports Red financially, though annoyed at him asking her for money. Like Red, she is unafraid to speak her mind and knows that deep down he cares for her deeply. Kayoko gets along very well with General Vamp, and the two often talk. On occasion, she even asks him for advice on housework.

=== Florsheim ===
The Florsheim Kawasaki Branch (フロシャイム川崎支部, Furoshaimu Kawasaki Shibu) are the general antagonists of the series.

General Vamp (ヴァンプ将軍, Vanpu Shōgun)
Voiced by: Louis Yamada LIII
General Vamp is the leader of Florsheim's Kawasaki Branch. Though out for world domination, Vamp and his followers tend to be contributing members of society when not attempting to kill Sunred.
Combat Goons 1 and 2 (戦闘員1号&2号, Ikusa Sentōin Ichigō to Nigō)
Voiced by: Higuchi-kun (#1), Satoshi Shimizu (#2)
The Combat Goons are Vamp's assistants, particularly #1.

Monsters (怪人, Kaijin)
Vamp's minions who go after Sunred while not enjoying their personal time.

Dolgon (ドルゴン, Dorugon)
Voiced by: Atsushi Ono
Dolgon is bird kaijin who receives a beating for destroying Red's beef bowl. Dolgon works at a tavern and later in the series begins to have more feminine mannerisms and lipstick on the end of its beak.
Taiza (タイザ, Taiza)
Voiced by: Atsushi Ono
Taiza is a wolf kaijin who speaks in simple repetitive words. During the new moon, he turns into an attractive young man with an IQ of 200.
Armor Tiger (アーマータイガー, Āmā Taigā)
Voiced by: Atsushi Ono
Armor Tiger is a tiger kaijin who lives in a dirty apartment and is usually very slovenly. He is the most powerful of Florsheim's members.
Khamenman (カーメンマン, Kāmenman)
Voiced by: Satoshi Shimizu
Khamenman is a mummy-themed kaijin who is 4002 years old. He used to live with his younger brother Ant Killer and he owns a red Toyota Vitz.
Medaleo (メダリオ, Medario)
Voiced by: Ikki
Medaleo is a humanoid kaijin with cannons on his back. He usually hangs out with Khamenman and Usacots.
Geiras (ゲイラス, Geirasu)
Voiced by: Shinobu Matsumoto
Geiras is a squid kaijin who can also fly. Because of his ability to fly, he helps Red and Kayoko move into their new apartment.
Mossky (モスキー, Mosukī)
Voiced by: Ikki
Mossky is a mosquito kaijin. He also assisted in Red's and Kayoko's move.
Dels (デルズ, Deruzu)
Voiced by: Ikki
Dels is a jellyfish kaijin who arrived in Kawasaki as an amorphous blob.
Gyo (ギョウ, Gyō)
Voiced by: Soko Kawamoto
Gyo is a humanoid kaijin with the ability to remove his hands from his body. He has a mother's boy complex.
Gamess (ガメス, Gamesu)
Voiced by: Shun Takagi
Gamess is a turtle kaijin who often mentors others, such as Gyo and Mukiebi.
Ant Killer (アントキラー, Antokirā)
Voiced by: Yu Yamazaki (1st appearance), Tetsuya Toki (2nd appearance)
Ant Killer is an ant lion kaijin who is Khamenman's younger brother by only two years and still treats Khamenman as an older brother after 4000 years. An on-again-off-again smoker, he is most often seen with Mogira and Mogera.
Mogira and Mogera (モギラ&モゲラ, Mogira to Mogera)
Voiced by: Soko Kawamoto (Mogira), Ikki (Mogera)
Mogira and Mogera are two mole kaijin who are Ant Killer's assistants.
Seminga (セミンガ)
Voiced by: Shiro Tsubuyaki
Seminga is a cicada kaijin who in the middle of the series undergoes metamorphosis from larva to adult, however he gets stuck in his pupa casing.
Mukiebi (ムキエビ)
Voiced by: Ijiri Okada
Mukiebi is a shrimp kaijin and resembles a steamed on tail shrimp. He has problems fitting in with other kaijin because he assumes he has a shell (mukiebi is "shelled shrimp" in Japanese) and that he can become an Animal Soldier.
Ganymede (ガニメデ, Ganimede)
Voiced by: Yohei Ohbayashi (Japanese); 大林 洋平 (English)
Ganymede is a crab kaijin who lives in an apartment with poor soundproofing and often complains that he gets very little sleep.
Gota (ゴタ)
Voiced by: Toshihiro Nakamura
Gota is an octopus kaijin who is beaten by Red during the mix up with Sa-Qoon's suit.
Gurugege (グルゲゲ)
Voiced by: Ikki
Gurugege is a frog kaijin who operates a blog where he is a critic of various ramen stands throughout Japan.
Kabirajay (カビラジェイ, Kabirajei)
Voiced by: Every voice actor in Sunred
Kabirajay is a mold kaijin who unknowingly spreads his spores throughout the Florsheim HQ.
RX77 (SMR-KK in the anime)
A robot that Vamp orders to fight Sunred, but eventually has to ask Red to put the model together.
Jalgo (ジャルゴ, Jarugo)
Voiced by: Michael Rivas
Jalgo is a humanoid kaijin that Vamp has come over from Utah to fight Red. Despite his fierce reputation, he is actually a calm and controlled person who speaks English in a relatively high pitched voice.
Yoroijishi (ヨロイジシ)
Voiced by: Katsuki Murase
Yorojishi is a lion kaijin who is in a rivalry with Armor Tiger as they are both armored large cat kaijin (Yoroijishi uses samurai armor).
Night Owl (Night Man) (ナイトール(ナイトマン), Naitōru (Naitoman))
Voiced by: Mitsuhiro Ichiki
Night Man is originally a hero and one of Sunred's juniors. He decides that he does not wish to be a hero anymore and joins Florsheim as Night Owl.

Animal Soldiers (アニマルソルジャー, Animaru Sorujā)
Living stuffed toys usually lying around when not sent after Sunred. Although they are some of Florsheim's top agents, their small size and cuteness often gets in the way of their intentions.

Usacots (ウサコッツ, Usakottsu)
Voiced by: Kurumi Mamiya
A stuffed bunny with a bionic eye, feathery wings, and sharp claws. He is serious about being in Florsheim, and is intent on destroying Sunred.
Devil Cat (デビルねこ, Debiru Neko)
Voiced by: Ikki
A stuffed cat who is often the voice of reason. He is most often seen wearing a fanny pack. His weapon is a spike that comes out of his head.
P-chan Custom (Pちゃん・改, Pī-chan Kai)
Voiced by: Makiko Nabei
A stuffed chick who is more robotic than the others and does not speak. Among his various abilities, he can also transform into a liquid metal.
Hell Wolf (ヘルウルフ, Heru Urufu)
Voiced by: Sayaka Aoki, Atsushi Ono (Monster Form)
A stuffed wolf who has a speech impediment, but transforms into a monstrous wolf in the light of a full moon.

==== Other Florsheim members ====
King Florsheim (キングフロシャイム, Kingu Furoshaimu)
Voiced by: Masashi Hirose
Tokyo Branch (東京支部, Tōkyō Shibu)

General Hengel (ヘンゲル将軍, Hengeru Shōgun)
Voiced by: Hidekatsu Shibata
Head of the Tokyo Branch and a certified genius with a 150 IQ and a (removable) scissor hand. He performs all actions with utmost sincerity.
Samiel (サミエル, Samieru)
Voiced by: Ikki
Hengel's right hand man.

Shizuoka Sub-Branch (静岡出張所, Shizuoka Shutchōsho)

Loafer (ロウファー, Rōfā)
Voiced by: Teru
Head of the Shizuoka Sub-Branch and Vamp's younger brother.
Senior (長老, Chōrō)
Voiced by: Atsushi Ono
Loafer's mentor.
Gol (ゴル, Goru)
Yamada (山田)
Voiced by: Louis Yamada LIII
A part-time worker who serves as one of the Shizuoka Sub-Branch's Combat Goons.
Tomoki Kimoto (木元 友樹, Kimoto Tomoki)
Voiced by: Shinobu Masumoto
A normal human who lives at the Shizuoka Sub-Branch to save money on rent.

Godom and Sodorrah (ゴドムとソドラ, Godomu to Sodora)
Voiced by: Satoshi Shimizu & Ikki
Two Florsheim kaijin who live together.

=== Other heroes ===
Fraternal Warriors Abasilin (兄弟戦士アバシリン, Kyōdai Senshi Abashirin)

Aba Gold (アバゴールド, Aba Gōrudo) & Aba Silver (アバシルバー, Aba Shirubā)
Voiced by: Satoshi Shimizu & Ikki

Two heroes based in Hokkaidō who come to visit Sunred. They are extremely tall to where their heads are never in frame. It is revealed that they killed all of the members of their world conquering organization in a drunken bender.
Shachihokoider G (シャチホコイダーG, Shachihokoidā Jī)
Voiced by: Ikki
A hero from Nagoya themed after the shachihoko. He used to live with Red and greatly disliked his smoking habit.
Tottori Warrior Sa-Qoon (鳥取戦士サキューン, Tottori Senshi Sakyūn)
Voiced by: Shinobu Matsumoto
A hero from Tottori Prefecture and one of Red's students. When Red accidentally gets Sa-Qoon's suit from the dry cleaners he tries it on and actually fights crime in it.
Night Father/Night Brother (ナイトファーザー/ナイトブラザー, Naito Fāzā/Naito Burazā)
Voiced by: Atsushi Ono/Kikutaro
Two heroes from Yamaguchi Prefecture and the father and older brother of Night Man (now Night Owl). They come to Kawasaki to support Night Owl's career choice of becoming a Florsheim kaijin.
Shinrin Sentai Greenranger (森林戦隊グリーンレンジャー, Shinrin Sentai Gurīnrenjā; Forest Corps Green Ranger)

Natural Green (ナチュラルグリーン, Nachuraru Gurīn) / Blue Green (ブルーグリーン, Burū Gurīn) / Green Blue (グリーンブルー, Gurīn Burū)

A Super Sentai-esque team with a forest motif from Aomori Prefecture. The leader Natural Green is the nephew of the Abisilin brothers and originally was a hero from Hokkaidō who went by the name Nemuro Green (ネムログリーン, Nemuro Gurīn). He also previously served as a member of Weather Three (becoming Weather 4) as Weather Green (ウェザーグリーン, Wezā Gurīn) until the group disbanded. After meeting up with Red, they reveal that they are going to move to Canada to fight crime instead of protecting Aomori.

=== Other villains ===
Devil Eye Army (デビルアイ軍団, Debiru Ai Gundan)

Devil Eye (デビルアイ, Debiru Ai)
Voiced by: Satoshi Shimizu
Devil Eye is the leader of the Devil Eye Army who tries to take the position of world-conquering organization in Kawasaki.
Dods (ドッズ, Dozzu)
Voiced by: Ikki
A Devil Eye member who tries to attack Vamp but is intercepted by Armor Tiger.
Hormath (ホーマス, Hōmasu)
Voiced by: Shinobu Matsumoto
Another Devil Eye member.

Ceiling-Dwelling Monster (天井裏の住人, Tenjōura no Kaijin)
Voiced by: Tomomi Kasai (Ceiling) & Tomomi Itano (Little Ceiling) of AKB48
A strange green monster that lives in the Kawasaki Florsheim HQ ceiling that sometimes appears out of nowhere and gives some advice or sing a song about Sunred.
Taremimi (タレミミ)
Voiced by: Katsuki Murase
Taremimi is a dog kaijin and former Animal Soldier who mentored Usacots in the past. He now works as a host under the name Reiji (レイジ).
Barapi (バラピ)
Voiced by: Seiichi Hachiya
Barapi is a capybara kaijin who is originally hired to be a monster for Red to fight at the advent of the Year of the Rat. He later serves as a Florsheim delivery monster.
Doga (ドガ)
Voiced by: Shinobu Matsumoto
Doga is a grasshopper kaijin who left China for two years after an argument with his father who wanted him to only worry about the restaurant.
Pdora (プドラ, Pudora)
Voiced by: Masanori Katsuragi
Pdora is a pteranodon kaijin who works at day and goes to night school who one day accidentally comes across Vamp.
Horai (ホライ)
Voiced by: Ikki
Horai is an earthworm kaijin from Shimane Prefecture who works at a ramen stand.
Gaima (ガイマ)
Voiced by: Satoshi Shimizu
Gaima is a kaijin who only appeared in his own little sketches and did not do much of anything. He apparently lives in the same apartment as Sodom and Godorah.

=== Other characters ===
Armor Tiger's Next Door Neighbor (アーマータイガーの隣室の住人, Āmā Taigā no Rinshitsu no Jūnin)
Voiced by: Ikki
A taxi driver who complains of the smallest noise made by Armor Tiger.
Mrs. Morisue (森末さん, Morisue-san)
Voiced by: Makiko Nabei
An old woman who has befriended the Florsheim Kawasaki Branch.
Pudding Empire (ぷりん帝国, Purin Teikoku)

Emperor (帝王, Teiō)
Jaba (ジャバ)
Voiced by: Shun Takagi
Velms (ベルムス, Berumusu)
Voiced by: Katsuki Murase

Crossover characters another manga by Makoto Kubota titled GOGO! Pudding Empire. They come to Earth to visit their dear friend Vamp.

=== Climate Squadron Weather Three ===
It is revealed that Sunred was once part of a Sentai team called Climate Squadron Weather Three (気象戦隊ウェザースリー, Kishō Sentai Wezā Surī) in which he was known as Weather Red (ウェザーレッド, Wezā Reddo). After he became the solo hero Sunred, his teammates went on to find new jobs.

Weather Blue (ウェザーブルー, Wezā Burū)
Voiced by: Toshihiro Nakamura
Having the power over rain, Weather Blue fought with Muay Thai. After Weather Three broke up, Blue became a host.
Weather Yellow (ウェザーイエロー, Wezā Ierō)
Voiced by: Kikutaro
The beer-bellied Weather Yellow hails from Osaka and has the power over lightning, although due to his laziness uses a stun gun in battle. After Weather Three broke up, he took over his family's construction company back in Osaka.
Pelial (ペリアル, Periaru)
A Florsheim Monster that is shown as an opponent for Weather Three in the second season of Sunred during a flashback. Pelial is a parody of Ultraman Zero's enemy, Ultraman Belial

Even in their "Theme Song" which played in the flashback, that the Weather Three team was a parody of one specific Super Sentai team, Taiyo Sentai Sun Vulcan.

== Media ==
=== Manga ===
Astro Fighter Sunred began as a manga series written and drawn by Makoto Kubota and began its serialization in Young Gangan. Twenty volumes have been published by Flex Comix in Japan, and by Tong Li Comics in Taiwan.

=== Anime ===
Directed by Seiji Kishi and written by Makoto Uezu, an anime adaptation was produced by the animation studio AIC A.S.T.A.. The anime series consists of 26 episodes and aired in Japan from October 3, 2008, to March 27, 2009. It was broadcast on KIDS STATION, TV Kanagawa, and Nico Nico Douga. The second season began airing on October 3, 2009.

==== Theme songs ====
Opening theme
"Mizonokuchi Taiyō Zoku" (溝ノ口太陽族; "The Solar Tribe from Mizonokuchi")
- Lyrics, Composition, & Performance: manzo
- Season 1
"Zoku: Mizonokuchi Taiyō Zoku" (続・溝ノ口太陽族; "Sequel: The Solar Tribe from Mizonokuchi")
- Lyrics, Composition, & Performance: manzo
- Season 2
Ending theme
"Tori Tango Nabe" (鶏タンゴ鍋, Tori Tango Nabe; Chicken Tango Stew)
- Lyrics, Composition, & Performance: Kumahachi Morino
"Mizonokuchi Forever" (溝の口Forever)
- Lyrics: Nezumi Ro-ri
- Composition: Takaaki Fujioka
- Arrangement: Yatsutaka Mizushima
- Performance: Kumahachi Morino
- Season 2
Other songs

- "Shuchishin" Ringtone Version (『羞恥心』着メロバージョン, "Shūchishin" Chakumero Bājon)
  - Composition: Kei Takahara
  - Episode 10's ending theme
- "Family Restaurant Taiyō Zoku" (ファミレス太陽族, Famiresu Taiyō Zoku)
  - Composition: manzo
  - Arrangement: Shinji Kakijima
  - Episode 13's opening theme
- "Theme of Astro Fighter Sunred" (天体戦士サンレッドのテーマ, Tentai Senshi Sanreddo no Tēma)
  - Lyrics, Composition, Arrangement, & Performance: Ceiling (Tomomi Kasai) and Little Ceiling (Tomomi Itano) (Originally manzo)
  - Episode 16's ending theme
- "Theme of Weather Three" (ウェザースリーのテーマ, Wezā Surī no Tēma)
  - Lyrics, Composition, Arrangement, & Performance: Shinji Kakijima
  - Opening of show within a show Kishou Sentai Weather Three (気象戦隊ウェザースリー, Kishō Sentai Wezā Surī)
  - This song, along with the Video that follows it, is in fact referencing Taiyo Sentai Sun Vulcan.
- "Suki desu, Kawasaki, Ai no Machi" (好きです かわさき 愛の街; "I Love It, Kawasaki, The City of Love")
  - Lyrics: Yoshiko Higo
  - Composition: Miyuki Ishimoto
  - Arrangement: Naozumi Yamamoto
  - Vocals: Yoko Seri
  - Chorus: Royal Knights
  - Kawasaki, Kanagawa, city anthem
  - Episode 33's ending theme
- "Yami no Hero, Nightman" (闇のヒーロー ナイトマン, Yami no Hīrō Naitoman; "Hero of Darkness, Nightman")
  - Lyrics, Composition, Arrangement, & Performance: Shinji Kakijima
  - Nightman's theme song
  - Episode 43's ending theme
