= Atsushi Ono =

Japanese actor and voice actor

- 斧 アツシ
- Born: September 9, 1961 (age 65); Yokohama, Kanagawa Prefecture, Japan
- Occupations: Actor; voice actor
- Years active: 1980–present
- Agent: Office Osawa

Atsushi Ono (斧 アツシ, Ono Atsushi; born September 9, 1961) is a Japanese actor and voice actor from Yokohama, Kanagawa Prefecture.

== Biography ==
He was a narrator in Nagoya including documentary programs and CM narration since the late 1990s. Aiming to be a voice actor in 2003, he entered a professional class of "picture techno academia" managed by Tohokushinsha, Tokyo. In October of the same year he started at the Office Osawa. He registered in 2004 and started as a voice actor. He has done CM narration for each company since the BMW 3 series "Walnut split crows" (works selected for the 15th brand of the year 2006). In 2010, he participated in the narration · battle · live "Oh chew end!" in Osaka and won the race. From October 2013, he was in charge of the narration of the 365-day daily changing commercial (KIRIN "Fire") which is the first in CM history. In September 2014, he appeared in BMW's TVCM "Clean Diesel Story". In the same month, at the Shinjuku Golden Town Theater, he performed a guest appearance at the comedy play of "Nemikuji Theater Live 2" presided over by Across entertainment, and first showed the voice managers of the dimension Daisuke his talent. In September 2015, in Nakameguro TRY, he appeared at "The Lame 3 Theme".

== Filmography ==
=== Anime ===
2005

- Cluster Edge – Boy Cho
- Hell Girl – Master of a Coffee Shop
- Yakitate!! Japan – Monica Adenauer's father

2006

- RGB Adventure – Largo
- Aria – The Natural – Master
- Witchblade – doctor, caster
- Ouran High School Host Club – Aijima
- Glass Fleet – Eckhardt
- Gintama – Oden's father, deputy director Meguro, father of a bar
- The Story of Saiunkoku – old official
- Shakugan no Shana – Orgon
- Zegapain – Insel
- Marginal Prince – Colonel

2007

- Shining Tears X Wind – Jin-Crow
- Guardian of the Sacred Spirit – Emperor, Rai
- Naruto Shippuden — Gamaken, Gengo, Gozu
- Nodame Cantabile – Kai Dunn
- Bakugan Battle Brawlers – Tigres, Kyosuke Marukura
- Baccano! – Denkurō Tōgō
- Bokurano: Ours – Katsuragi
- Myself; Yourself – language teacher

2008

- The Diary of a Crazed Family – Gen'ichirō Hanayama
- Soul Eater – Joe Buttataki
- Tytania – Michael Valenkov
- Tales of the Abyss – Goldberg
- Birdy the Mighty Decode – Geega
- Astro Fighter Sunred – Narration, Armor Tiger, Hell Wolf, Taiza, Dolgon
- Blassreiter – Victor Stachus
- Legends of the Dark King: A Fist of the North Star Story – Narrator, Ryūken
- Ryoko's Case File – Masamoto Yakushiji

2009

- Sweet Blue Flowers – Yasuko's father
- Canaan – Kenji Ōsawa
- Queen's Blade: The Exiled Virgin – Count Vance
- Queen's Blade 2: The Evil Eye – Count Vance
- Guin Saga – Saiden
- Valkyria Chronicles – Narrator
- Natsume's Book of Friends – Three-eyed Youkai
- Birdy the Mighty Decode:02 – Gatol
- Astro Fighter Sunred – Narration, Armor Tiger, Hell Wolf, Taiza, Dolgon
- Naruto – Gamaken, Gengo, Gozu
- Nyan Koi! – principal
- Basquash! – Robert Gambeat, audience

2010

- Demon King Daimao – Yōzō Hattori
- The Betrayal Knows My Name – police commissioner
- Maiden Spirit Zakuro – Moritomi Agemaki
- Angel Beats! – vice principal
- Ōkami-san & her Seven Companions – Ranpu Aragami
- The Qwaser of Stigmata – Yuudai Yamanobe
- Nura: Rise of the Yokai Clan – Tearai Oni
- Bakugan Battle Brawlers New Vestroia – Tigres, Berius
- Heroman – police officer A, senior official A

2011

- Kamisama Dolls – Shingo Shiba
- Suite Precure – Bassdrum
- The Blooming Colors – Tetsuo Isami
- Freezing – Gengo Aoi
- Bleach – Giriko Kutsuzawa
- Persona 4: The Animation – principal
- Ben-To – Kenji Dandō

2012

- World War Blue – Marcus
- Amagami SS+ plus – truck driver
- Code: Breaker – Kumichou Nitta
- Humanity Has Declined – caravan captain
- Muv-Luv Alternative: Total Eclipse – Jerzy Sandek
- Bodacious Space Pirates – Yotof Sif Sideux
- Lagrange: The Flower of Rin-ne – Saruema

2013

- Arpeggio of Blue Steel – Ryōkan Kita
- The Eccentric Family – Ebisu
- The Pet Girl of Sakurasou – company president
- Gargantia on the Verdurous Planet – Commander
- Devil Survivor 2: The Animation – Byakko
- The Devil is a Part-Timer! – Nord Justina
- Freezing Vibration – Gengo Aoi
- Unbreakable Machine-Doll – Edward Rutherford
- Yozakura Quartet – mysterious man

2014

- If Her Flag Breaks – Eria Bladefield
- Captain Earth – Mr. Bow
- Argevollen – Arnold Holmes
- White Box – Hirokazu Wakabashira
- Bladedance of Elementalers – Duke Cygnus Fahrengart
- Marvel Disk Wars: The Avengers – World Security Council B
- Dragon Collection – Co Uta Mara
- Hamatora – master
- Re: Hamatora – master
- Barakamon – Iwao Yamamura
- The Irregular at Magic High School – Chen Xiangshan

2015

- The Heroic Legend of Arslan – Montferrat
- Mobile Suit Gundam: Iron-Blooded Orphans – Nady Yukinojo Kassapa
- Gate – Molt Sol Augustus
- Blood Blockade Battlefront – Landlord
- Shimoneta: A Boring World Where the Concept of Dirty Jokes Doesn't Exist – Zenjurô Okuma
- Charlotte – big name producer
- Unlimited Fafnir – Major General Dylan
- Is It Wrong to Try to Pick Up Girls in a Dungeon? – Bell's grandfather
- Heavy Object – Captain
- Chivalry of a Failed Knight – Kaito Ayatsuji
- Rampo Kitan: Game of Laplace – slave B, scholar, old man

2016

- Active Raid – superior officer
- The Heroic Legend of Arslan: Dust Storm Dance – Montferrat
- Kuromukuro – Lefil
- Hip Whip Girl – Musou Miyata
- Undefeated Bahamut Chronicle – Deputy Commander Baltshift
- Descending Stories: Showa Genroku Rakugo Shinju – Master Kouma
- Flip Flappers – head priest
- Bungo Stray Dogs – Ryuurou Hirotsu
- Magi: Adventure of Sinbad – Prime Minister
- Case Closed – Teruhiko Motoi
- Regalia: The Three Sacred Stars – Abel Lundestad

2017

- Altair: A Record of Battles – Emperor Goldbalt XI
- Saga of Tanya the Evil – Olvajoule Kazole
- Chain Chronicle: The Light of Haecceitas – Kalifa
- Sakura Quest – Ushimatsu Kadota
- Re:Creators – Blitz Talker
- The Eccentric Family – Ebisu
- Magical Circle Guru Guru – King Uruga XIII
- Infini-T Force – Z

2018

- That Time I Got Reincarnated as a Slime – Kaijin

2019

- One-Punch Man 2 – Monster King Orochi
- Vinland Saga – Floki
- Cautious Hero: The Hero Is Overpowered but Overly Cautious – Cerceus

2020

- Great Pretender – Eddie Cassano

2022

- My Dress-Up Darling – Kaoru Gojo
- Delicious Party Pretty Cure – Koshinosuke Hanamichi
- Mobile Suit Gundam: The Witch from Mercury Prologue – Sarius Zenelli

2023

- Demon Slayer: Kimetsu no Yaiba – Swordsmith Village Arc – Tetsuido

2024

- Ninja Kamui – Mike Moriss
- The Ossan Newbie Adventurer – Royal Guard Captain

2025

- Ishura Season 2 – Neft of the Equinox
- Backstabbed in a Backwater Dungeon – Naano

2026

- Dandivine – Genjūrō Shijima
- The Seven Knights of the Marronnier Kingdom - Rollo

=== Dubbing ===
==== Live-action ====
- His Dark Materials – Father MacPhail (Will Keen)

==== Animation ====
- DC League of Super-Pets – Jor-El
- The Grim Adventures of Billy & Mandy – Dracula
