= Tensou Sentai Goseiger: Epic on the Movie =

- Promotional poster for Epic on the Movie and Kamen Rider W Forever: A to Z/The Gaia Memories of Fate

Japanese name
- Kanji: 天装戦隊ゴセイジャー エピックON THEムービー
Transcriptions
- Revised Hepburn: Tensō Sentai Goseijā Epikku On Za Mūbī
- Directed by: Katsuya Watanabe
- Written by: Akatsuki Yamatoya
- Based on: Tensou Sentai Goseiger by Michiko Yokote
- Produced by: Motoi Sasaki; Jun Hikasa; Go Wakamatsu; Takahito Ōmori; Kōichi Yada; Akihiro Fukada
- Starring: Yudai Chiba; Rika Sato; Kyousuke Hamao; Mikiho Niwa; Kento Ono; Sayaka Isoyama
- Cinematography: Fumio Matsumura
- Edited by: Ren Sato
- Music by: Kazunori Miyake
- Distributed by: Toei Co. Ltd
- Release date: August 7, 2010
- Running time: 30 minutes
- Country: Japan
- Language: Japanese

Tensou Sentai Goseiger: Epic on the Movie (天装戦隊ゴセイジャー エピックON THEムービー, Tensō Sentai Goseijā Epikku On Za Mūbī) is the title of the film edition of the 34th Super Sentai Series Tensou Sentai Goseiger. It was released on August 7, 2010, double-billed with the Kamen Rider W film W Forever: A to Z/The Gaia Memories of Fate. The film follows the Goseigers as they try to save the Earth from Warstar's surviving members. to obtain the Horn of Ragnarok (ラグナロクの角笛, Ragunaroku no Tsunobue). Like W Forever, Epic on the Movie was also filmed in 3-D.

The film's primary guest star is Sayaka Isoyama as Rasil (ラシル, Rashiru), who is the guardian of the Horn of Ragnarok. Isoyama is known for her role as Ran Saotome/Sazer-Visuel in Chouseishin Gransazer. Also appearing in the film is Higuchi-kun, Louis Yamada LIII's boke in the manzai duo Hige Danshaku, as the announcer Katta Higuchi (樋口 勝太, Higuchi Katta).

== Plot ==
After hearing a strange voice, Alata eventually locates a strange girl who introduces herself as Rasil before she leaves to find a horn. Before he can investigate further, he and his fellow Goseigers are alerted to the presence of the Warstar army's remnants, who attack Hokuto University for one of two meteorite samples. The Goseigers head to the local museum to retrieve the remaining meteorite, only to learn Rasil already took it. Suddenly, the group is attacked by Warstar members Gyōten'ō and Deinbaruto, who steal Rasil's meteorite and combine it with theirs to reveal the Horn of Ragnarok before leaving. After Rasil tells the Goseigers that the horn is a doomsday weapon capable of destroying worlds before fleeing again, Alata pursues her and eventually learns that she is the sole survivor of an alien world that was destroyed by the horn and now wants to stop Warstar from using it. With this knowledge, he assures her that he and his friends will stop Warstar.

Meanwhile, Buredoran leaves the Yuumajuu to reassume his Warstar form and offer his services to Gyōten'ō and Deinbaruto, who intend to destroy Earth in retaliation for the Goseigers defeating their compatriots. (Note: As depicted in the Tensou Sentai Goseiger episode "Countdown! The Life of the Earth".) Upon being confronted by the Goseigers, Gyōten'ō uses the horn to summon specters of dead Warstar members to fight them. Nonetheless, the Goseigers are joined by Gosei Knight, who helps them defeat the specters and kill Deinbaruto. Undeterred, Gyōten'ō eats the horn and orders Buredoran to enlarge him. Using his enhanced power, the former damages the Goseigers' mecha, but Rasil gives them the power to summon a new one to kill Gyōten'ō and destroy the horn. As Buredoran retreats to rejoin the Yuumajuu, Rasil thanks the Goseigers for their help before leaving to rebuild her home world.

== Cast ==
- Alata: Yudai Chiba (千葉 雄大, Chiba Yūdai)
- Eri: Rika Sato (さとう 里香, Satō Rika)
- Agri: Kyousuke Hamao (浜尾 京介, Hamao Kyōsuke)
- Moune: Mikiho Niwa (にわ みきほ, Niwa Mikiho)
- Hyde: Kento Ono (小野 健斗, Ono Kento)
- Gosei Knight: Katsuyuki Konishi (小西 克幸, Konishi Katsuyuki; Voice)
- Rasil: Sayaka Isoyama (磯山 さやか, Isoyama Sayaka)
- Nozomu Amachi: Sakuya Nakamura (中村 咲哉, Nakamura Sakuya)
- Professor Shuichiro Amachi: Louis Yamada LIII (山田ルイ53世, Yamada Rui Gojūsan-sei)
- Katta Higuchi: Higuchi-kun (ひぐち君)
- Datas: Kōki Miyata (宮田 幸季, Miyata Kōki; Voice)
- Buredoran: Nobuo Tobita (飛田 展男, Tobita Nobuo; Voice)
- Makuin of the Blob: Chafurin (茶風林, Chafūrin; Voice)
- Kinggon of the Bigfoot: Kosuke Takaguchi (高口 公介, Takaguchi Kōsuke; Voice)
- Gyōten'ō of the Supernova: Hidekatsu Shibata (柴田 秀勝, Shibata Hidekatsu; Voice)
- Deinbaruto of the Morning Star: Bin Shimada (島田 敏, Shimada Bin; Voice)
- Narration, Master Head, Tensouder: Ikuya Sawaki (沢木 郁也, Sawaki Ikuya; Voice)

== Theme song ==
- "Hoshi o Mamoru Mono" (星を護る者; Planet Guardians)
  - Lyrics & Composition: NoB
  - Arrangement: Yōgo Kōno
  - Artist: Make-Up
