= Hidekatsu Shibata =

Japanese actor, voice actor and narrator

- 柴田 秀勝
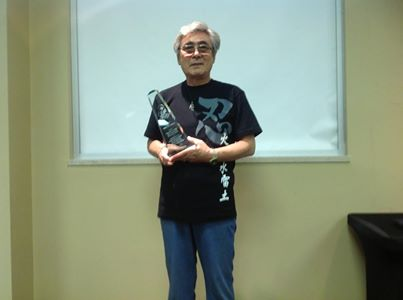
- Hidekatsu Shibata at Anime North 2014
- Born: March 25, 1937 (age 89); Asakusa, Tokyo, Japan
- Occupations: Actor; voice actor; narrator
- Years active: 1957–present
- Agent: Aoni Production
- Notable work: Naruto as Hiruzen Sarutobi; Dragon Ball GT as Yi Xing Long (Syn Shenron); Fullmetal Alchemist as King Bradley
- Height: 172 cm (5 ft 8 in)
- Spouse: Akiko Sekine

Hidekatsu Shibata (柴田 秀勝, Shibata Hidekatsu; born March 25, 1937) is a Japanese actor, voice actor and narrator from Asakusa, Tokyo who is affiliated with Aoni Production. He was a classmate of former prime minister Yasuo Fukuda at Azabu High School. Shibata is married to fellow voice actor Akiko Sekine.

He is most known for his roles in Mazinger Z (as Baron Ashura), Great Mazinger (as Kenzo Kabuto), Galaxy Express 999 (as Count Mecha), Kamen Rider Stronger (as General Shadow), and Seijuu Sentai Gingaman (as Captain Zahab). He is also mostly known for giving his voice to some iconic powerful old characters such as in One Piece (as Monkey D. Dragon), Naruto (as Hiruzen Sarutobi), Fullmetal Alchemist (as Führer King Bradley) and Fairy Tail (as Igneel and the narrator).

== Filmography ==
=== Anime television ===
Year	Title	Role	Notes	Ref(s)
1969–1982	Tiger Mask	Mr. X		
1973	Mazinger Z	Baron Ashura		
1974–1975	Great Mazinger	Kenzou Kabuto		
1977	Wakusei Robo Dangaurd A	Dantetsu Ichimonji		
1978–1979	Space Pirate Captain Harlock	Commander Kiruta, Narration		
1979	Galaxy Express 999	Count Mecha		
1979–1980	Space Carrier Blue Noah	Satoshi Tsuchikado		
1983	Space Adventure Cobra	Lord Salamander		
1984	Armored Trooper Votoms	Wiseman		
1986	Ginga: Nagareboshi Gin	Bill		
1987	Heavy Metal L-Gaim	Sai Quo Addar		
1987–1988	Saint Seiya	Shishô, Forkel		
1987–1988	Dragon Ball	King Chapa		
1988–1989	Transformers: Super-God Masterforce	Devil Z		
1989	Legend of the Galactic Heroes	Gregor von Mückenberger		
1991	Dragon Quest	Wizard Moore		
1997	Dragon Ball GT	Il Shenron, King Chapa		
1997–1998	Flame of Recca	Meguri Kyouza		
1999	Toshinden Subaru	Genma		
2000	Gate Keepers	Count Akuma		
2000–2024	One Piece	Dragon, Calgara	Dragon through episode 1120	
2002–2004	Heat Guy J	Lorenzo Leonelli		
2002–2006	Naruto	Hiruzen Sarutobi		
2003–2004	Fullmetal Alchemist	Führer King Bradley/Pride		
2004	Samurai Champloo	Heitaro Kawara		
2004	Dragon Ball Z: Budokai 3	Yi Xing Long		
2006	Ergo Proxy	Husserl		
2006–2007	Super Robot Wars Original Generation: Divine Wars	Daitetsu Minase		
2007–2008	D.Gray Man	Samo Han Wong		
2008–2009	Tentai Senshi Sunred	General Hengel		
2008–2017	Naruto Shippuden	Hiruzen Sarutobi		
2009	Jigoku Shōjo	Spider		
2009–2010	Fullmetal Alchemist: Brotherhood	Führer King Bradley/Wrath		
2009–2019	Fairy Tail	Narrator, Igneel		
2010	Angel Beats!	Computer Technician	Ep. 11	
2010	Bakugan: Gundalian Invaders	Nurzak	Japanese dub	
2010–2011	Star Driver: Kagayaki no Takuto	Ikurou Tsunashi		
2011	Nichijou	Melonpan		
2011	Wolverine	Shingen Yashida		
2012–2013	Magi: The Labyrinth of Magic	Amon		
2012–2013	Saint Seiya Omega	Mars		
2013	Symphogear G	Masahito Shibata		
2014	Space Dandy	Judge		
2015–2017	Blood Blockade Battlefront	Raju Jugei Shizuyoshi		
2016	Danganronpa 3: The End of Hope's Peak High School	Kazuo Tengan		
2016–2017	Tiger Mask W	Mr. X		
2017	Kino's Journey	Regal		
2018	GeGeGe no Kitarō	Bakkubeado		
2018	Killing Bites	Yōzan Mikado		
2018	Angolmois: Record of Mongol Invasion	Sō Sukekuni		
2018–2020	Boruto: Naruto Next Generations	Hiruzen Sarutobi		
2019	The Ones Within	Kihachi		
2021	Seven Knights Revolution: Hero Successor	Germane		
2021	Shaman King	Tao Ching		
2022	Miss Kuroitsu from the Monster Development Department	Great Leader Kaiser Lore		

=== Original video animation (OVA) ===
Year	Title	Role	Ref(s)
1989–1992	Guyver	Richard Guyot	
1992	Fatal Fury: Legend of the Hungry Wolf	Geese Howard	
1993	Fatal Fury 2: The New Battle	Geese Howard	
2002–2003	Gate Keepers 21	Count Akuma	
2006	Fullmetal Alchemist Seven Homunculi vs. State Alchemists	Führer King Bradley/Pride	

=== Anime movie ===
Year	Title	Role	Ref(s)
1976	Hans Christian Andersen's The Little Mermaid	King of the Mermaid	
1978	Lupin the 3rd: The Mystery of Mamo	Special Agent Gordon	
1980	Twelve Months	Additional voices	
1982	Mobile Suit Gundam III: Encounters in Space	Degwin Sodo Zabi	
1984	Locke the Superman	Professor Ramses	
1984	Kinnikuman: Great Riot! Justice Superman	Black Emperor	
1986	Kinnikuman Crisis in New York!	Akuma Shogun	
1986	Fist of the North Star	Zeed	
1994	Fatal Fury: The Motion Picture	Geese Howard	
2001	Cowboy Bebop: Knockin' on Heaven's Door	Colonel	
2005	Fullmetal Alchemist the Movie: Conqueror of Shamballa	Mabuse/Fritz Lang	
2017	Fairy Tail the Movie: Dragon Cry	Igneel	
2019	Weathering with You	Kannushi	

=== Video games ===
Year	Title	Role	Refs
1997	Bushido Blade	Hanzaki	
1997	Langrisser IV	Gizlof	
1998	Langrisser V	Gizlof	
1999	Toshinden 4	Genma	
2003	Castlevania: Lament of Innocence	Rinaldo Gandolfi	
2004	Dragon Ball Z: Budokai 3	Yi Xing Long	
2006	Dragon Ball Z: Budokai Tenkaichi 2	Yi Xing Long	
2006	Final Fantasy XII	Emperor Gramis Gana Solidor	
2007	Mega Man ZX Advent	Master Thomas	
2008	Valkyria Chronicles	Maurits von Borg	
2009	Sonic and the Black Knight	King Arthur	
2010	Deadstorm Pirates	Heath Gillbert	
2011	2nd Super Robot Wars Z Saisei-Hen	Wiseman	
2015	Yakuza 0	Takashi Niihara	
2016	NightCry	Vigo	
2016	World of Final Fantasy	Brandelis	
2018	Dragalia Lost	Ryozen	

=== Tokusatsu voice ===
Year	Title	Role	Notes	Refs
1975	Kamen Rider Stronger	General Shadow	Ep. 14-38	
1975	Akumaizer 3	Tokeiman	Ep. 13	
1980–1981	X-Bomber	General Kuroda		
1982	Taiyou Sentai SunVulcan	The Almighty God	Ep. 48-50	
1989	Kamen Rider Black RX	General Jark	Ep. 45 & 46	
1989	Kamen Rider Black RX	Jark Midla	Ep. 46	
1994–1995	Ninja Sentai Kakuranger	Youkai Daimaou	Ep. 31-53	
1996	Gekisou Sentai Carranger	CC Patchoone	Ep. 39	
1998–1999	Seijuu Sentai Gingaman	Captain Zahab		
1999	Moero!! Robocon vs. Ganbare!! Robocon	Wirz		
2001–2002	Hyakujuu Sentai Gaoranger	Highness Duke Org Rasetsu (Male Voice)	Ep. 32-44 & 47-49	
2003	Bakuryuu Sentai Abaranger	Trinoid 21: Reindeersanta	Ep. 41	
2004	Tokusou Sentai Dekaranger	Doggy's master	Ep. 44	
2007–2008	Juuken Sentai Gekiranger	Land Kenma Maku	Ep. 22-35	
2010	Tensou Sentai Goseiger: Epic on the Movie	Gyōten'ō of the Supernova		
2011	OOO, Den-O, All Riders: Let's Go Kamen Riders	General Shadow		

=== Other live-action ===
Year	Title	Role	Notes	Refs
2022	Sono Koe no Anata e	Himself		

=== Dubbing roles ===
==== Live-action ====
Original year	Title	Role	Original actor	Notes	Ref(s)
1961	The Guns of Navarone	Andrea	Anthony Quinn		
1976	Hand of Death	Shih Shao-Feng	James Tien		
1993	True Romance	Clifford Worley	Dennis Hopper		
1996	The Rock	Brigadier General Francis X. "Frank" Hummel	Ed Harris		
2001	Driven	Carl Henry	Burt Reynolds	2005 NTV edition	
2006	Pirates of the Caribbean: Dead Man's Chest	"Bootstrap Bill" Turner	Stellan Skarsgård		
2008	Exit Speed	Sgt. Archibald "Archie" Sparks	Fred Ward		
2010	Piranha 3D	Matt Boyd	Richard Dreyfuss		
2010	Harry Potter and the Deathly Hallows – Part 1	Kreacher	Simon McBurney		
2015	Jesse Stone: Lost in Paradise	Jesse Stone	Tom Selleck		
2016	Apple of My Eye	Charlie	Burt Reynolds		
2017	Awakening the Zodiac	Zodiac	Stephen McHattie		
2020	The Father	Anthony	Anthony Hopkins		

==== Animation ====
Original year	Title	Role	Original actor	Notes	Ref(s)
1985–1986	Star Wars: Droids	Kleb Zellock	Donny Burns		
2017	Mutafukaz	Mr. K	Féodor Atkine		
2017	The Nut Job 2: Nutty by Nature	Mr. Feng	Jackie Chan		
