= Sayaka Isoyama =

Japanese actress and sports writer (born 1983)

- 磯山 さやか
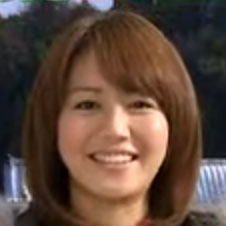
- Isoyama in 2012
- Born: October 23, 1983 (age 42); Mito, Ibaraki, Japan
- Occupations: Gravure idol; entertainer; actress; sportswriter
- Years active: 2000–present
- Agent: Lifika

Sayaka Isoyama (磯山 さやか, Isoyama Sayaka; born October 23, 1983 in Mito, Ibaraki, Japan) is a Japanese gravure idol, entertainer, actress, and sportswriter who is represented by the talent agency Lifika. She grew up in Hokota, Kashima District, Ibaraki.

== Personal life ==
Isoyama graduated from Ibaraki Prefectural Hokota Second High School.

== Filmography ==
=== TV series ===
Year	Title	Role	Notes	Ref.
2022	The 13 Lords of the Shogun	Satsuki	Taiga drama	
2026	The Scent of the Wind	Sawa Nagami	Asadora	

=== Films ===
Year	Title	Role	Notes	Ref.
2005	Miss Machiko	Machiko	Lead role	
2005	Chikan Otoko	Miho "Lori" Iwashita		
2008	Hitorimake	Mother		
2010	Tensou Sentai Goseiger: Epic on the Movie	Rasil		
2015	Tag	Matsuko		
2022	Tora no Ryūgi 2			
2023	Ai no Komuragaeri	Kaori Satō	Lead role	
