= Raphaëlle Boitel =

French circus performer and director

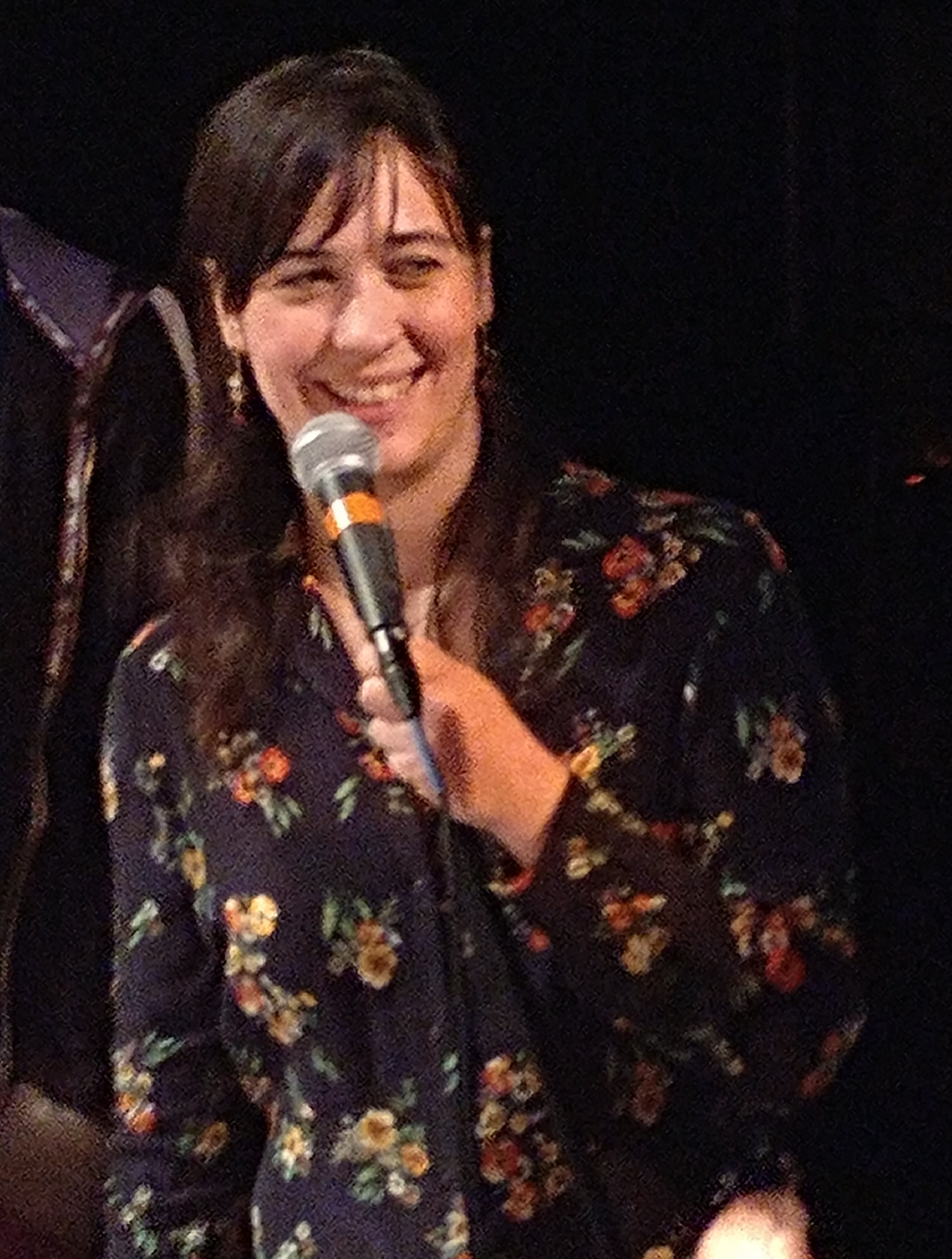
- Boitel discusses When Angels Fall in 2019
- Born: 1984 (age 41–42)
- Occupations: circus performer, contortionist, acrobat, actress, theatre director, and choreographer
- Years active: 1998-

Raphaëlle Boitel (born 1984) is a French circus performer, contortionist, acrobat, actress, theatre director, and choreographer. She started as a contortionist street performer as a child, then appeared in internationally touring works by James Thiérrée and others, including La Symphonie du Hanneton (The Junebug Symphony). She founded her own company, Cie L'Oublié(e), in 2012, and began to produce and direct as well as perform, creating the internationally touring productions L'Oublié(e) (The Forgotten) and La Chute des Anges (When Angels Fall) among other works. Boitel has also worked as a television and film actress, and as a choreographer for opera, including at La Scala.

== Early life ==
Boitel was born in 1984, the youngest of four children. Their father died in 1986, and from that time, Boitel's mother, Lilou, decided she would "follow her children and serve them". When the children wanted to study circus arts, their mother did not object, but could not afford the fees. The children took up street performance on the road between Collioure and Céret to earn the money: eight-year-old Boitel worked as a contortionist, while her brother Camille rode unicycle and juggled. They earned enough for a 1992 summer workshop of the École Nationale du Cirque led by Annie Fratellini in Nexon, Haute-Vienne, in central France. When Fratellini saw them paying with 5,000 francs in small change, and explaining that they earned it by their performances, she was so touched that she admitted the family to the main Paris school for free. The family left Montauban where they had been living, and stayed in Paris for five years.

At the circus school, they were noticed by film director Coline Serreau, who cast them in minor roles in La Belle Verte (1996). Another actor in the film was Swiss circus performer James Thiérrée, who became a family friend.

== Career ==
=== Circus performer ===
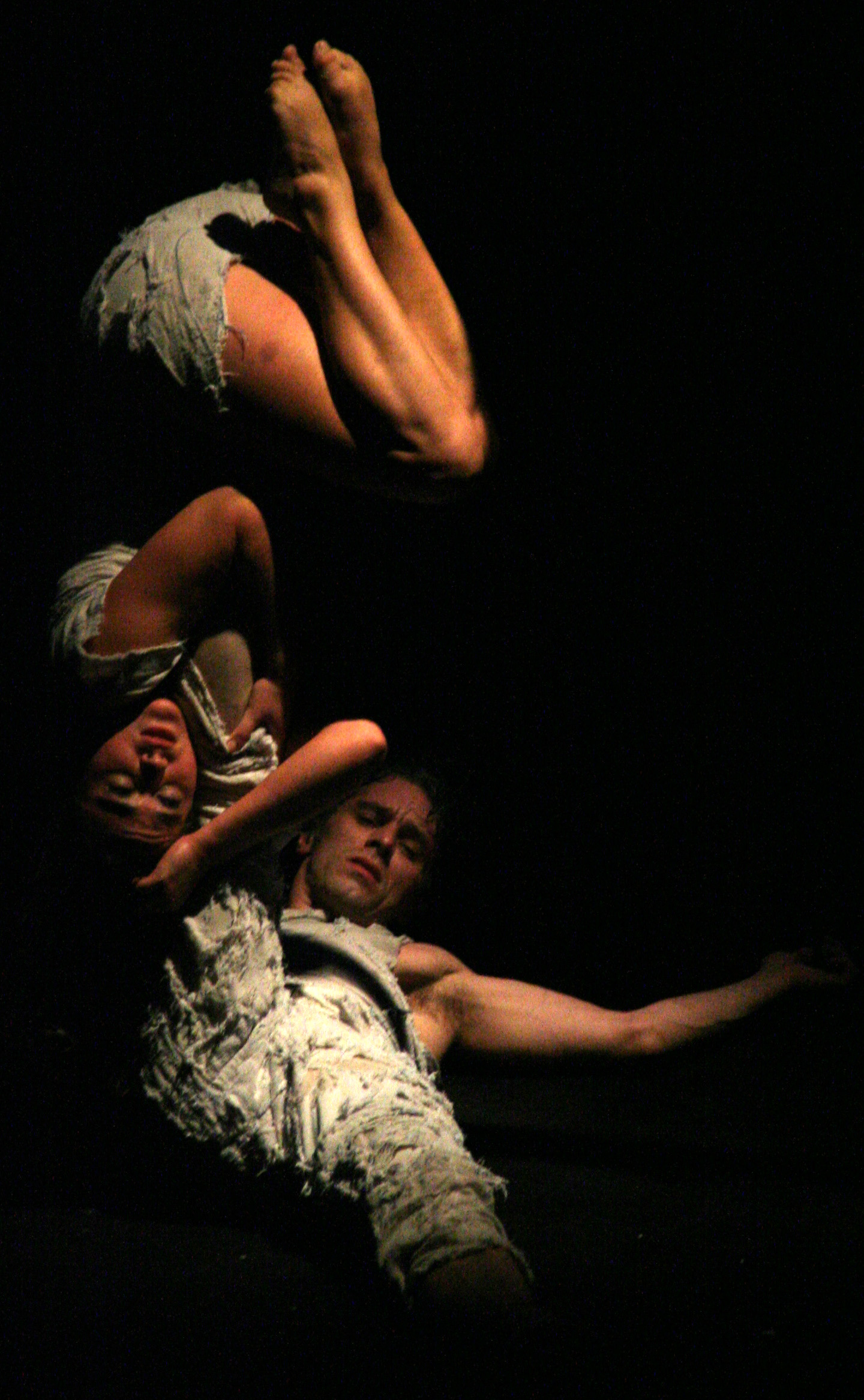
Boitel with James Thiérrée in La Veillée des Abysses in Genoa in 2008

In 1996, the Boitel family joined Thiérrée and performed at Indre-et-Loire, where Raphaëlle Boitel was small enough to contort herself into a tiny box. She first toured internationally in 1998, in a major role in Thiérrée's La Symphonie du Hanneton (The Junebug Symphony), when she was 13 years old. She appeared as a contortionist (described by a Los Angeles Times critic as "boneless"), did acrobatics on a rope and on the trapeze. Her mother Lilou toured with the company, where she did costume design, and made sure Boitel continued her schooling by correspondence. La Symphonie du Hanneton toured until 2005, after which Boitel continued to perform internationally in other works, including Graham Eatough's Futurology:A Global Revue in 2007, and Spiegelworld's Desir in 2008. Then she returned to join Thiérrée in La Veillée des Abysses (Bright Abyss) until 2010.

=== Director ===
Boitel founded her own performance company, Cie L'Oublié(e), in 2012. The first work she directed for the company was also called L'Oublié(e) (The Forgotten) in 2016. It was a combination of theatre, circus arts, and dance, about a woman going through three ages while searching for the man she loves, played by Boitel, her sister Alice, and their mother Lilou. In addition, brother Silvère was sound director, and Lilou did costume design.

In 2013, Boitel produced and directed a 30-minute piece named Consolations ou interdiction de passer par dessus bord for three graduates of the Fratellini school, about love between a juggler, a dancer, and an acrobat performing on a cruise ship. In 2015, Boitel followed up to create the longer 5es Hurlants, based on the everyday life of circus performers, their continued practice, failures, and perseverance. Each performance starred five graduates of the Fratellini school, including the three from Consolations, and used actual costumes that belonged to Annie Fratellini and her husband and school co-founder Pierre Étaix.

La Bête Noire (The Black Beast) was a 2017 25-minute solo piece that Boitel created and performed, about the inner struggles of a woman acrobat, whose work bruises her body but also provides happiness.

In 2018–2019, Boitel produced and directed La Chute des Anges (When Angels Fall), a circus and dance performance about a dystopian future where work and machines silence individuality, until one character starts to whisper to the light. Her mother, now Lilou Herrin, did costumes and appeared as a character.

=== Choreographer ===
Boitel first provided choreography for an opera in 2013, for Verdi's Macbeth at La Scala, for director Giorgio Barberio Corsetti. In 2015 she provided dance choreography for La belle Hélène at the Théâtre du Châtelet. In 2017, she carried out choreography for Alcyone at the newly refurbished Opéra-Comique, where she was noted for introducing circus elements to the 18th century opera.

=== Actress ===
Boitel continued to work as an actress, playing minor roles in films, an appearance on TV series Nicolas Le Floch in 2010, and four episodes of Candice Renoir in 2012–2014.
