= DeLanna Studi =

Cherokee actress (born 1976)

- Born: June 4, 1976 (age 50); Muldrow, Oklahoma, U.S.
- Education: University of Arkansas at Fort Smith; Northeastern State University
- Occupation: Cherokee actress

DeLanna Studi is a Cherokee actress who appears in DreamKeeper (2003), Edge of America (2003) and Shameless (2011).

== Early life and education ==
Studi was born on June 4, 1976 to mother, Deanna, and father, Thomas. Born into a small town of Muldrow, Oklahoma, she was very involved in her tribe, Cherokee. Being an active member in her tribe, she decided to follow in the footsteps of her uncle Wes Studi who became an actor to represent the Native American culture. Studi attended the University of Arkansas at Fort Smith and Northeastern State University in Tahlequah, Oklahoma, and studied architecture.

== Career ==
Studi moved to Los Angeles at the age of 22 to start her acting career. The first work that she ever appeared in was the Perfect music video by The Smashing Pumpkins (1998). After this video had surfaced on MTV, she was cast as Talks A Lot in a Hallmark movie, DreamKeeper (2003).

In 2015, Studi and her father retraced the 900 mile path, known as the Trail of Tears, that their family followed when forced to leave their homelands in the southeastern United States by the Indian Removal Act of 1830. This journey provided foundation for Studi's play And So We Walked.

== Honors ==
- 2003 - American Indian Movie Award - Best Supporting Actress for Talks A Lot in DreamKeeper
- 2004 - First Americans in the Arts - Outstanding Supporting Performance by an Actress in a TV Movie/Special (DreamKeeper)
- 2016 - Autry Museum of the American West - Butcher Scholar Award for And So We Walked
