= Gumboot dance =

African dance

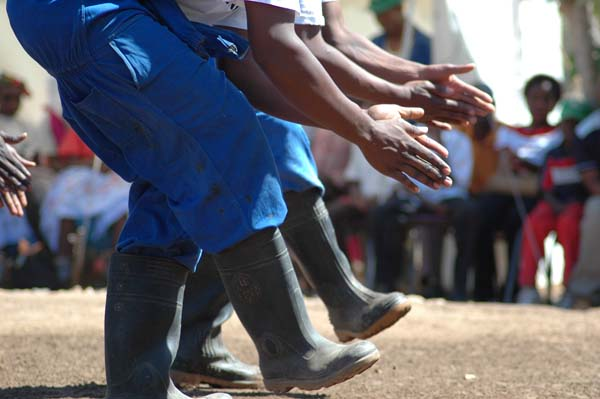
Gumboot dancers

The gumboot dance (or Isicathulo) is a South African dance that is performed by dancers wearing Wellington boots. In South Africa these are more commonly called gumboots.

The boots may be embellished with bells, so that they ring as the dancers stamp on the ground. This sound would be a code or a different calling to say something to another person a short distance away. This was used to communicate in the mines as there was strictly no talking otherwise there would be severe, drastic punishments at the discretion of their superior. The mines were very noisy workplaces, with pneumatic drills at work most of the time; in those days (until the mid 1970s) ear-defenders did not exist in South African mines.

== History ==
Rooted back in the dark gold mine tunnels of South Africa, gumboot dancing has come full circle. Initially a codified tap used by black miners deprived of conversation, gumboot dancing today is one of the most expressive South African dance genres.

== Description ==
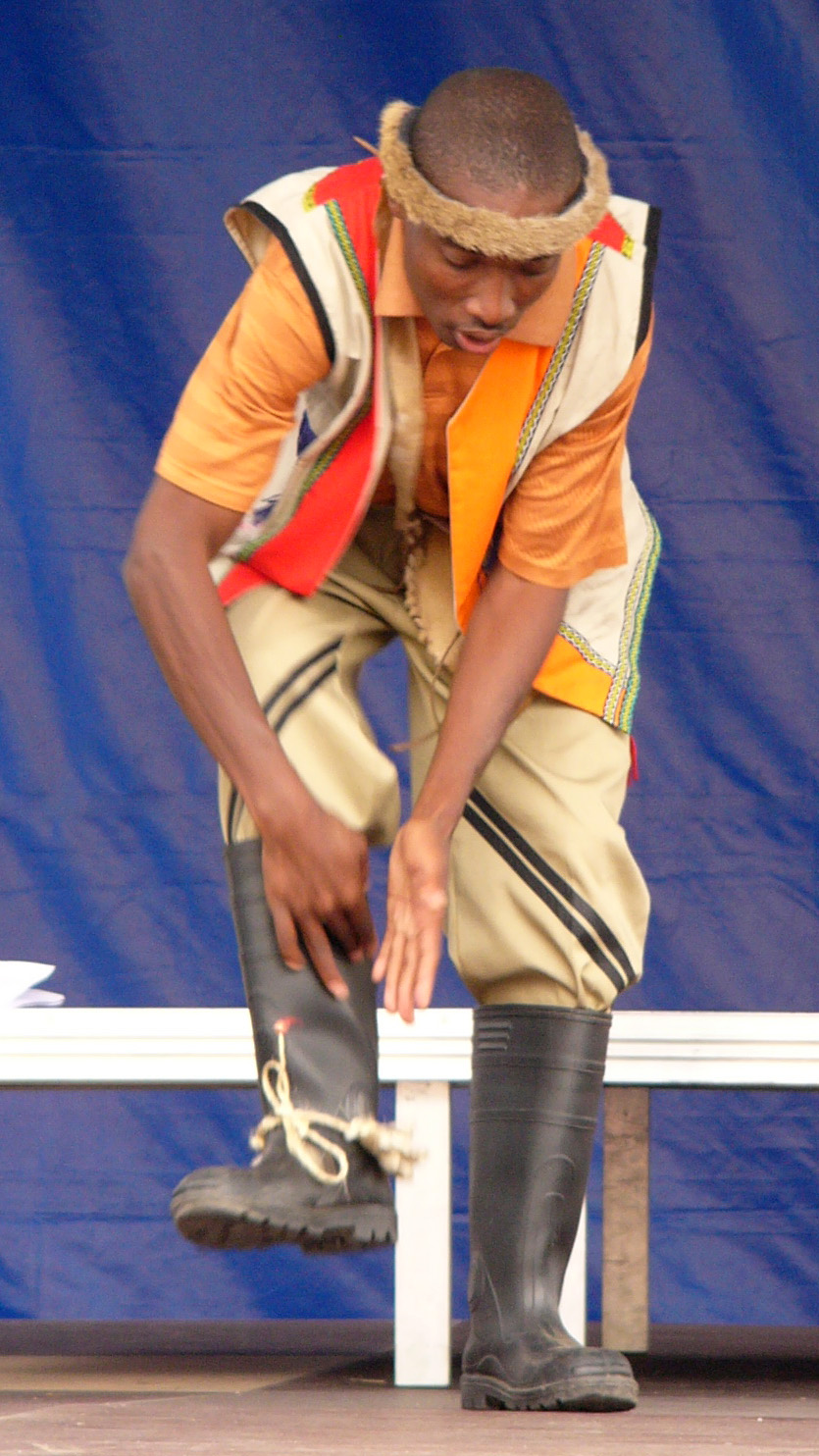
Gumboot dancer in Olomouc, Czech Republic at a show about Zulu culture

Gumboot dancers are commonly sighted on the streets and plazas of tourist areas in South Africa such as the Victoria & Alfred Waterfront in Cape Town. Many of the steps and routines are parodies of the officers and guards who controlled the mines and barracks of South African gold miners. Like other forms of African dance, Gumboot utilizes the concepts of polyrhythm and total body articulation, drawing from the cultural dances of the African workers that worked the mines. It is a percussive dance made by idiophones or autophones (objects of the everyday life vibrating by themselves), and is similar in execution and style to forms of "stepping" done by African-American fraternities and sororities.

== Appearances outside core context ==
The dance is the highlight of the performance of Black Umfolosi, a prominent South African folk group.

The album Graceland by the American pop singer Paul Simon has a song titled "Gumboots", which is performed in the style of South African township jive (mbaqanga) and contains performances by members of the Boyoyo Boys.

The British-American composer David Bruce has written a clarinet quintet entitled "Gumboots", which was inspired by Gumboot dancing. It was commissioned by Carnegie Hall in 2008 and can be heard in full on their website, performed by Todd Palmer and the St. Lawrence String Quartet.

Since a South-African student introduced gumboot to his classmates from all over the world at Pearson College UWC, the international school has kept this tradition through the Gumboot Core Team – a group that trains the steps, learns about the culture, and keeps the respect for it alive on campus for over 45 years now. The group respects the origins of the dance and tries to be as authentic and educative as possible when performing. At the beginning of every year, around the months of March and April, the team is responsible for choreographing and performing at the One World festival, an annual concert in Victoria, BC.

Since the 1990s and 2000s, Drakensberg Boys' Choir School based at gumboot dancing the folk-African part of their repertoire and white gumboots are the part of the second variant of their concert costume (the first variant is a classical "white man's" costume).

In 2017, World of Step was established by Creative Director, Chuck Maldonado and Founder of Art of Stepping, Jessica 'Remo' Saul in direct response of preserve the historical component of gumboot dance to be shared to the mass.
