= Sulayman Al-Bassam =

Kuwaiti playwright (born 1972)

Sulayman Al Bassam
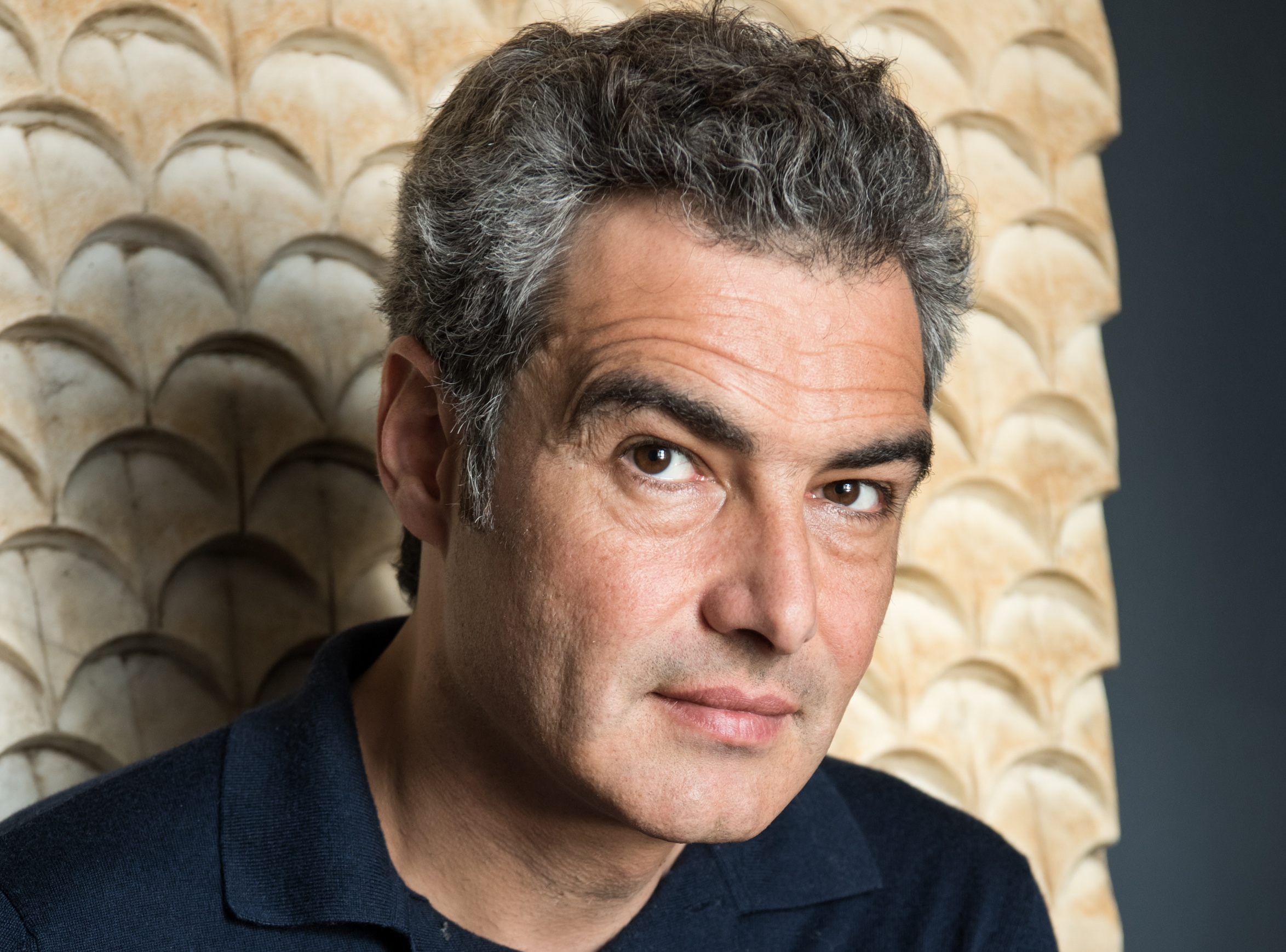
- Sulayman Al Bassam, London 2018
- Occupations: Playwright, Theatremaker
- Writing career
- Notable works: The Arab Shakespeare Trilogy; UR; Petrol Station; IMEDEA; Kalila wa Dimna, The Mirror For Princes; MUTE
- Website: www.sabab.org

Sulayman Al Bassam (born 1 June 1972), is a Kuwaiti playwright, theatre director and actor. His plays, written and published in English, are produced in Arabic, English, French, and German. His works have been performed at international venues, including the Brooklyn Academy of Music (USA), The Holland Festival (EU), Tokyo International Festival (Japan), and La Comédie-Française (France).

His 2007 production of Richard III: An Arab Tragedy premiered at the Royal Shakespeare Company and his 2013 production of Ritual for a Metamorphosis by Syrian playwright Saadallah Al Wannous for La Comédie-Française, entered the company's repertoire.

== Early life and education ==
Born in Kuwait, Al Bassam read English and Comparative Literature at Edinburgh, then Glasgow University, where he developed interests in theatre, performance and poetry.

== Work for the theatre ==
A defining element of Al-Bassam's work between 2002 and 2012 was his adaptive, free transpositions of classic texts—particularly Shakespeare—into the landscape of the contemporary world, often engaging with contemporary Gulf politics. These works were produced by his pan-Arab theatre troupe, SABAB Theatre, alongside British producer and dramaturge Georgina Van Welie. The trilogy of works that emerged—The Al-Hamlet Summit, Richard III: An Arab Tragedy, and The Speaker's Progress—published as The Arab Shakespeare Trilogy (Methuen Drama, Bloomsbury, 2014).

Since 2015, Al-Bassam's work has become more exploratory in content and form, with a focus on ancient texts and the apotheosis of female protagonists. In The Eruptive Mode (2017), written and directed by Al-Bassam, has a series of female monologues exploring the fractures and metamorphoses born out events related to the Arab Spring uprisings. Petrol Station (2017), written and directed by Al-Bassam, is set in a remote desert petrol station near a civil war zone. The play explores familial conflicts and themes of identity, ambition, and betrayal. UR (2018) was written and directed by Al-Bassam and co-produced by the State Theatre of Bavaria (Residenztheater, Munich) and the Arab Fund for Arts and Culture (AFAC). UR traverses multiple timelines, from 2000 BC to a dystopian future, examining themes of iconoclasm and civic space. IMEDEA (2021), written and directed by Al-Bassam, is a contemporary adaptation of the Greek myth. This play reimagines Medea as an Arab woman confronting authoritarianism. Mute(2023), written and directed by Al-Bassam, is set against the backdrop of the explosion of the port of Beirut in August 2020, Mute explores the limits of political critique through a hybrid form combining elements of a rock concert and a musical theatre monologue.

== Theatre companies ==
=== Zaoum Theatre Company (1996–2002) ===
In 1996, Al-Bassam founded the Zaoum Theatre Company in London, creating a series of text led, site-specific works including "Everyman, or Dreaming in Car Parks" (Edinburgh Festival 1996); "The Game Show" (Theatre Dijon Bourgogne, 1997); "The 60 Watt Macbeth", (Shunt Garage, London 1999); "The Al Hamlet Summit", (Edinburgh, Cairo, Kuwait, 2002.)

=== SABAB Theatre (2004–ongoing) ===
In 2004, Al Bassam established SABAB Theatre, an Arabic language production platform based out of Kuwait. SABAB is an independent touring theatre company working with actors, musicians and stage artists. SABAB productions are characterised by a radical approach to text, multiplicity of languages, bold visual styles and an engagement with issues concerning the contemporary Arab world, its people, cities, history and civilisational crossovers with the Mediterranean basin, Europe and the East.

== Other academic and media works ==
Between 2015-17, Al Bassam was a Global Fellow Artist in Residence at the Gallatin School of Individualized Study, New York University, USA.

Al-Bassam is also an editorial contributor to Kuwait's Al-Qabas newspaper and has published opinion articles in Die Zeit, and The Guardian.

== The Failaka Institute for Knowledge and Arts Research ==
In 2015, Al Bassam established an arts and knowledge research centre on the island of Failaka. The Failaka Institute for Knowledge and Arts Research (FIKAR) is a site of knowledge-production and creation dedicated to artists, writers, film, theatre and music practitioners and academic researchers whose work contributes to the celebration, protection and recognition of the ancient island of Failaka.

== Acting work ==
In addition to his theatre work, Al-Bassam has appeared as an actor in films and television, including Bridget Jones's Diary (2001) as Kafir Aghani and The Exchange Season 2 (2024) streamed on Netflix.

== Theatre productions ==
- 1996: Everyman, or dreaming in car parks An interactive theatre and video game performed in multi-storey carparks in London and Edinburgh. "The most risk-taking show on the fringe".
- 1997: The Game Show, commissioned by the National Theatre of Dijon, France. A fast-moving and darkly satirical Game Show performed in an industrial warehouse with 7 actors and 2 cars.
- 1999: The 60 Watt Macbeth, a series of hallucinatory variations on Shakespeare's Macbeth. Performed Shunt Garage, London.
- 2001: Hamlet in Kuwait, an adaptation of Shakespeare's Hamlet commissioned for performance in Kuwait on the 10th anniversary of Kuwait's liberation and as part of the activities of Kuwait Cultural Capital of the Arab World.
- 2001: The Arab League Hamlet Iteration 2.0, in response to 9/11.
- 2002: The Al Hamlet Summit, premiere Edinburgh Fringe Festival, winner of Scotsman Fringe First Award for innovation in writing and directing.
- 2003: Melting The Ice, Kuwait; Cairo. TAn Arab language theatrical response to the American-led invasion of Iraq. The piece brought together for the first time in over a decade Kuwaiti and Iraqi actors on one stage along with an international cast of British and American artists. The text was a collage combining scenes from Heiner Mueller's Slaughter and a piece from British dramatist Torben Betts. Performed in Kuwait and at the 15th Cairo Int'l Festival for Experimental Theatre.
- 2004: Trading, commissioned by Kuwait Ministry of youth. Gulf Youth Theatre Festival. Best Design Award, 3 Acting awards and Best Overall Production Award. Kuwait, 2004.
- 2004: Arabic world premiere of The Al Hamlet Summit, commissioned by The Tokyo International Arts Festival, opened the Festival in Tokyo in February, 2004.
- 2006: World premiere of Kalila wa Dimna; or The Mirror For Princes, written and directed by Al Bassam. Co-produced by Dar al Athar al Islamiyyah (Kuwait), The Tokyo Int'l Arts Festival (Japan), and bite06 (Barbican, London).
- 2007: Richard III; An Arab Tragedy commissioned by the Royal Shakespeare Company for the Complete Works Festival, Swan Theatre Stratford upon Avon.
- 2010: Hayyal Bu Tair, adaptation of Moliere's "Tartuffe", premiered at the Al Madina Theatre, Beirut. Directed by, and co-written by Al-Bassam with Jaafar Rajab).
- 2011/12: The Speaker's Progress, premiered at Brooklyn Academy of Music, New York. Idea by Georgina Van Welie; written and directed by Al-Bassam.
- 2013: Rituel pour Une Metamorphose, written by Saadallah Wannous, commissioned by La Comedie Francaise and Le Theatre du Gymnase, Marseille. Adapted and directed by Al-Bassam.
- 2013: In the Eruptive Mode (work in progress): Sciences Politiques Forum, Paris, Sydney International Festival, Australia. Written and directed by Al Bassam.
- 2015: In the Eruptive Mode: Tour: Tunis, Beirut, Cairo, Metz, Anvers, Boston. Written and directed by Al Bassam.
- 2015: UR (work in progress), Festival des Ecrivains du Monde, Reid Hall, Columbia University in Paris.
- 2017: Petrol Station, premiered at Kennedy Center, Washington DC, USA. Written and directed by Al Bassam.
- 2018: UR premiere at Rezidenstheater, Munich. Written and directed by Al Bassam.
- 2021: I M E D E A. Written, directed and acted in by Al Bassam.
- 2023: Mute. Written and directed by Al Bassam. (Co-conceived with Hala Omran, Eric Soyer, Abed Kobesisy, Ali Hout.)

== Awards ==
- 2002 Scotsman Fringe First Award (The Al Hamlet Summit)
- 2002 Cairo International Festival for Experimental Theatre Best Director Award; Best Production Award (The Al Hamlet Summit).
- 2008 National Arts Encouragement Award, Kuwait.
- 2021 Les Journées Théâtrales de Carthage: Best Text Award for (IMEDEA); Best Text
- 2023 Les Journées Théâtrales de Carthage: (2023): Golden Tanit Award for Best Production (Mute); Best Text Award (Mute).
- 2024 Cairo International Festival for Experimental Theatre (2024): Best Text Award for (MUTE).

== Publications ==
- The Al-Hamlet Summit. University of Hertfordshire Press, 2006. ISBN 978-1-902806-62-4.
- The Mirror for Princes: Kalila Wa Dimna. London: Oberon, 2006. ISBN 978-1-84002-670-2.
- The Arab Shakespeare Trilogy. Methuen Drama, Bloomsbury, 2014. ISBN 978-1-4725-2648-9.
- Petrol Station. Oberon Modern Plays, 2017. ISBN 978-1-78682-149-2.
- UR. Oberon Modern Plays, 2018. ISBN 978-1-78682-778-4.

== General references ==
- BBC Radio 3 – The Al-Hamlet Summit radio adaptation (genome.ch.bbc.co.uk)
- Immigrants & Minorities – "A Contemporary Adaptation of Shakespeare's Plays in Al-Bassam's The Arab Shakespeare Trilogy" (immi.se)
- Academia.edu – Professor Graham Holderness, "From Summit to Tragedy: Sulayman Al-Bassam's Richard III and Political Theatre" (academia.edu)
- Jordan Journal of Modern Languages and Literatures – Analysis of Petrol Station (jjmll.yu.edu.jo)
- UK Research Excellence Framework (REF) – Impact study on Al-Bassam's theatrical work (impact.ref.ac.uk)
- University of Hertfordshire Research – "Silence Bleeds: Hamlet Across Borders" (researchprofiles.herts.ac.uk)
- University of Jordan Research – Study on Arab adaptations of Shakespeare (research.ju.edu.jo)
- Érudit – Journal article on political themes in Al-Bassam's works (erudit.org)
- Nature Humanities & Social Sciences – Academic article on contemporary Arab theater (nature.com)
- Professor Margaret Litvin's Introduction to UR, (2018) (bloomsbury.com)
- Professor Susanne Wofford's Introduction to Petrol Station (2017) (bloomsbury.com)
