= Showtime Steppers =

- Also known as: Showtime, The Brotherhood, America's Favorite Step Team
- Origin: Fort Worth, Texas, United States
- Genres: Hip Hop, Instrumental, Dance, Gospel
- Years active: 1998–present
- Labels: Independent
- Members: El Hadjo (Founder); Mr. Showtime (President); Numba G Banks; P.B. D-Will; Deo; Promo; Eazy E Mars; Killa Cam
- Website: Official MySpace Page

The Showtime Steppers are a nationally recognized step team, and the first professional step team of its kind. The group, which originated from a Fort Worth, Texas high school, was professionally founded by Jenerian "El Hadjo" Young, and is currently being led by Shane "Mr. Showtime" Wilson. This group has become one of the most established professional step teams in America, and is widely known as "America's Favorite Step Team". The group has performed several times on national television, and has performed live for Kirk Franklin, President Barack Obama and his family, Ne-Yo, Pretty Ricky, Trey Songz, Nick Cannon, Lil' Fizz, Deitrick Haddon, Fonzworth Bentley, and Tonex.

== Biography ==
Sigma Beta Steppers (2001)

The Showtime Steppers originated in the late 1990s at Eastern Hills High School in Fort Worth. They were then known as the high school step team "Alpha and Omega" and later as the "Sigma Beta Steppers". After the first year, they were guided by Anthony Arnold, a member of Phi Beta Sigma fraternity and sponsored by Caprice Williams, a former teacher at the school. During the 2003–2004 school year, the group was undefeated, winning first place in over 20 step shows including that year's state championship step show.

Because the steppers were not under direct sponsorship of Phi Beta Sigma fraternity and were not registered under the national Sigma Beta Club guidelines, the team began to run into complications using the name "Sigma Beta". Therefore, prior to the start of the 2004–2005 school year, the team was reformed under the name "Showtime Steppers". The name is based on one of their original routines in which they called out, "It's showtime in the house tonight and it's our time to get it hype!"

In the fall of 2005, because of the graduation of all of the original group's members but one, a new team was formed by recruitment. This eventually led to a division of entities. The high school step team continued to perform under sponsorship at the high school and were occasionally supervised and assisted by the alumni (sometimes referred to as "The Brotherhood"). Meanwhile, the alumni also continued to perform on a national level.

== Stepping ==
"Stepping" or "step-dancing" is a form of percussive dance in which the participant's entire body is used as an instrument to produce complex rhythms and sounds through a mixture of footsteps, spoken word, and hand claps. Though stepping may be performed by an individual, it is generally performed by groups of three or more, often in arrangements that resemble military formations.

Stepping also draws from elements of gymnastics, tap dance, marching, and African and Caribbean dance, and can include semi-dangerous stunts as a part of individual routines. Some forms of stepping use props, such as blindfolds, canes, rhythm sticks, or fire.

Popularized by the National Pan-Hellenic Council member organizations who perform at local and national competitions, stepping has been featured in films such as School Daze (1988), Mac and Me (1988), Drumline (2002), Stomp the Yard (2007), and How She Move (2008). Stepping has also been featured on TV shows including A Different World, Sister, Sister, BET's 106 & Park, and NBC's America's Got Talent.

== Notable awards ==
- 2004 - 1st Place at State Championship (Texas)
- 2005 - 2nd Place at State Championship (Texas)
- 2008 - 1st Place on BET's 106 & Park: BET's Top 10 Live - (Wild Out Wednesday)

== Notable performances ==
- Three performances on BET's 106 & Park: BET's Top 10 Live
  - June 21, 2006 (Wild Out Wednesday)
  - January 30, 2008 (Wild Out Wednesday)
  - September 10, 2008 (W.O.W. All-Stars)
- Special Presentation to President Barack Obama and Family
- NBC's America's Got Talent (Season 3)
- BET's Spring Bling '07: Get 2 Steppin'
- BET's Spring Bling 2006: Get to Steppin'
- KTXA Dance Club 21 (formerly UPN's Dance 360)
- Tonex Concert
- Deitrick Haddon Concert
- World of Dance Tour (2010 & 2011)
