= Stepping (African-American) =

Percussive dance in African-American culture

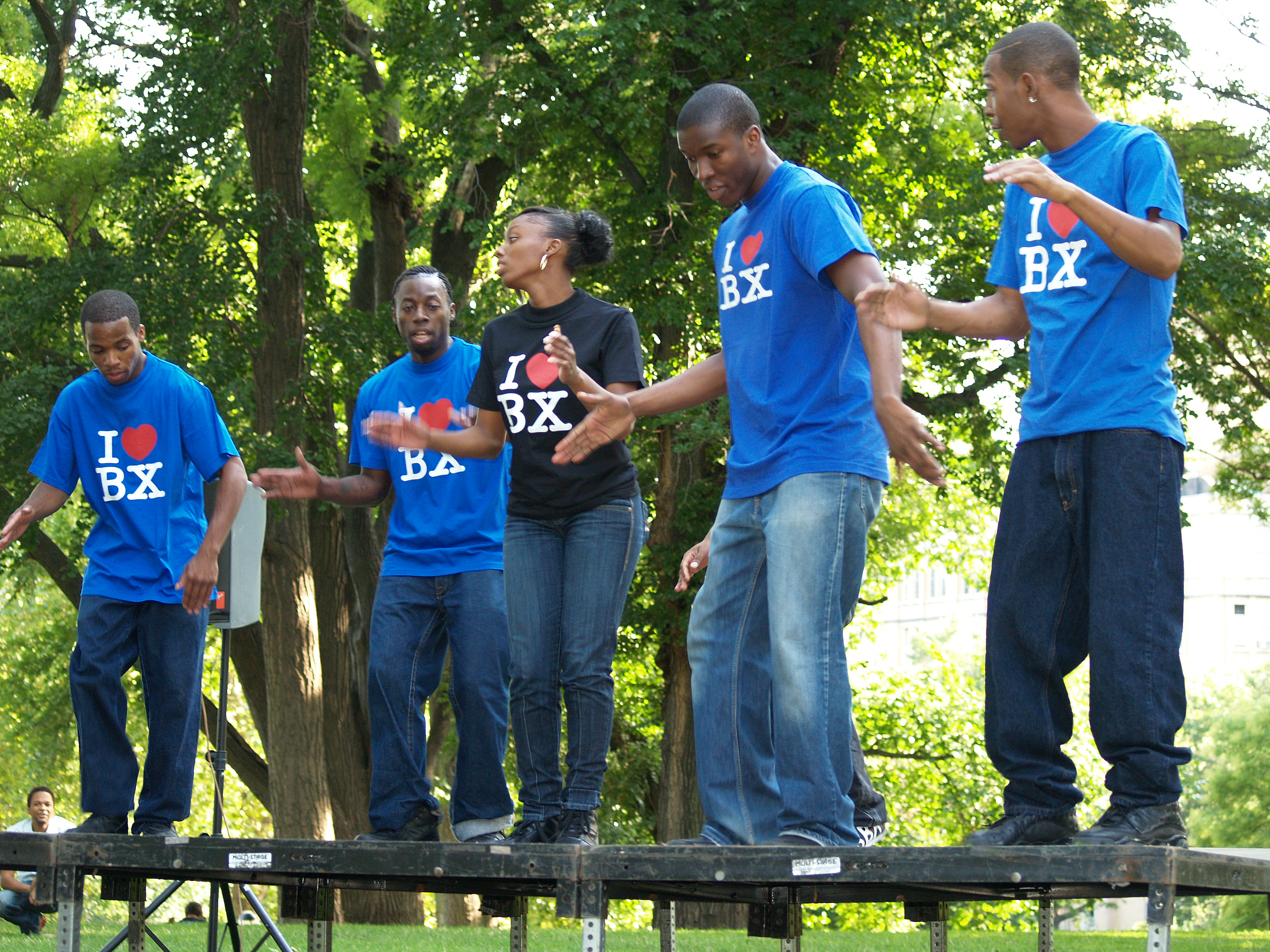
The Bronx's P.L.A.Y.E.R.S. Club Steppers, a step team that has performed at the White House.

Stepping or step-dancing (a type of step dance) is a form of percussive dance in African-American culture. The performer's entire body is used as an instrument to produce complex rhythms and sounds through a mixture of footsteps, spoken word, and hand claps. Though stepping may be performed by an individual, it is generally performed by groups of three or more, often in arrangements that resemble military formations.

Stepping may also draw from elements of gymnastics, break dance, tap dance, march, or African and Caribbean dance, or include stunts as a part of individual routines. The speed of the step depends upon the desired beat and rhythm of the performers. Some forms of stepping include the use of props, such as canes, rhythm sticks and/or fire and blindfolds.

The dance tradition of stepping draws from a variety of roots in American and African culture but was fostered and popularized by African American fraternities and sororities, beginning in the 1900s. These groups participate in stepping as a form of competition between one another, but also with cooperative spirit, such that groups from neighboring universities will visit and exchange moves and styles. The dance is also commonly performed by groups in elementary, middle, and high schools as well as churches.

== Origins ==
Stepping is a complex performance that melds folk traditions with popular culture as it involves synchronized percussive movement, singing, speaking, chanting, and drama. It finds its origins (among other places) in a combination of military close-order and exhibition drill. This is seen in the performances by some groups like Alpha Phi Alpha in their performance "Do it on Two" in which there is a call and response between a leader acting as a drill seargeant and the rest of the group as cadets; the whole routine is similar to a marching chant.

The dance form has also drawn heavily from pop culture in various forms over the past century from the stage routines and movements of popular R&B groups such as The Temptations and The Four Tops., to imitations of children's handclap games.

While initially taken up and popularized by Black Greek Letter organizations, it has spread beyond that group and is now commonly practiced by groups in schools, churches, cheerleading groups, and drill teams.

== History ==
Stepping originated in the 1700s. Enslaved people would often play drums as form of entertainment and in order to keep their African traditions alive. Enslaved people discovered that by playing beats and hitting the drum in a certain way, it would often mimic a sound similar to human speech. Black enslaved people used drumming as a way to communicate with each other. It was used to communicate in a way that white people could not understand and detect.

Stepping gained its distinctive percussive style after the 1739 Stono Rebellion in South Carolina. There, 20 enslaved people organized a rebellion near the banks of Stono River, banging on drums as they marched down the streets. The noise attracted a larger crowd of enslaved people who joined the revolution, and also of white colonists who killed most of the rebels. In the aftermath, lawmakers outlawed drumming as well as the right to own one, in order to eliminate it as a source of communication between enslaved persons. Following the ban, the percussive dance form (known today as stepping) began to emerge as enslaved people replaced the drums with their bodies.

In the early 1900s, the inception of black Greek organizations changed stepping into the style that many recognize today. NPHC fraternities and sororities had "Greek Sings," and this tradition gradually came to be used to celebrate initiations into the world of Greeks. The chapters would gather on campus and sing uplifting songs and cheers about their fraternity or sorority. In later years when the Greeks sung songs, they added movements such as walking in a circle and clapping hands. The sororities were singing songs up to the early eighties, and all of the sororities still have traditional songs that they sing today. Meanwhile, the fraternities began to add movement to their songs. In later years "Greek Sings" became "Greek Shows" which were a major event and still are to this day. The first official Greek Show was held at Howard University in 1976. Stepping has been popularized by National Pan-Hellenic Council member organizations who give tributes to their historical Greek letter organizations and also perform at local and national competitions. Stepping has become popular among the Greek organizations to show spirit and pride in their fraternity or sorority.

The most popular step routines have been passed down, and many of the songs are still used and housed in each fraternity's and sorority's history archives. Many times a step performance ends or incorporates the use of a chant that is associated with the respective organization. A chant is a song that is worded or has a rhythm specific to that organization. Each particular organization has their own.

Over time, more and more organizations have created moves to continue this growing passion; however, certain steps and moves originated and are considered signature to particular organizations. For example, "The Alpha Train" is a staple of Alpha Phi Alpha, "the Q Hop" is originally from Omega Psi Phi fraternity, "The Nut Cracker" is unique to Phi Beta Sigma fraternity, "The Dove" is unique to Zeta Phi Beta sorority, and "The Poodle Prance" is a signature move of Sigma Gamma Rho sorority.

In 2019, stepping advanced its movements with the creation of the World of Step, which is an international community focused on embracing the inclusivity of step as defined as using your body as an instrument to create sound. Once established, it opened its doors in connecting Haka, Zapateo Peruano, Taino Culture, Irish Step Dance and much more. Now it serves as the largest competition in the world with operations in United States, Senegal and Belgium along with participation of over 1 million votes.

With the push of step becoming inclusive in the dance world, the copyright office has an official language of step called: Remo System, created under the company Art of Stepping which teaches step through a written language. In addition, in 2019 the first step mobile app to help support the language of step was launched on Android.

== Contests ==
The first nationally syndicated stepping contest, S.T.O.M.P. was aired in 1992. It was created by Frank Mercardo Valdes, produced by the World African Network and Vic Bulluck, and choreographed by Vernon Jackson and Jimmy Hamilton from the Pi Kappa chapter of the Alpha Phi Alpha fraternity. They were also known as Step by Step Stomp. S.T.O.M.P. aired until 1996.

The World of Step International Competition serves as the largest competition for step. It features participants from the following countries: USA, Spain, Peru, Senegal, Korea, Kenya, Canada, and Belgium, with an expansion into Italy and Ireland. It was created by Jessica 'REMO' Saul, the founder of Art of Stepping and a member of the Omega Phi Beta sorority.

== Stepping influence in other cultures ==
Developed by African American fraternities and sororities, it is now practiced worldwide. For example, the tradition has been emulated by Latino fraternities and sororities such as Lambda Sigma Upsilon fraternity and Omega Phi Beta sorority which was led and created by Jessica 'REMO' Saul, Founder of Art of Stepping, World of Step and World of Step Media. This has led to an increase in participation of Latino Greek organizations in step show events, with groups often adding influences from salsa, merengue, bachata, as well as other traditionally Latino music. Latino Greeks are performing in more step shows, stroll competitions, and social functions on college campuses throughout the United States. Stepping has also been emulated by white, multicultural, and Asian fraternities and sororities, and has been represented in white media such as the "Step Up" movie series.

== See also ==
- Step dance
- Drill team
- Get down
- Gumboot dance
- Stomp the Yard
- Step (film)
- Showtime Steppers
- National Pan-Hellenic Council
- National Association of Latino Fraternal Organizations
- Dance in the United States
- Step Afrika!

== Bibliography ==
- Brown, Jamie. "Black Fraternities and Sororities and the History of Stepping." Yahoo! Contributor Network. Yahoo! Contributor Network, 10 Jan. 2008. Web. 3 May 2013
- Hughey, Matthew W. (2011). "Re-membering Black Greeks: Racial Memory and Identity in Stomp the Yard". Critical Sociology. 37 (1): 103–123. doi:10.1177/0896920510378771. S2CID 144912844.
- Malone, Jacqui. Steppin on the Blues. Chicago: University of Illinois Press, 1996.
- Ross, Lawrence Jr. The Divine Nine - The History of African American Fraternities and Sororities. Kensington Publishing Corporation, 2001.
