= Manual Cinema =

American performance collective

Manual Cinema is a performance collective, design studio, and film/video production company founded in Chicago, Illinois, in 2010, by Drew Dir, Sarah Fornace, Ben Kauffman, Julia Miller, and Kyle Vegter. Manual Cinema combines handmade shadow puppetry, vintage overhead projectors, live feed cameras, cinematic techniques, sound effects and live music to create film and theatre works.

Manual Cinema contributed two films, Ten Letters a Day and Power of Place, to the Barack Obama Presidential Center, which opened to the public on June 19, 2026.

== Leadership ==
Co-Artistic Directors and Staff:

- Drew Dir, Co-Artistic Director, writer, director, puppet designer
- Sarah Fornace, Co-Artistic Director, director, puppeteer, choreographer, narrative designer
- Ben Kauffman, Co-Artistic Director, composer, director, interactive media artist
- Julia Miller, Co-Artistic Director, director, puppeteer, designer
- Kyle Vegter, Co-Artistic Director, composer, producer, sound designer

== Recognition ==
The company was awarded an Emmy in 2017 for The Forger, a video created for The New York Times and named Chicago Artists of the Year in 2018 by the Chicago Tribune. In 2020 they were included in 50 of Chicago theater "Rising Stars and Storefront Stalwarts" (Newcity).

Their shadow puppet animations were featured in the 2021 film remake of Candyman, directed by Nia DaCosta and produced by Jordan Peele’s Monkeypaw Productions. In September 2014, the group traveled to Tehran, Iran to present their piece, Ada/Ava at a puppet festival.

In 2022 they premiered Leonardo! A Wonderful Show About A Terrible Monster, an adaptation of two books by celebrated children's author Mo Willems and a live adaptation of their 2020 streaming hit A Christmas Carol.

== Works by genre ==
=== Theater ===
- The 4th Witch (2025)
- Leonardo! A Wonderful Show About A Terrible Monster (2023)
- Manual Cinema's Christmas Carol (2022)
- The Magic City (2017)
- No Blue Memories (2017)
- Frankenstein
- Ada/Ava (2013)
- Moholy-Nagy: The Electric Stage (2016)
- Monday or Tuesday (2016)
- Mementos Mori (2015)
- Hänsel Und Gretel (2015)
- Head in the Cloud (2015)
- Lula Del Ray (2012)
- The End of TV (2017)
- Mariko's Magical Mix (with Hubbard Street2)
- Peter Pan Beijing
- Mr. and Mrs. Pennyworth (for Lookingglass Theatre Company)

=== Film ===
- Power of Place (2026)
- Ten Letters a Day(2026)
- Future Feeling (2023)
- Poetry Out Loud (2022)
- Candyman (2021)
- Leonardo and Sam* The Film! (2021)
- Scout's Honor (2020)
- Multitudes (2019)
- Obits (2019)
- City on Fire: Chicago 1871
- All of them Witches
- We Real Cool (2017)
- Oedipus Rex
- Poem
- Three WWI Poems
- Floridaman
- Invisibilia
- Chicagoland (2015)
- Gabriel Kahane - Bradbury (304 Broadway)
- Move Many (Joints) (for jazz musician Esperanza Spalding)
- 8BB - Meanwhile
- La Celestina

=== Music ===
- The Forger (2016)
- My Soul's Shadow
- Just a Dog (2016)
- No Blue Memories
- Poetry Out Loud (2022)
- Leonardo! A Wonderful Show About A Terrible Monster
- Future Feeling (2023)
- Leonardo and Sam* The Film!
- Multitudes
- Scout's Honor
- The End of TV
- The Magic City
- Invisibilia
- Lula Del Ray
- Ada/Ava
- Poem
- Obits
- Three WWI Poems
